= 13th Massachusetts Battery =

- Active: November 3, 1862 – July 28, 1865
- Country: United States
- Branch: Union Army
- Type: Field artillery
- Size: Battery
- Part of: In 1864: Artillery, 1st Division, XIX Corps
- Engagements: American Civil War

Commanders
- Current commander: Captain Charles H. J. Hamlin

The 13th Massachusetts Battery (or 13th Battery Massachusetts Light Artillery) was an artillery battery that served in the Union Army during the American Civil War. The unit was organized at Camp Meigs near Boston during the fall of 1862. Its members were mustered in at various times over the fall and the officers mustered into federal service on November 3, 1862. It was assigned to the Department of the Gulf commanded by Major General Nathaniel P. Banks and departed Massachusetts by steamship on January 20, 1863.

The journey was delayed by storms and the loss of 60 horses due to rough treatment from the heavy seas. The unit disembarked at Fortress Monroe, remained in the vicinity for six weeks, then resumed their voyage which was further delayed by calms. The battery reached New Orleans on May 10 and remained quartered there until the beginning of June. On June 5, 1863 the unit turned their horses over to the 12th Massachusetts Battery and departed New Orleans to take part in the Siege of Port Hudson. They were assigned to operate four siege mortars, a type of heavy artillery not typically used by units of light artillery. The kept up continual fire of these guns for 31 days, along with other artillery units, until the city surrendered on July 9.

On August 31, 1863, the 13th Massachusetts Battery returned to New Orleans. Due to losses from disease and desertions, the battery numbered just 50 men fit for active duty after the Siege of Port Hudson—about one-third of its original strength. Due to their low numbers, the battery was merged for a time with the 2nd Massachusetts Battery, becoming an auxiliary of that unit. With the 2nd Massachusetts Battery, they participated in the Second Bayou Teche Campaign intended to clear western Louisiana of Confederate forces and gain a foothold in Texas in the fall of 1863. They took part in numerous skirmishes and advancing as far as Opelousas, Louisiana and then joined in the retrograde movement, falling back to New Iberia, Louisiana. After the close of the campaign, the 13th Massachusetts went into winter quarters in Franklin, Louisiana.

On February 18, 1864, the men of the 13th Massachusetts Battery were transferred to the 6th Massachusetts Battery and again transferred a few weeks later to Battery L, 1st United States Light Artillery. As an auxiliary to this unit, they participated in the Red River Campaign, a failed attempt to advance Union forces up the Red River and into Texas. The members of the battery were involved in several engagements during this campaign and suffered casualties during the Battle of Pleasant Hill. At the close of the campaign, the battery returned to New Orleans on June 29, 1864. Two days later, on July 1, they were re-supplied with four field guns and restored as an independent unit. That month they were posted at Camp Parapet just outside of New Orleans where they remained until after the end of the war.

The 13th Massachusetts Battery returned to Massachusetts in July 1865 and was mustered out on July 28. The regiment did not have any men killed in combat but lost 26 dead due to disease.

== See also ==
- Massachusetts in the Civil War
- List of Massachusetts Civil War units
