= 58th Massachusetts Infantry Regiment =

58th Regiment Massachusetts Volunteer Infantry
- Flag of Massachusetts
- Active: April 25, 1864 - July 18, 1865
- Allegiance: Union
- Branch: Union Army
- Type: Infantry
- Size: 1,032
- Part of: In 1864: 1st Brigade, 2nd Division, IX Corps

Commanders
- 1st: Col. Silas P. Richmond
- 2nd: Lt. Col. John C. Whiton

Insignia
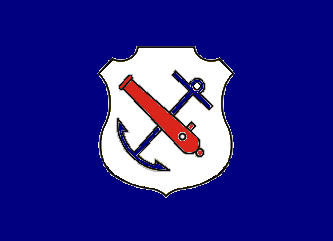
- IX Corps (2nd Division) badge

The 58th Regiment Massachusetts Volunteer Infantry was an infantry regiment that served in the Union Army during the American Civil War. It was one of the four Massachusetts "Veteran Regiments" raised in the winter of 1863–64. Recruits of these regiments were required to have served at least nine months in a prior unit. The regiment was attached to the IX Corps of the Army of the Potomac and took part in Lieutenant General Ulysses S. Grant's Overland Campaign in the spring of 1864. They were in heavy combat during the campaign, suffering casualties during engagements which included the Battle of the Wilderness, Spotsylvania Courthouse, and the Battle of the Crater. They were also involved in several assaults during the Siege of Petersburg.

== Service ==
Organized at Reedville April 25, 1864. Moved to Alexandria, Va., April 28–30. Attached to 1st Brigade, 2nd Division, 9th Army Corps, Army of the Potomac, to July, 1865.

== Detailed History ==
The 58th Regiment Mass. Vol. Inf. the Third Veteran Regiment, was organized at Readville, Mass., the first eight companies being mustered into the service between Jan. 14 and April 18, 1864. The conditions of enlistment were the same as those in the other veteran regiments. The regiment, consisting at this time of only eight companies, the organization of Companies "I" and "K" not having yet been completed, left the State April 28, 1864, under the command of Lieut. Col. John C. Whiton, formerly lieutenant colonel of the 43rd Regiment Mass. Volunteer Militia, and reached Alexandria, Va., Saturday, April 30. Here it took train May 2 for Bristoe Station, arriving that evening. At Bristoe it was assigned to Bliss' (1st) Brigade, Potter's (2nd) Division, Burnside's (9th) Corps, the 36th Massachusetts being in the same brigade. On May 4 the forward movement of the Army of the Potomac and of the 9th Corps began. That night the 58th reached a position near the Rappahannock River and there bivouacked. The following day it crossed this river and marched to and crossed the Rapidan at Germanna Ford, the sounds of the battle which began that day continually increasing as they advanced. On the forenoon of May 6 the 2nd and 3rd Divisions of the 9th Corps went into action in the woods south of the Wilderness Tavern, attempting to close the gap between the right of the 2nd and the left of the 5th Corps. In the afternoon, on the banks of a swampy ravine, the 58th was heavily engaged, losing seven killed, 23 wounded, and four missing. Following the flank movement to Spotsylvania, on the 12th of May the regiment joined in an assault on Hill's Corps, meeting stubborn resistance, and losing 13 killed, 90 wounded, and two missing. Among the killed were Captain Harley and Adjutant Ogden. In further skirmishing near Spotsylvania the regiment lost three killed and six wounded. At the North Anna River, May 24, the 58th was not heavily engaged, and in the fighting near the Totopotomoy about the last of the month but slight loss was suffered by the regiment. On the morning of June 3, 1864, the 9th Corps being on the right, near Bethesda Church, the 58th joined in the general assault, losing 18 killed and 67 wounded. Among the dead were Maj. Barnabas Ewer, Capt. Charles M. Upham, and Capt. Thomas McFarland. From this time until the 12th the regiment lost two killed, 12 wounded, and 16 missing. While the Cold Harbor operations were in progress, the regiment was joined by its ninth company, " I ", the muster in of which was not completed until May 13. Crossing the James River, June 15, on the 17th the 58th joined in the assault on the lines east of Petersburg, losing two killed, 22 wounded, and one missing. Between this time and July 30 it was engaged in trench duty, losing five killed and nine wounded. On July 30 came the Battle of the "Crater" near Petersburg. The tunnel under the salient had been made by soldiers of the 48th Pennsylvania which was in the same brigade with the 58th Massachusetts. The 58th was one of the regiments which charged into the "Crater" and beyond it, but was later driven back, losing Lieutenant Granet and four men killed, 30 wounded, and 84 prisoners. After this fight it remained in the trenches until the latter part of September. At Poplar Grove Church, south of Petersburg, the regiment was engaged Sept. 30, losing a large number of prisoners, the entire loss being two killed, 10 wounded, and 99 captured. Only about a dozen members of the command escaped. The winter of 1864-65 was spent by the 58th in Fort Meikle, and was without notable event. Its members were augmented by the return of convalescents, the arrival of recruits, and finally, on Feb. 20, 1865, by the arrival of Co. "K", the organization and muster of which had not been completed until Jan. 26, 1865. The 58th joined in the general assault on Petersburg, April 2, 1865, making a lodgment in the Confederate works just west of Fort Mahone, and losing five killed, 17 wounded, and 14 prisoners. After the fall of Petersburg, April 3, the regiment proceeded along the Southside Railroad as far as Burkeville Junction, being at this place at the time of the surrender of Lee. From here it moved to Farmville, where it remained ten days guarding the railroad. On April 20 it began its return march to City Point, arriving on the 24th. Embarking on the 26th, it reached Washington two days later. Here it was occupied in guard and camp duty until July 15, participating meanwhile in the Grand Review of the Army of the Potomac, May 23. The regiment was mustered out July 14, and on the following day took transportation for home. Arriving at Readville, July 18, on the 26th its members were paid off and discharged.

== Casualties ==
The regiment lost 139 men killed in action and mortally wounded as well as 156 who died of disease for a total of 295 men who died during service.

== See also ==
- List of Massachusetts Civil War units
- Massachusetts in the Civil War
