= 56th Massachusetts Infantry Regiment =

56th Regiment Massachusetts Volunteer Infantry
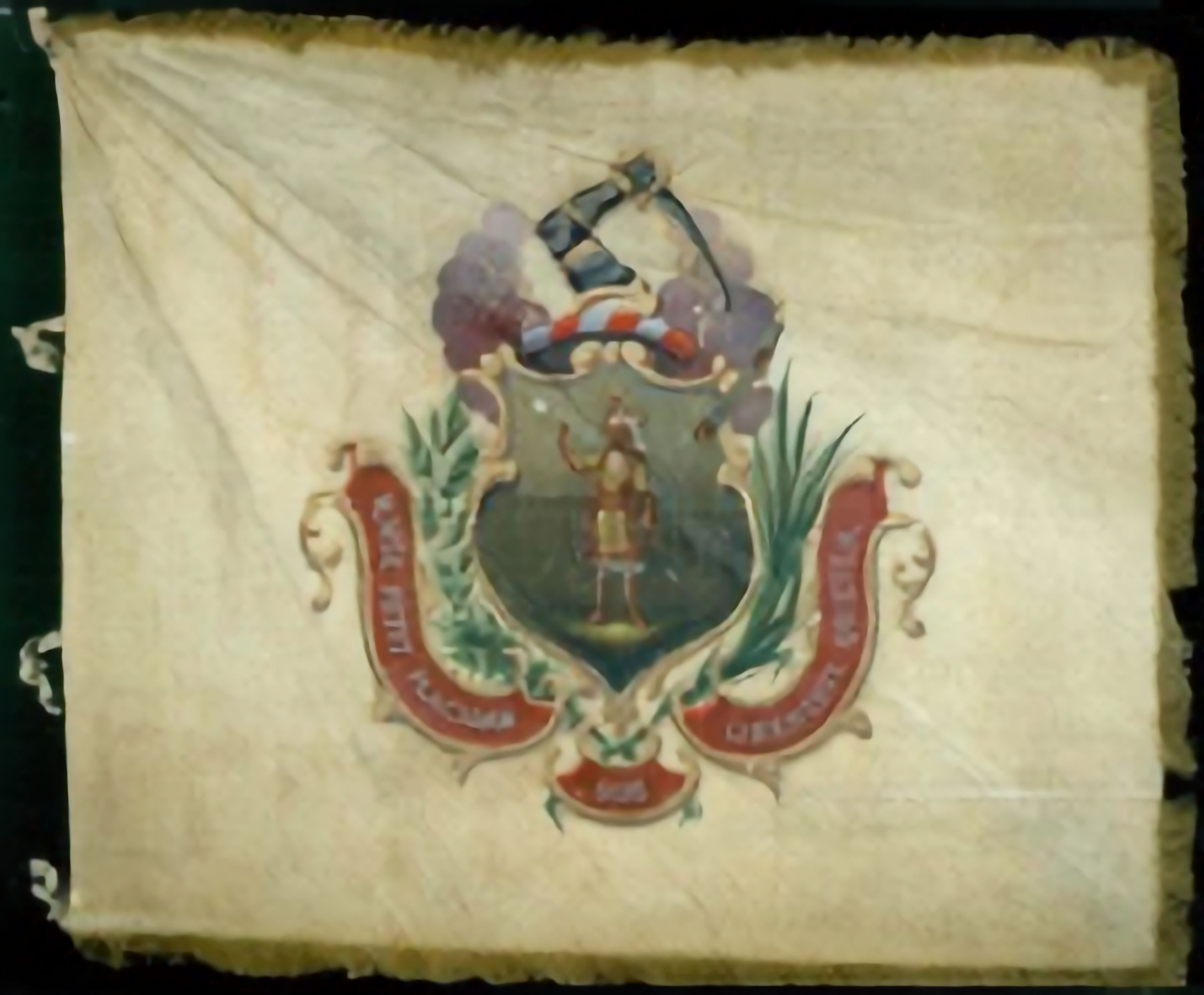
- Regimental colors of 56th Massachusetts Volunteers
- Active: February 25, 1864 – July 22, 1865
- Country: United States
- Branch: Union Army
- Type: Infantry
- Size: 1,047
- Part of: In 1864: 1st Brigade, 1st Division, IX Corps

Commanders
- Colonel: Charles E. Griswold
- Colonel: Stephen Minot Weld, Jr.

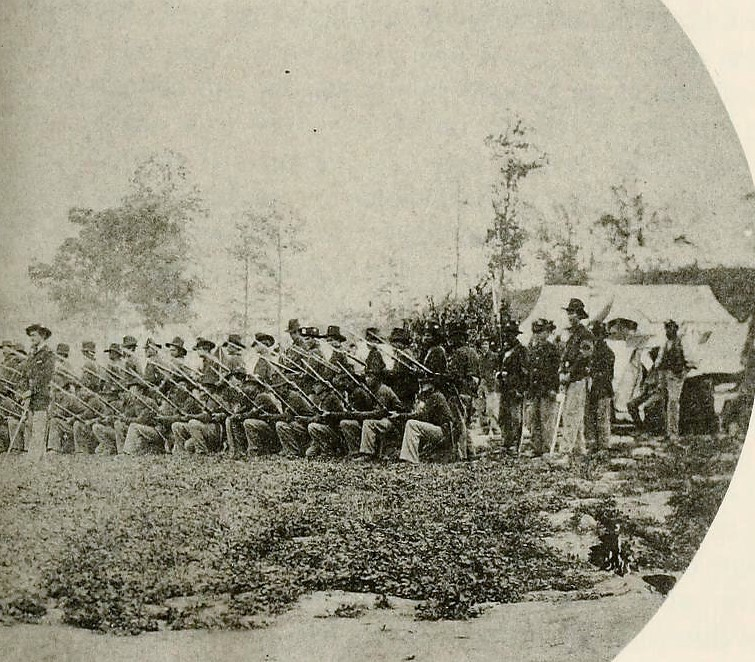
A portion of the 56th Massachusetts drilling in camp during the Siege of Petersburg

The 56th Regiment Massachusetts Volunteer Infantry was a regiment of infantry that served in the Union Army during the American Civil War. It was one of the four "Veteran Regiments" raised in the winter of 1863–64. Recruits of these regiments were required to have served at least nine months in a prior unit. The regiment was attached to the IX Corps of the Army of the Potomac and took part in Lieutenant General Ulysses S. Grant's Overland Campaign in the spring of 1864. They were in extremely heavy combat during the campaign, suffering great casualties during engagements which included the Battle of the Wilderness, Spotsylvania Courthouse, and the Battle of the Crater. They were involved in several assaults during the Siege of Petersburg in 1864 and participated in the spring 1865 battles which finally drove General Robert E. Lee's Confederate Army from their entrenchments in Petersburg, leading to the end of the war at Appomattox Courthouse.

== Formation and early duty ==
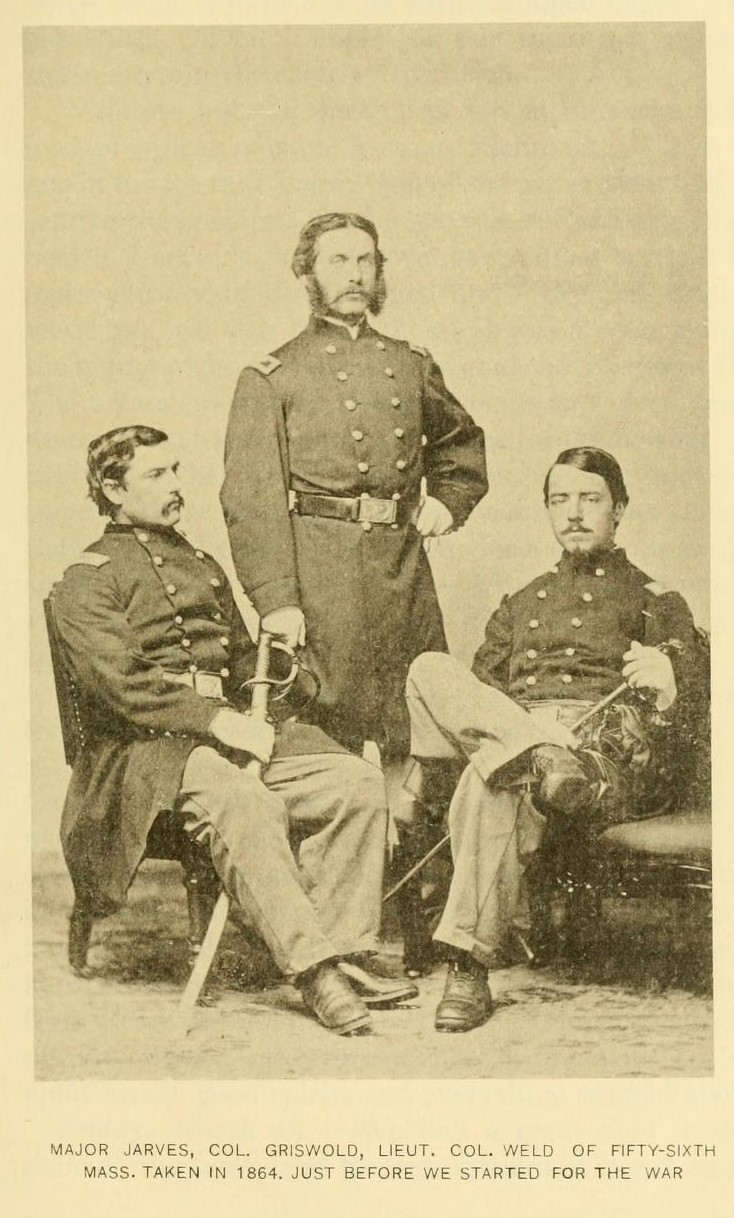
Left to right: Maj. Horatio Jarves, Col. Charles Griswold, Lt. Col. Stephen Minot Weld, Jr.

The first four companies of the regiment went into training at Camp Meigs in Readville, Massachusetts just outside of Boston in late December 1863. The last of the required ten companies arrived and was mustered into service on February 25, 1864. Charles E. Griswold was appointed colonel and commanding officer of the regiment. A merchant from Boston, Massachusetts, he had previously served as colonel of the 22nd Massachusetts. The second-in-command was Stephen Minot Weld, Jr., son of a wealthy Boston businessman and politician. He was 21 years-old and had served as a captain with the 18th Massachusetts in battles include Antietam and Gettysburg. The regiment departed Massachusetts on March 20 for Annapolis, Maryland where Major General Ambrose Burnside was reorganizing his IX Corps for the spring campaign.

The 56th Massachusetts became part of the 1st Brigade (commanded by Col. Sumner Carruth) of the 1st Division (commanded by Brigadier General Thomas G. Stevenson) of Burnside's IX Corps. The Corps remained at Annapolis until April 23 when they were ordered to march for Washington, D.C. From there they passed on to Alexandria and eventually joined the Army of Potomac in its winter quarters surrounding Bealton Station, Virginia along the Orange and Alexandria Railroad. The regiment bivouacked there for three days before the Army of the Potomac crossed the Rapidan River and the Overland Campaign commenced.

== Overland Campaign ==
=== Battle of the Wilderness ===
The night of May 5, 1864 Carruth's brigade, including the 56th Massachusetts, camped near the Wilderness Tavern. In the early morning of May 6 they were ordered forward with their brigade towards the sound of constant musket fire. With the Battle of the Wilderness already underway, their brigade pressed forward to the right of the Orange Plank Road through the terrain of heavy thickets, brush, and scrub trees which gave the battle its name. Their brigade was detached from the IX Corps to support the right flank of Gen. Winfield S. Hancock's II Corps which was crumbling under a heavy onslaught the Confederates of Gen. James Longstreet's Corps. The 56th Massachusetts was attacked on their left flank and within minutes of the start of their engagement, Col. Charles Griswold was shot in the neck and killed. Lt. Col. Stephen M. Weld assumed command of the regiment and would remain in command until the end of their service. With men of the II Corps retreating through their ranks, and amidst much confusion, Lt. Col. Weld asked Gen. Alexander S. Webb of the II Corps if they should retreat. Webb responded, "Get out of there as damned quick as you can!" The regiment retreated in order, stopping periodically to fire, until they reached the rifle pits along the Brock Road. The regiment suffered casualties of nine killed, 57 wounded, and 11 missing in a short period of fighting.

=== Battle of Spotsylvania Court House ===
As Grant ordered a movement by the left flank in an effort to outflank Lee's army, the IX Corps (including the 56th Massachusetts) marched the widest arc, first moving east towards Fredericksburg, Virginia and then southward on May 8 and 9 towards the crossroads known as Spotsylvania Court House. While they executed this wide march, other elements of the Army of the Potomac engaged the Confederates and both forces began to dig in. The 56th Massachusetts was not engaged until the IX Corps advanced along the Fredericksburg Pike on May 12 and assaulted the Confederate left flank. The 56th Massachusetts was initially held in reserve during this assault but later in the day made an effort to carry the enemy's breastworks by direct charge. They were repulsed, suffering casualties of ten killed, 41 wounded and one missing. Due to casualties among senior officers, the colonel of the 56th Massachusetts, Stephen Weld, was temporarily advanced to brigade command and performed ably during the assault on May 12. He was replaced on May 14 with Brig. Gen. James Ledlie, a political appointee with little battlefield experience. After several days of digging rifle pits, making breastworks and exchanging light fire with enemy skirmishers, the 56th Massachusetts took part in another assault on the Confederate works surrounding Spotsylvania Court House on May 18. The regiment advanced through woods to about 100 yards distance of the Confederate abatis in front of their works and made a charge. They reached the abatis, however, being under a heavy crossfire from both infantry and artillery, the regiment had to retreat. During this assault, the 56th Massachusetts lost an additional five killed and 40 wounded.

=== Battle of North Anna ===
The 56th Massachusetts marched for three days with their brigade after Grant decided to disengage at Spotsylvania Court House and again attempted to move around Lee's flank. On May 24, they were heavily engaged in the Battle of North Anna during a phase of the battle which took place at Ox Ford. Their brigade under the command of Gen. Ledlie made a flanking march upriver and crossed at Quarles Mill. When their brigade reached open fields on the south side of the North Anna River, they deployed in lines of battle. They advanced in battle line for about three quarters of a mile until they encountered the Confederates. They believed they had encountered a small rear guard of the retreating Confederate army however the whole of Grant's army had in fact been lured into a trap as Lee had set up a strong defensive position south of the North Anna River. Ledlie's brigade, including the 56th Massachusetts, advanced on the strongest portion of Lee's line. The 56th Massachusetts charged to about 100 yards of the Confederate works and stopped due to the intensity of fire. Lying prone, the regiment remained in this position for between two and three hours, under constant fire from sharpshooters. When a thunderstorm erupted, Ledlie's brigade made a retreat under heavy artillery fire. Lt. Col. Weld commanding the 56th Massachusetts later wrote that Ledlie had "botched" the entire advance and was apparently drunk. The 56th Massachusetts suffered 7 killed, 40 wounded and lost 17 as prisoners.

=== Battle of Bethesda Church ===
As Grant again disengaged and made another wide flanking move around the Confederate left flank, the 56th Massachusetts went back across the North Anna River by a pontoon bridge. On May 27 they marched 11 miles. On May 28 they marched 15 miles and then through the night until May 29, making another 13 miles. In the morning of May 30 they were in reserve as the Battle of Bethesda Church took place. They were moved closer to the front along the Shady Grove Road on the left flank of the IX Corps. They occupied rifle pits and were not heavily engaged that day. The following day, the regiment was ordered forward as skirmishers to probe the enemy and found the Confederates entrenched in force. The 56th Massachusetts engaged them in skirmish order for about an hour and then were relieved. They suffered casualties of one killed, 11 wounded and one missing.

=== Battle of Cold Harbor ===
Again Grant moved his army around Lee's right and engaged the Confederates in the Battle of Cold Harbor. As the army moved, the 56th Massachusetts along with the rest of the IX Corps acted as rear guard. On June 2 the Confederates attacked their position. The 56th Massachusetts was one of the regiments assigned to support the 2nd Maine Battery and were forced to lie prone in front of the guns. The artillery checked the Confederate advance but the 56th Massachusetts took friendly fire in the form of shrapnel from the guns. During fighting on June 2, the regiment lost two killed and seven wounded. On June 3, the regiment was held in reserve near the right flank of the Union position and did not take part in the infamous frontal assaults made by the rest of the Union forces during which they took such heavy casualties.

== Siege of Petersburg ==
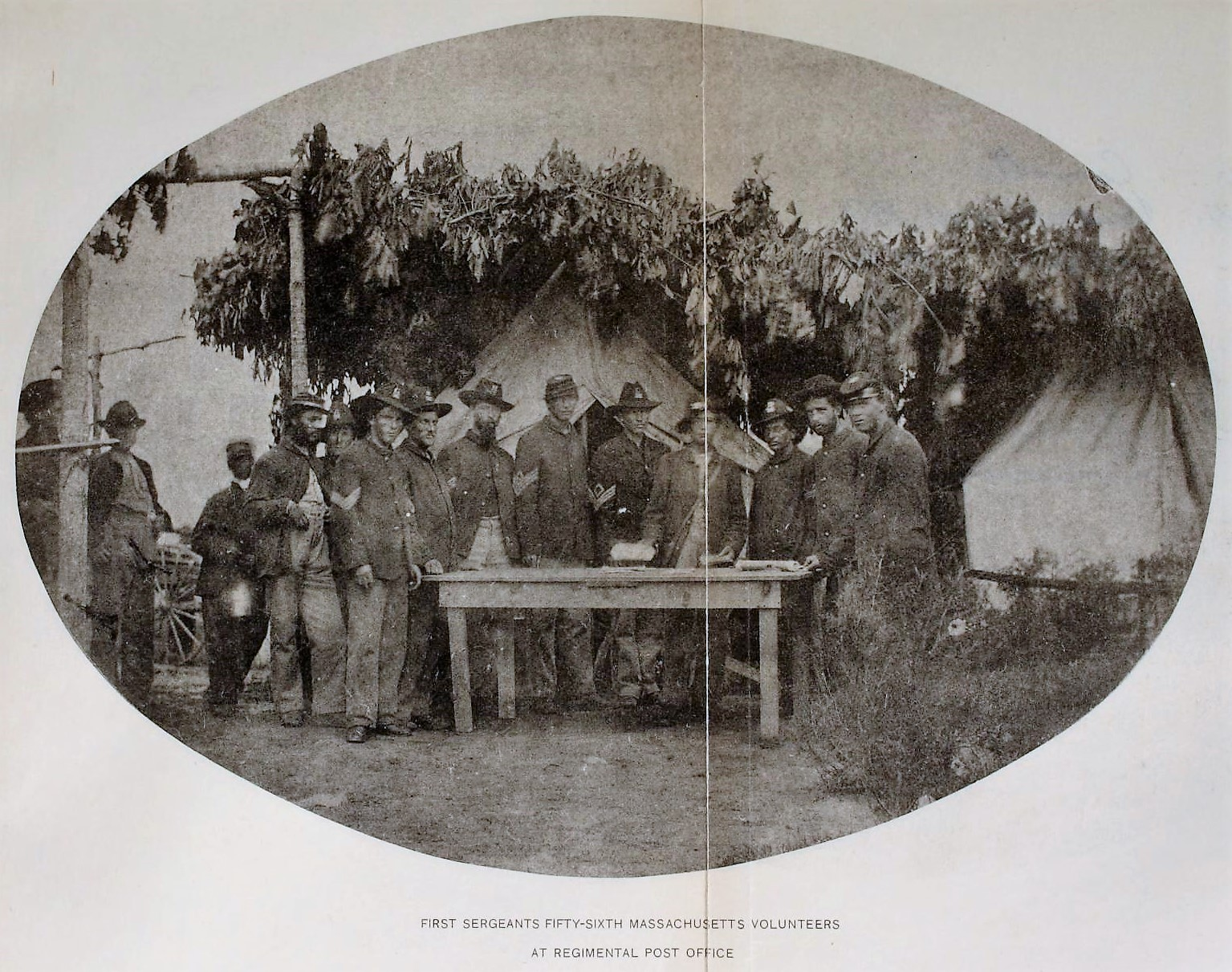
First sergeants of the 56th Massachusetts gathered around the regimental post office during the Siege of Petersburg

After more than a month of very hard fighting and severe casualties, the 56th Massachusetts was reduced to a small number of men. Prior to the June 17 assault, the regiment numbered only 130 men in contrast to the roughly 1,000 that had left Boston in March. The regiment would lose still more men in heavy engagements during the Siege of Petersburg.

=== Assault of June 17 ===
In the days leading up to the June 17 assault on the Confederate entrenchments around Petersburg, Virginia, the 56th Massachusetts endured long marches as Generals Grant and Meade arrayed their troops for an offensive. The regiment crossed the James River on June 15. On June 17 as a general assault got underway, the 56th Massachusetts was in the front line of their brigade during a charge across 200 yards of ground. Under heavy infantry and artillery fire, they managed to take the Confederate entrenchments in their front. A Confederate counter-attack soon drove them back to their original position. The Union assaults up and down the lines were similarly repulsed. During this attack, they captured 50 Confederates but lost 19 killed, 40 wounded and five missing.

=== Battle of the Crater ===
In late June and early July, the 56th Massachusetts occupied the trenches outside Petersburg with the rest of the Union army. During this time, the 48th Pennsylvania Infantry dug a mine underneath the Confederate entrenchments and packed it with enough gunpowder to blast a tremendous hole in Confederate defenses. A division of African-American troops prepared a plan of attack and trained to lead the main assault after mine was exploded. However, the day before the attack, Gen. Meade changed the plan, instead assigning Gen. Ledlie's division (including the 56th Massachusetts) to lead the assault. Ledlie's officers had no specific knowledge of the intended assault and the units had not prepared a plan of attack. On July 30, the mine was blown up. The 56th Massachusetts made the advance charge with other regiments. With no particular plan, the entire division ended up crowding into the crater which was roughly thirty feet deep. Col. Weld of the 56th Massachusetts later recalled that it was "perfect pandemonium" and that men were pressed together so thickly that they could not raise their arms, let alone shoot. Weld was taken prisoner—the only one of nine regimental commanders in Ledlie's division to survive the crater. The 56th Massachusetts lost ten killed, 25 wounded and 22 prisoners.

=== Remainder of the siege ===
In August 1864, a large expedition force commanded by Maj. Gen. Gouverneur K. Warren severed the Weldon Railroad, the main supply line for the Confederate army, during the Second Battle of the Weldon Railroad. The 56th Massachusetts had one man killed and nine wounded during this engagement. The regiment remained encamped near the railroad until the end of September. During this time, their division was discontinued due to its severe depletion. The remaining men of the 56th Massachusetts were attached to the Second Brigade, Second Division of the IX Corps.

The regiment participated with two divisions of the IX Corps and two divisions of the V Corps in the Battle of Peebles' Farm on September 30. This effort to pressure the right flank of the Confederate lines led to calamity for parts of the IX Corps. In the late afternoon, troops under Confederate Maj. Gen. Henry Heth mounted a sweeping counterattack which took IX Corps division under Brig. Gen. Robert Potter (including the 56th Massachusetts) completely by surprise. Three Union regiments were encircled and forced to surrender. The 56th Massachusetts escaped with the rest of their brigade but lost one killed, eight wounded and 30 captured.

The 56th Massachusetts spent the winter of 1864–1865 at Fort Alexander Hays, a fortification near the left flank of the Petersburg siege lines. They remained there conducting picket duty without much incident until the general Union assault on the Petersburg lines which took place on April 1 and 2, 1865. The 56th Massachusetts captured a Confederate fortification across from their position known as Battery 27 and held it against counterattacks. The regiment lost three killed and 13 wounded in their final engagement.

== Return and mustering out ==
The regiment took part in the Appomattox Campaign in a peripheral way. As Lee's army abandoned Petersburg and retreated westward, the 56th Massachusetts marched with their division as far as Burkeville, Virginia. They were not on the front lines during the final battles. After Lee's surrender, the 56th Massachusetts was ordered to march for City Point, Virginia—a distance of some 60 miles which they completed in three days. From there they were shipped to Alexandria, Virginia where they performed routine duties until July 12 when they were sent back to Massachusetts.

The 56th Massachusetts was mustered out at Camp Meigs near Boston on July 22, 1865.

== Notable members ==
- George Willard Coy, first sergeant

== See also ==
- Massachusetts in the Civil War
- List of Massachusetts Civil War units
