= 44th Massachusetts Infantry Regiment =

44th Regiment Massachusetts Volunteer Infantry
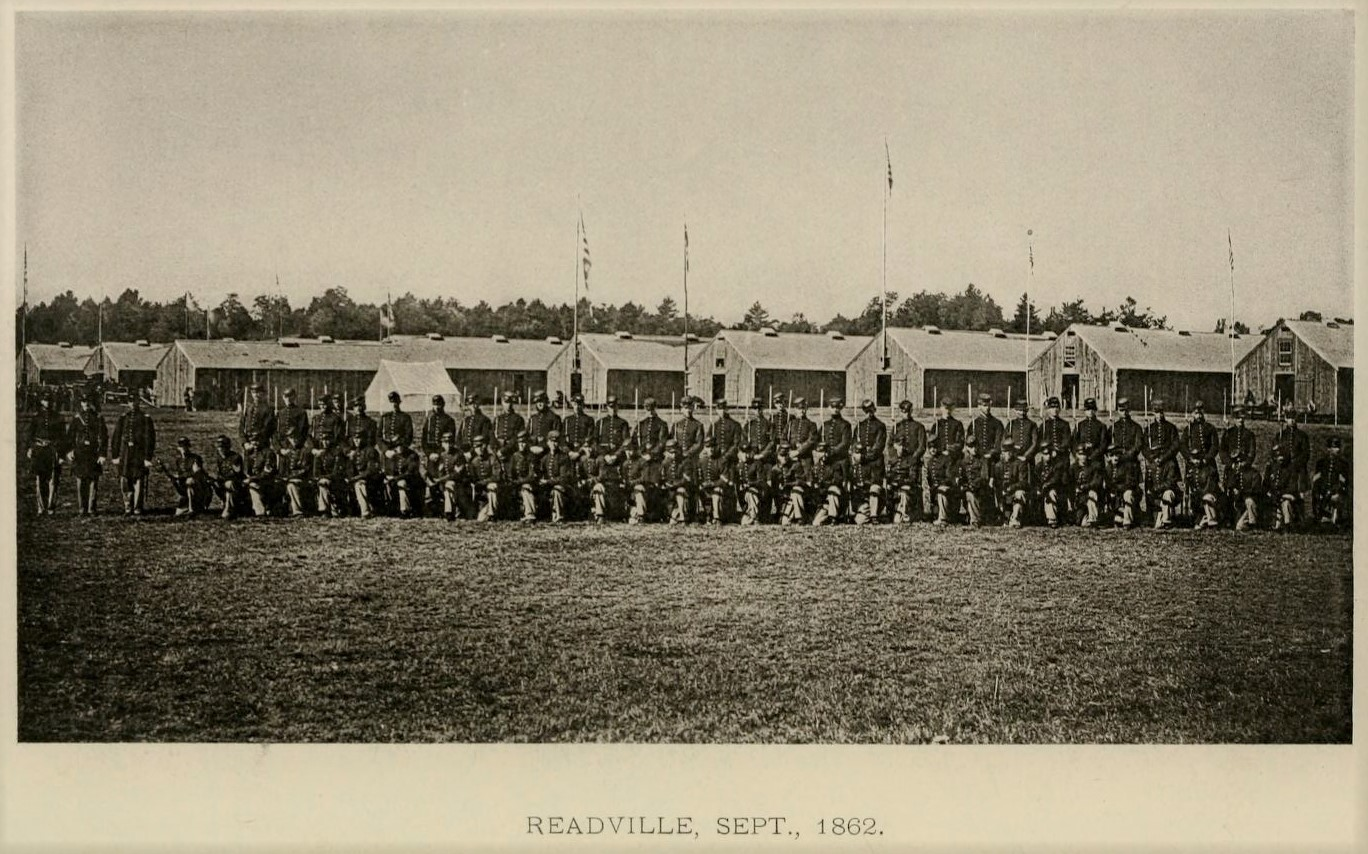
- 44th Massachusetts Infantry, Company E, training at Camp Meigs, Readville, MA
- Active: September 12, 1862 – July 21, 1863
- Country: United States
- Allegiance: Union
- Branch: Union Army
- Type: Infantry
- Size: Regiment
- Part of: In 1863: 2nd Brigade, 4th Division, XVIII Corps
- Engagements: American Civil War

The 44th Regiment Massachusetts Volunteer Infantry was a regiment of infantry that served in the Union Army during the American Civil War. Its nucleus was the 4th Battalion Massachusetts Volunteer Militia, known as the "New England Guards". An old state militia unit dating back to the Revolution, the 4th Battalion was called upon to serve garrison duty at Fort Independence shortly after the beginning of the Civil War. After President Abraham Lincoln's August 1862 call for 300,000 men to serve for nine months the 4th Battalion was given permission to recruit to a full regiment and to muster into federal service.

The regiment trained at Camp Meigs in Readville, Massachusetts just outside of Boston. They departed Massachusetts on October 24, assigned to Maj. Gen. John G. Foster's Department of North Carolina, later designated as the XVIII Corps. The regiment was stationed in New Bern, North Carolina. They saw their first combat during the Battle of Rawl's Mills, North Carolina in November 1862. In December, the regiment took part in the Goldsborough Expedition. The objective of this maneuver was to disrupt the Confederate supply line along the Wilmington and Weldon Railroad by destroying the Goldsborough Bridge. During this expedition, was lightly engaged in the Battles of Kinston and Goldsborough Bridge. In March and April 1863, they participated in the Siege of Washington, North Carolina. In late April, the regiment moved to New Bern where, for the next two months, they participated in patrols and reconnaissance expeditions.

The regiment returned to Boston on June 10 and was mustered out on June 18. On July 14, the unit was called upon to enforce law and order in New York City following the tumultuous New York Draft Riots. After a week of service there, they returned home. During their service in North Carolina, the regiment lost 12 men killed in action or mortally wounded and 29 by disease.

== See also ==
- Massachusetts in the Civil War
- List of Massachusetts Civil War units
- Bowen, James L (1889). Massachusetts in the War 1861–1865. Springfield, MA: Clark W Bryer + Co. OCLC 1986476.
- Dyer, Frederick H. (1908). A Compendium of the War of the Rebellion. Des Moines: Dyer Publishing Co. OCLC 247098372.
- Gardner, James Brown (1887). Record of the Service of the Forty-fourth Massachusetts Volunteer Militia in North Carolina, August 1862 to May 1863. Boston, MA: Priv. Print. OCLC 163269385.
