= 47th Massachusetts Infantry Regiment =

- Active: October 16, 1862 – September 1, 1863
- Country: United States
- Allegiance: Union
- Branch: Union Army
- Type: Infantry
- Size: Regiment
- Part of: In 1863: 2nd Brigade, 2nd Division, XIX Corps
- Engagements: American Civil War

The 47th Massachusetts Infantry Regiment was a regiment of infantry that served in the Union Army during the American Civil War. It was one of the 18 Massachusetts regiments formed in response to President Abraham Lincoln's August 1862 call for 300,000 men to serve for nine months. The unit was known as the "Merchant's Guard Regiment" having been recruited primarily through the efforts of Boston merchant Lucius B. Marsh, who became the regiment's Colonel and commanding officer. The regiment's service was unusual in that it never saw combat as a full regiment. Two detached companies saw minor skirmishing without casualties. Instead of active combat duty, the regiment served guard and provost duty in various camps and fortifications in and about New Orleans, Louisiana.

== Service in Louisiana ==
The 47th Massachusetts Infantry Regiment trained at Camp Edwin M. Stanton in Boxford, Massachusetts and Camp Meigs in Readville, Massachusetts. On November 29, 1862, they left Boston for New York City where troops were being gathered to reinforce the Army of the Gulf under Major General Nathaniel P. Banks. On December 21, 1862, the regiment boarded a steamship for and reached New Orleans on December 31. The regiment was initially stationed at the United States Barracks, the former headquarters of the Louisiana State Guard. In January 1863, several companies of the unit were detached and ordered to serve guard duty at various locations in New Orleans.

On March 12, 1863 all but one of the companies (Company B), were recalled and the regiment went into camp at Metairie Race Course. The location had been converted into a military camp by the Confederates prior to the capture of New Orleans by the Admiral David Farragut. The location was described as extremely unhealthy. Colonel Marsh was given command over the camp and the several units there. He worked to put the site into better order and also focused on improving the 47th Massachusetts in drill and discipline. During their time at Metairie, companies were detached periodically for brief reconnaissance missions closer to Confederate positions. One company encountered Confederates at Amite River on April 17, 1863 and a brief skirmish followed with no casualties. Another company was involved in a larger engagement, the Battle of LaFourche Crossing on June 20, 1863, but did not suffer any casualties.

On May 19, 1863, the regiment was ordered to Camp Parapet, about two miles up the Mississippi River from New Orleans. Colonel Marsh took command of the post. Since the Union's occupation of the area in 1862, Freedmen had gathered at Camp Parapet in large numbers seeking protection of the Union Army. They were organized into "colonies" or camps. While in command of the post, Colonel Marsh oversaw the organization of the 2nd Louisiana Engineer Regiment, a unit composed of African-American volunteers.

== Mustering out ==
When their term of enlistment expired, the regiment sailed up the Mississippi River to Cairo, Illinois. From there they traveled by train to Boston. The regiment mustered out on September 1, 1863. They lost one man killed in an accident and 37 by disease.

== See also ==
- Massachusetts in the Civil War
- List of Massachusetts Civil War units
