= 15th Massachusetts Battery =

- Active: February 17, 1863 – August 4, 1865
- Country: United States
- Branch: Union Army
- Type: Field artillery
- Size: Battery
- Part of: In 1864: Defenses of New Orleans, Department of the Gulf
- Engagements: American Civil War

Commanders
- 1st: Captain Timothy Pearson
- 2nd: 1st Lt. James W. Kirk
- 3rd: 1st Lt. Albert Rowse

The 15th Massachusetts Battery (or 15th Battery Massachusetts Light Artillery) was an artillery battery that served in the Union Army during the American Civil War. The unit was organized partly at Camp Chase in Lowell, Massachusetts and partly at Fort Warren during the winter of 1862–1863. The majority of its members were mustered into federal service on February 17, 1863. It was assigned to the Department of the Gulf commanded by Major General Nathaniel P. Banks and departed Massachusetts by steamship on March 9. During its term, the unit suffered from a large number of desertions and gained an unfortunate reputation despite the service of its many loyal members.

The unit arrived in New Orleans on April 9, 1863. Before being issued guns, they made a brief expedition on foot to Brashear City, Louisiana but soon returned to New Orleans. They were assigned to garrison two small forts just outside New Orleans, each armed with four 32-pounder guns mounted in barbettes. One of these was located at Bayou St. John and the other at Gentilly. They remained posted there from June 3 until December 29.

In February 1864, the 15th Massachusetts Battery took part in an uneventful expedition to Madisonville, Louisiana, returning to New Orleans at the end of that month. It was posted at Terrell's Cotton Press in New Orleans from May 5 to October 17. On the latter date, the battery boarded a steamship for an expedition into Arkansas. They reached the mouth of the White River where they remained until November 7, then moved again by steamship up the White River to DeValls Bluff, Arkansas. After 20 days, the unit moved to Memphis, Tennessee remaining there for the month of December 1864. On January 1, 1865, the battery returned to Louisiana.

At the end of February 1865, the battery was transferred to the Second Division of the XIII Corps and embarked for Pensacola, Florida. There it joined in preparations for the Mobile Campaign. The battery was engaged during the Battle of Fort Blakeley from April 2 to 9 outside Mobile. After the fall of Mobile, their division was briefly posted in Selma, Alabama but soon returned to Mobile.

On June 30, 1865, at Mobile, the battery turned in its horses and guns. On July 20, they were ordered home to Boston which was reached on August 1. The 15th Massachusetts Battery was mustered out on August 4, 1865. The unit lost one man killed in action and 27 by disease for a total of 28.

== See also ==
- Massachusetts in the Civil War
- List of Massachusetts Civil War units
