= Camp Meigs =

American Civil War training camp in Massachusetts

Coordinates: 42°13′50.13″N 71°8′3.00″W

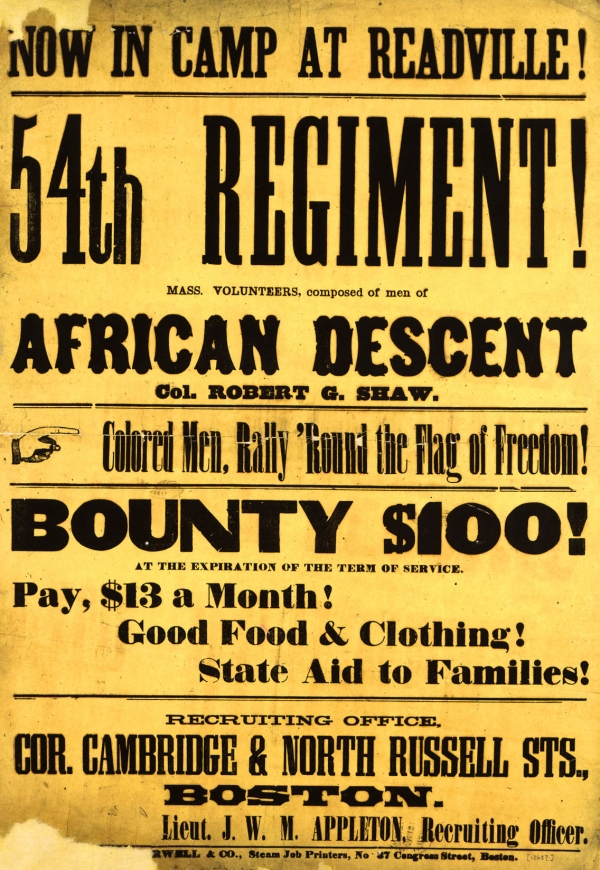
Recruiting poster, 1863.

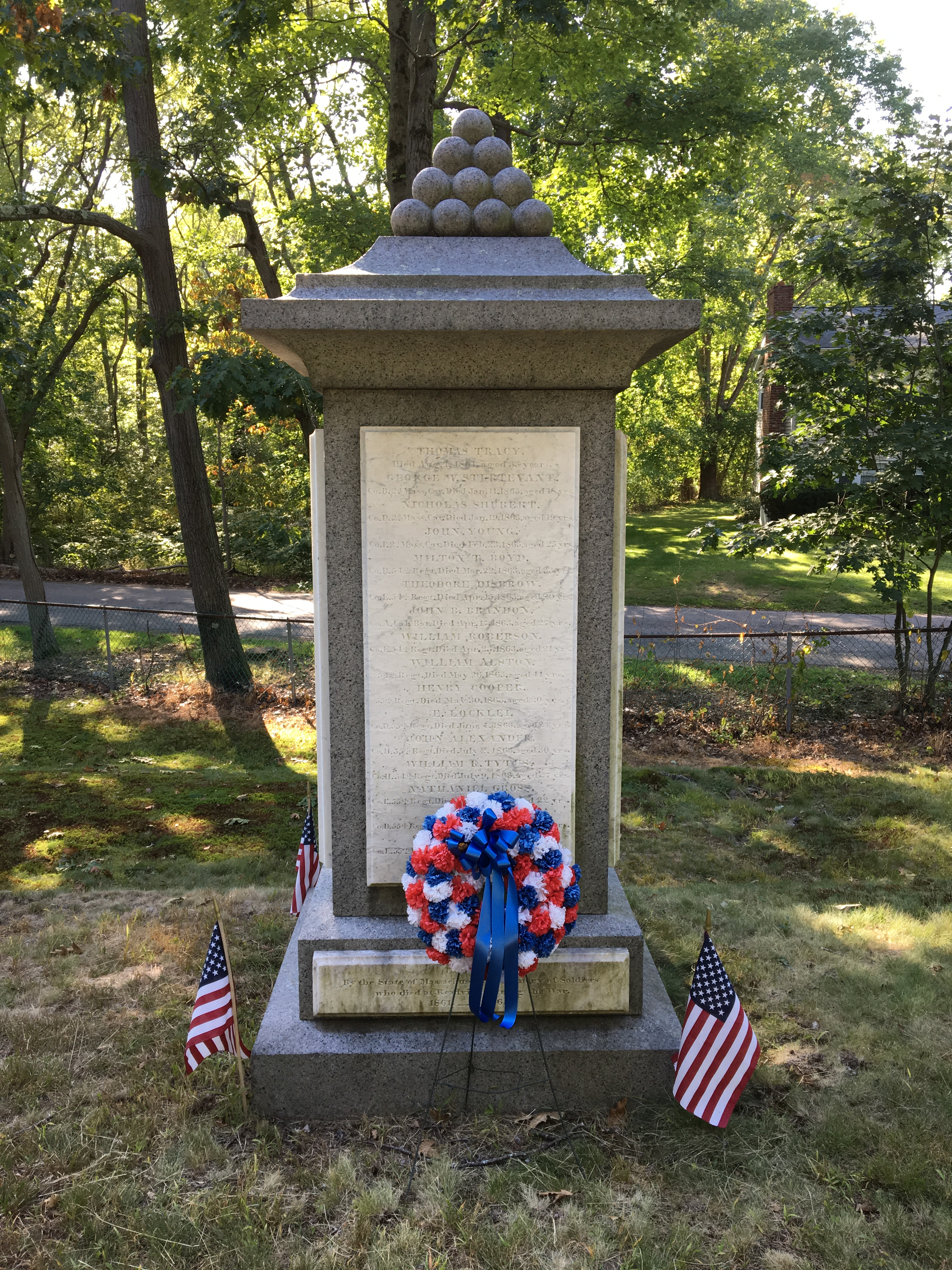
Monument to soldiers who died at Camp Meigs in the Old Village Cemetery

Camp Meigs is a former American Civil War training camp that existed from 1862 to 1865 in Readville, Massachusetts. It was combined from the former Camp Brigham (formed to train the 18th Regiment Massachusetts Volunteer Infantry) and Camp Massasoit (formed to train the 24th Regiment Massachusetts Volunteer Infantry) and trained the 54th Regiment Massachusetts Volunteer Infantry, among others. The 54th regiment was one of the first official African-American units in the United States during the Civil War. The former camps were merged into Camp Meigs in August 1862. Camp Meigs was named for Montgomery C. Meigs.

Other units that trained there include the 11th, 43rd, 44th, 45th, 47th, 48th, 55th, 56th, 58th, 59th, 60th and 62nd regiments of infantry; the 1st, 2nd, 4th and 5th regiments of cavalry; the 2nd regiment of heavy artillery; and the 5th, 9th, 11th, 12th, 13th, 14th, and 16th batteries of light artillery. The 6th, 18th, 22nd, 23rd, 24th, and 26th Unattached Companies Massachusetts Volunteer Militia were also at the camp during the war. It was the busiest training camp in Massachusetts.

In 1869, the land was obtained by the Norfolk Agricultural Association, improved upon, and ultimately became the Readville Race Track. On December 12, 1915, the newly formed Sturtevant Aeroplane Company tested its new A-3 Battleplane prototype on the Readville field, becoming the first American airplane engineered specifically for air combat. The A-3 was designed by Grover C. Loening, most recently the Army’s aeronautical engineer at San Diego and hired by Sturtevant. The Battleplane featured a water-cooled 140 hp Sturtevant V-8 engine with two removable 8-foot × 2.5-foot nacelles positioned mid-wing for machine gunners to fire outside the propeller arc. The test flight was piloted by Lt. Byron Jones.

By World War II, the site was largely abandoned, although U.S. Navy pilots from Squantum Naval Air Station flying their Stearman biplanes would practice "touch and go" landings on the remnants of the old oval track.

== See also ==
- List of military installations in Massachusetts
