= 16th Massachusetts Battery =

11th Massachusetts Battery
- Active: March 11, 1864 – July 13, 1865
- Country: United States
- Branch: Union Army
- Type: Field artillery
- Size: Battery
- Part of: 1st Separate Brigade, XXII Corps
- Engagements: American Civil War

Commanders
- Commanding officer: Captain Henry D. Scott

The 16th Massachusetts Battery (or 16th Battery Massachusetts Light Artillery) was an artillery battery that served in the Union Army during the American Civil War. The last battery of light artillery sent by Massachusetts, it was organized during the late winter of 1864 at Camp Meigs just outside of Boston. The battery was commanded by Captain Henry D. Scott of New Bedford, Massachusetts. The majority of enlisted men and officers were mustered into federal service on March 11, 1864. They departed Massachusetts on April 19, 1864, arriving at Washington of April 21. The unit was directed to Camp Barry just outside Washington and was there outfitted with 3-inch field guns and horses. It was assigned to the XXII Corps in the defenses of Washington. Serving primarily in the fortifications around Washington, the battery never saw active combat.

On June 1, 1864, the battery turned in their guns and horses being assigned to heavy artillery duty on the south of Alexandria, Virginia. The unit was divided into two sections, one serving at Fort Lyon and the other at Fort Weed. On July 10, as Confederate General Jubal Early's forces threatened Washington, the men of the 16th Massachusetts Battery were briefly moved to reinforce Fort Kearny on the northwest side of Washington. After this threat diminished, the unit returned to Camp Barry. There they were re-supplied with field artillery equipment, including four 12-pounder guns and horses.

The battery was transferred to Albany, New York on September 5 and was stationed at the Troy Road Barracks. It remained there until November 16 when it returned by train to Camp Barry. There it received an additional two 12-pounder guns, bringing the unit up to full armament as a battery of light artillery. On December 16, the battery moved to Fairfax County, Virginia, one section was stationed at Vienna, Virginia and the other at Fairfax Station. The battery remained at these posts through the winter and into the spring of 1865. In March 1865, the battery accompanied the 8th Illinois Cavalry on a march to Loudoun Valley, Virginia. Aside from this, their service in 1865 was uneventful.

On June 18, 1865, the battery marched from Fairfax to Washington and turned in their guns and equipment. They reached Boston on June 22 and after some delay at Camp Meigs were mustered out on July 13, 1865. The unit had no casualties in combat but lost six men to disease.

== See also ==
- Massachusetts in the Civil War
- List of Massachusetts Civil War units
