= 59th Massachusetts Infantry Regiment =

59th Massachusetts Volunteer Infantry Regiment
- Active: April 21, 1864 - August 9, 1865
- Country: United States
- Branch: Union Army
- Type: Infantry
- Size: Regiment
- Part of: In 1864: 1st Brigade, 1st Division, IX Corps

Commanders
- Colonel: Jacob P. Gould

Insignia
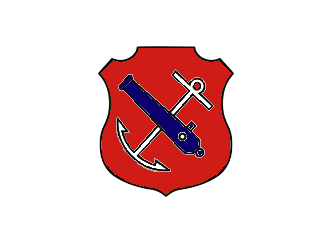
- IX Corps (1st Division) badge

The 59th Massachusetts Volunteer Infantry Regiment was a unit of the Union Army during the American Civil War. It was one of the four Massachusetts "Veteran Regiments" raised in the winter of 1863–64. Recruits joining these regiments were required to have served at least nine months in a prior unit. The regiment was attached to the IX Corps of the Army of the Potomac and took part in Lieutenant General Ulysses S. Grant's Overland Campaign in the spring of 1864. They participated in heavy combat during several battles including the Battles of the Wilderness, Spotsylvania Courthouse, and the Crater.

== Service ==
The 59th Massachusetts Volunteer Infantry Regiment was organized at Readville, Boston on April 25, 1864, and was the fourth "Veteran Regiment" to be raised in Massachusetts during the American Civil War. Recruits joining a "Veteran Regiment" were required to have served at least nine months in a prior unit, and he conditions of enlistment were the same as those in the other "Veteran Regiments". The first eight companies of the regiment were mustered into service between January 14 and April 18. The regiment moved to Alexandria, Virginia on April 26–28. It was attached to the 1st Brigade, 1st Division, IX Corps, Army of the Potomac, until September 1864, and it participated in Army of the Potomac's operations throughout its service. On May 23, 1865, it participated in the Grand Review of the Army of the Potomac. The regiment was mustered out on July 14, and on the following day boarded transportation for home. Arriving at Readville on July 18, on the 26th its members were paid off and discharged.

== Casualties ==
The regiment suffered casualties of 48 men killed in action, 99 died from wounds or disease, and 198 wounded.

== See also ==
- List of Massachusetts Civil War units
- Massachusetts in the Civil War
