= 6th Massachusetts Battery =

- Active: January 20, 1862 – August 7, 1865
- Country: United States
- Branch: Union Army
- Type: Field artillery
- Size: Battery
- Part of: In 1863: Artillery, First Division (Augur), XIX Corps
- Engagements: American Civil War

Commanders
- 1st: Captain Charles Everett
- 2nd: 1st Lt. William W. Carruth
- 3rd: 1st Lt. John F. Phelps

The 6th Massachusetts Battery (or 6th Battery, Massachusetts Light Artillery) was an artillery battery that served in the Union Army during the American Civil War. The unit was one of the Massachusetts regiments organized in response to President Abraham Lincoln's call on May 2, 1861 for volunteer troops to serve a term of three-years. The battery trained at Camp Chase in Lowell, Massachusetts. It was assigned to the Department of the Gulf under Major General Benjamin F. Butler and departed Boston by steamship on February 8, 1862. At that time, the unit comprised 145 men armed with two rifled and four smoothbore six-pounder field guns.

The battery performed garrison duty at Ship Island off the Mississippi coast, which served as the staging point for Butler's expedition, until April 15. After proceeding on to New Orleans, the battery served garrison duty in that city until June. One section, consisting of two guns, was temporarily detached and took part in minor raids against Confederate cavalry west of New Orleans. On June 18, the battery was reunited in Baton Rouge, Louisiana. Here the battery was again divided and two sections were deployed in demonstrations against Vicksburg, Mississippi for five weeks. Although only lightly engaged during their actions near Vicksburg, the battery suffered its first casualty in battle with one man killed. The battery was reunited in Baton Rouge in July. The battery was heavily engaged in the Battle of Baton Rouge on August 5, 1862 and took additional casualties.

The unit wintered in Thibodaux, Louisiana and in April 1863 took part in the First Bayou Teche Campaign in western Louisiana, being engaged in the Battle of Fort Bisland among other actions. At the close of this campaign, one section of the battery remained at Point Coupee, Louisiana while the other two participated in the Siege of Port Hudson, Louisiana in May and June. During the first assault on Port Hudson in May, the right section of the battery advanced to within 300 yards of the Confederate fortifications and remained in that position for the duration of the siege. During the latter part of 1863, the battery was consolidated to a four gun battery due to losses in combat and from disease. It was stationed at various points in western Louisiana during the fall including Vermillionville and went into winter quarters at New Iberia.

In January 1864, 56 men (nearly the entire unit at that time) reenlisted for a second three-year term and returned to Massachusetts in April for a month's furlough. The 6th Battery returned to New Orleans in June and remained stationed there for the rest of the year, relatively inactive due to their small numbers. Over the course of the year, they received new recruits from Massachusetts until in January 1865 the unit numbered 169 men and was re-equipped with six guns. They remained on garrison duty in New Orleans until July 21, 1865 when they embarked for Boston.

The 6th Massachusetts Battery reached Boston August 1 and was mustered out at Camp Meigs on August 7, 1865. During their service, the unit lost six men killed in action or mortally wounded and 51 men who died from disease.

== See also ==
- Massachusetts in the Civil War
- List of Massachusetts Civil War units
