= 48th Massachusetts Infantry Regiment =

48th Regiment Massachusetts Volunteer Infantry
- Active: December 9, 1862 – September 23, 1863
- Country: United States
- Allegiance: Union
- Branch: Union Army
- Type: Infantry
- Size: Regiment
- Part of: In 1863: 1st Brigade, 1st Division, XIX Corps
- Engagements: American Civil War

Commanders
- Colonel: Eben F. Stone

The 48th Regiment Massachusetts Volunteer Infantry was a regiment of infantry that served in the Union Army during the American Civil War. It was one of the 18 Massachusetts regiments formed in response to President Abraham Lincoln's August 1862 call for 300,000 men to serve for nine months. It consisted of a combination of Essex County companies and Irish-American companies which caused some delay and friction during the unit's formation. The regiment was assigned to the Department of the Gulf and saw heavy combat during the Siege of Port Hudson.

== Formation and early duty ==
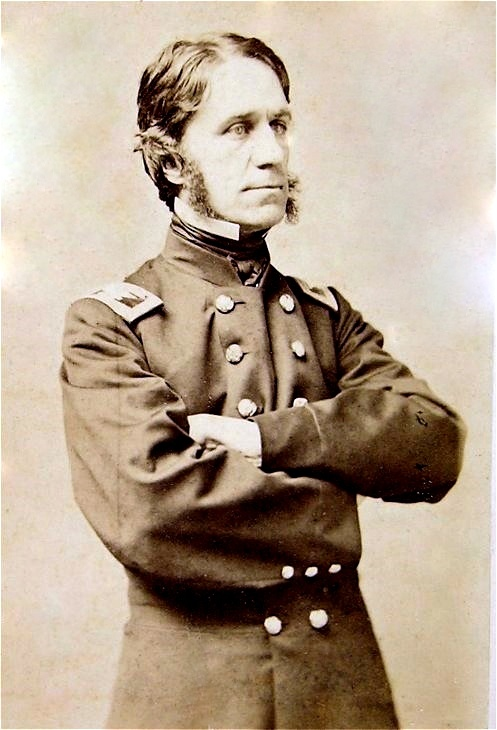
Col. Eben F. Stone

The formation of the 48th Massachusetts was marked by some dissension as it was originally intended to be an Essex County regiment and eight companies were raised from that county for that purpose. They gathered and began training at Camp Lander in Wenham, Massachusetts. Due to the urgent need for regiments in the Department of the Gulf in preparation for Major General Nathaniel P. Banks's planned expedition against Port Hudson, Louisiana, two of the Essex companies were detached and the remaining six companies were combined with four Irish-American companies. The latter had intended to fill out their numbers and form a new Irish regiment. The two groups rendezvoused at Camp Meigs just outside of Boston and began training. The unexpected combination led to dissatisfaction and a number of desertions from camp. The officers of the Essex companies protested the change in a letter to the Governor but their request to form an Essex regiment was denied. The reassignments and difficulty in recruitment somewhat delayed the mustering in of the unit which was finally completed on December 9, 1862.

Colonel Eben F. Stone, a prominent lawyer from Newburyport, Massachusetts, commanded the regiment. Lieutenant Colonel James O'Brien of Charlestown, Massachusetts, who was originally to command the intended Irish regiment, served as second-in-command. The 48th Massachusetts departed Massachusetts on December 27 for New Orleans, Louisiana. After stays in New York City and Fortress Monroe, the regiment reached their destination on February 1, 1863. They were stationed at Camp Banks in Baton Rouge. Their first field duty consisted of a reconnaissance towards Port Hudson with other units of the IX Corps from March 13–20. They did not see any combat during this reconnaissance and afterwards returned to their post at Camp Banks.

== Siege of Port Hudson ==
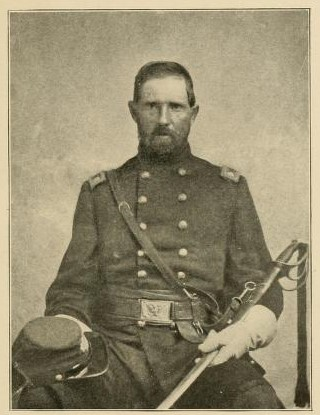
Lt. Col. James O'Brien was killed during the first assault on Port Hudson

They remained at Camp Banks for two months serving uneventful duty as planning for the expedition against Port Hudson encountered logistical delays. The expedition got underway in late May 1862 and the 48th Massachusetts left Camp Banks as part of the expedition on May 21. The regiment saw its first combat before the day was out as Union forces just outside of Baton Rouge encountered a Confederate column from Port Hudson precipitating the Battle of Plains Store. The 48th Massachusetts was posted in support of an artillery battery and did not see action during the day. However, that night a Confederate unit got around their flank and attacked them from the rear, causing much confusion. The unit suffered casualties of 2 men killed, 7 wounded and 11 prisoners. During this engagement, Union troops succeeded in cutting off the last route of escape from Port Hudson.

On May 27, the 48th Massachusetts took part in the first assault on Port Hudson. 200 volunteers were called on from their division for a storming party to lead the division's charge and lay down fascines to allow passage over ditches and trenches. Such a storming party was known as a "Forlorn Hope." The 48th Massachusetts supplied half the number of volunteers needed for this detail. During the assault, however, the extremely rugged ground and tangle of felled trees proved too difficult and neither the storming party nor the main assault made sufficient progress. The 48th Massachusetts reached the foot of the Confederate earthworks and enduring constant firing from the enemy. The regiment lost six killed and 41 wounded during this assault, including Lt. Col. James O'Brien. O'Brien was shot and killed as he led the "Forlorn Hope" and exposed himself to severe fire largely in an effort to redeem himself and the regiment for his error in allowing the enemy to outflank them at Plains Store.

As Union forces settled in for a siege, the 48th Massachusetts returned to Baton Rouge for a short time to serve guard duty. Many in the regiment suffered from disease at this time and when they were summoned back to Port Hudson, many were in a weakened state. In June they returned to the Port Hudson siege lines and participated in the second assault on the city on June 14. The regiment fired in support of several units assigned to storm the enemy's earthworks. This second assault also failed. The 48th Massachusetts lost two men killed and eleven wounded. The Confederate troops in Port Hudson eventually surrendered on July 9, 1863.

== Battle of Cox's Plantation ==
Following the surrender, the 48th Massachusetts immediately moved with their division to Donaldsonville, Louisiana as part of operations to engage the remaining Confederate forces in western Louisiana. The regiment fought in the Battle of Cox's Plantation on July 11 and 12. Confederate forces pushed superior Union numbers back six miles during this engagement. During the withdrawal, the 48th Massachusetts lost one man killed, seven wounded and 23 captured. This was the regiment's final engagement.

== Mustering out ==
On August 1, 1863, the regiment returned to Baton Rouge and boarded a steamship for Cairo, Illinois. From there, they traveled by railroad to Boston. They were mustered out on September 3. The total number of deaths consisted of 19 killed in action and mortally wounded and 50 men lost due to disease.

== See also ==
- Massachusetts in the Civil War
- List of Massachusetts Civil War units
