= 4th Massachusetts Heavy Artillery Regiment =

4th Massachusetts Heavy Artillery Regiment, U.S. Volunteers
- Active: August 1864 to 17 June 1865
- Country: United States of America
- Allegiance: Union
- Branch: United States Army
- Type: Heavy artillery
- Size: 1829

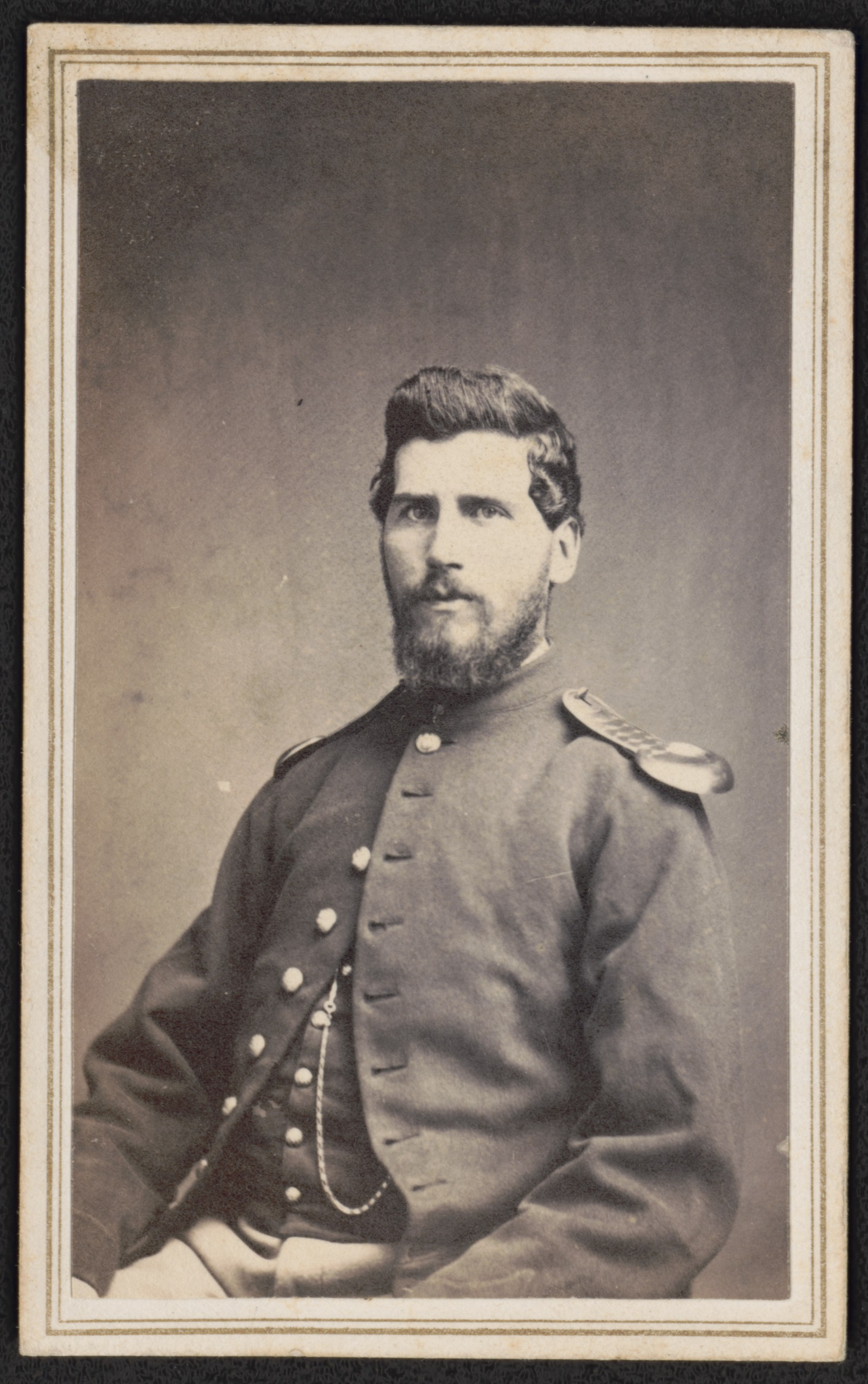
Private Joseph N. Walls of Co. G, 4th Massachusetts Heavy Artillery Regiment. From the Liljenquist Family Collection of Civil War Photographs, Prints and Photographs Division, Library of Congress

The 4th Massachusetts Volunteer Heavy Artillery Regiment was a unit that served in the Union Army during the latter part of the American Civil War. It was formed from former Unattached Companies of Heavy Artillery raised by Massachusetts to serve the state and for the defenses of Washington, D.C.

== History ==
In the late summer of 1864, fourteen companies of heavy artillery were raised throughout Massachusetts for the purpose of coastal defense of the state. They were to be "unattached", thus not part of a regiment, and sent to various military locations for a one-year term. They were numbered 17 through 30, and were the Unattached Companies of Heavy Artillery. They encamped on Gallops Island in Boston Harbor, where they organized and were mustered in during latter part of August and into the first days of September 1864. In September, they were ordered to Washington, DC for garrison duty in the forts surrounding the capital. The last companies to leave, the 29th and 30th, left on 26 Sept and 29 Oct, respectively.

On 12 Nov 1864, a War Department order consolidated 12 of the companies, numbered 17 through 28, into one regiment, the 4th Regiment Massachusetts Heavy Artillery. Col William Sterling King, formerly of the 35th Massachusetts Infantry, was put in command. They remained in Washington for the remainder of the war, until their mustering out on 17 June 1865.

=== 29th and 30th Unattached Companies ===
While the 17th through 28th Unattached Companies were combined into a single regiment, the 29th and 30th remained single units. They also served in garrisoning the forts around the capital until their time of mustering out on 16 June 1865. The 29th, with 157 officers and enlisted men, lost 2 to disease, while the 30th lost none of their 150 volunteers.

== Complement ==
The regiment consisted of 72 officers and 1757 enlisted men, 21 of them dying by disease or accident.

== See also ==
- List of Massachusetts Civil War Units
- Massachusetts in the American Civil War
