= 1st Massachusetts Heavy Artillery Battalion =

1st Battalion Massachusetts Volunteer Heavy Artillery
- Active: February 1862 to October 1865
- Country: United States
- Allegiance: Union
- Branch: United States Army
- Type: Heavy artillery
- Size: 2,524

The 1st Battalion of Massachusetts Volunteer Heavy Artillery was a unit that served in the Union Army during the American Civil War. It was organized from several unattached companies of heavy artillery already raised and mustered into a three-year service for the defenses of the Massachusetts coast.

== Structure and History ==
Company A

The 1st Unattached Company was formed in February 1862 for the garrisoning of Fort Warren in Boston Harbor. They remained here until 24 December 1864, when ordered to Champlain, New York due to "trouble being feared on the Canadian border". They returned to Fort Warren on 13 May 1865, and were mustered out on 20 October. Captain Stephen Cabot of this company would become the major of the battalion.

Company B

The 2nd Unattached Company was organized in October and November 1862, joining the 1st in garrison duty at Fort Warren. In July 1863, when a draft riot broke out in Boston, they were sent to restore order. In August, they were stationed at the Fort at Clark's Point, New Bedford, and remained there until its mustering out on 29 June 1865.

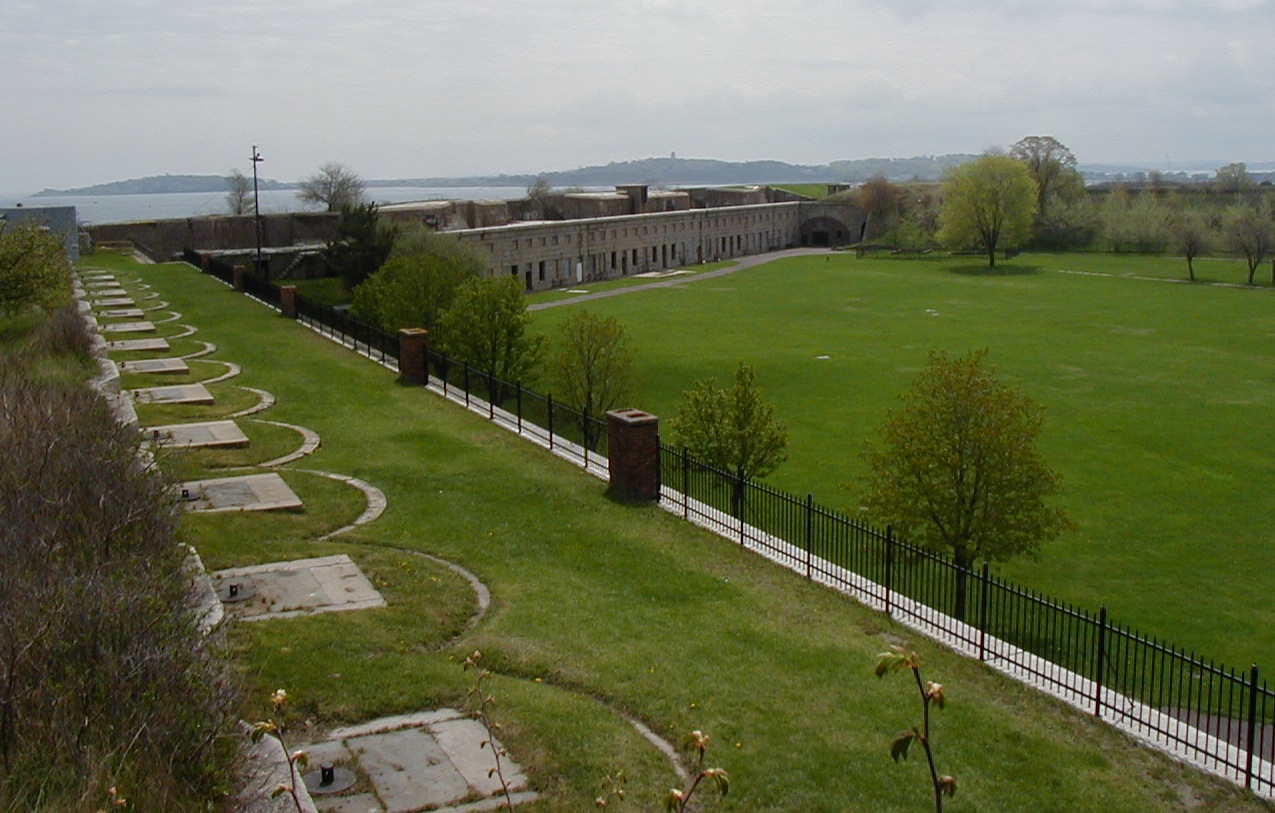
The parade ground of Fort Warren

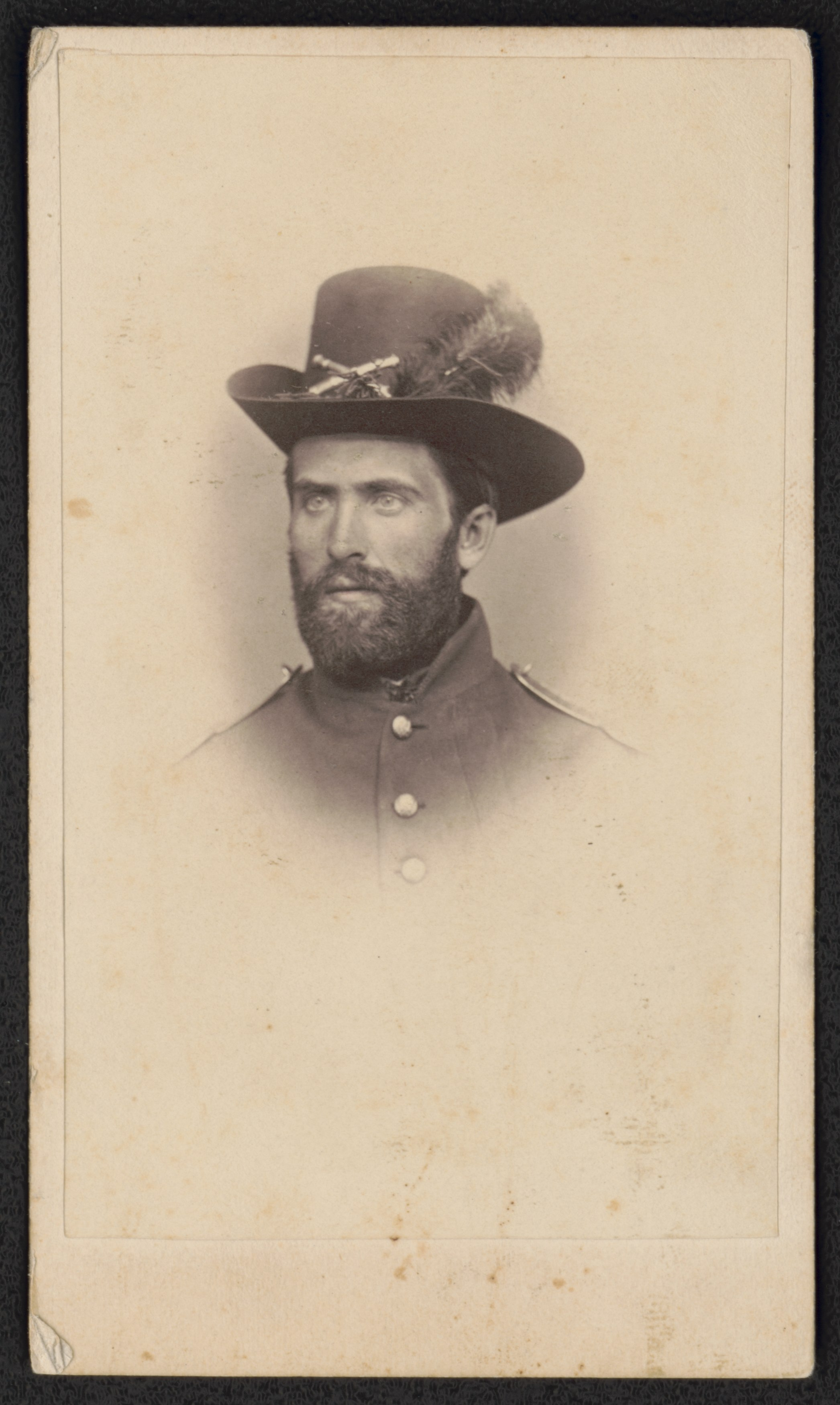
Private Frank I. Snell of Co. E, 1st Massachusetts Heavy Artillery Battalion. From the Liljenquist Family Collection of Civil War Photographs, Prints and Photographs Division, Library of Congress

Company C

The 4th Unattached, being mustered in on 22 April 1863, then became Company C when the battalion was formed that month. They were also stationed at Fort Warren during most of their term of service. During the Boston draft in July, the company was sent there to maintain order, except for a detachment that went to Concord, New Hampshire to assist in keeping order during the draft taking place there, and stayed until September. The company was mustered out on 20 October 1865.

Company D

The battalion being formed by the three mentioned unattached companies at the end of April 1863, they were later joined by the 5th Unattached Co. after it was mustered in on 6 June 1863 and became Company D.

The four previously unattached companies were three-year units, and two additional companies (Companies E + F) were subsequently raised in August 1864 for one-year terms. Except where mentioned previously, the companies were all stationed at forts in Boston Harbor, with detachments from them being sent to other military locations along the coast.

Three of the companies were mustered out in June 1865, while the rest of the battalion stayed in service until September and October.

== Complement ==
The First Battalion consisted of 39 officers and 1272 enlisted men.

== Losses ==
The Battalion lost 9 officers and 232 men as a result of gunshot wounds.An additional 2 officers and 241 men died of disease or accidents.

== See also ==
- List of Massachusetts Civil War Units
- Massachusetts in the American Civil War
