= 2nd Massachusetts Battery =

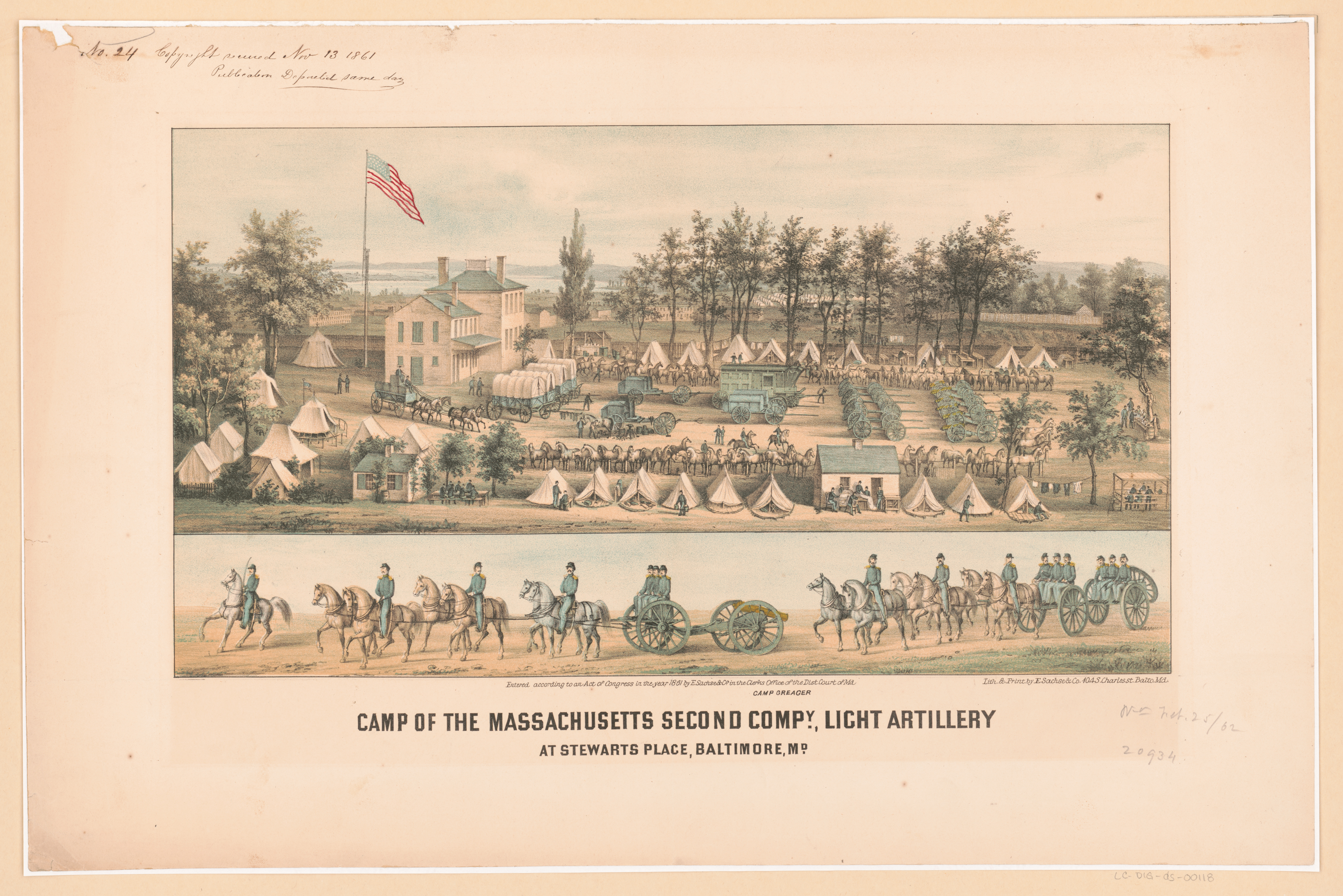
- Active: July 31, 1861 – August 11, 1865
- Country: United States
- Branch: Union Army
- Type: Field artillery
- Size: Battery
- Part of: In 1863: Fourth Division (Grover), XIX Corps

Commanders
- Current commander: Captain Ormand F. Nims

The 2nd Massachusetts Battery (or 2nd Battery, Massachusetts Light Artillery) was an artillery battery that served in the Union army during the American Civil War. The unit was initially known as "Cobb's Light Artillery" for its first commander, Major Moses Cobb. An experienced officer of the Massachusetts militia, Cobb was selected to organize and command the battery on April 20, 1861, however he did not go with the unit when it departed for the field. The unit was later known as "Nim's Battery" after its subsequent commanding officer, Capt. Ormand F. Nims. It was one of the Massachusetts regiments organized in response to President Abraham Lincoln's call on May 2, 1861, for volunteer troops to serve a term of three-years. The 2nd Massachusetts Battery was the first unit of artillery to be recruited in Massachusetts for three-years service. The battery trained at Camp Adams in Quincy, Massachusetts, and was mustered into federal service on July 31, 1861.

Departing the Boston area on August 8, the battery first served garrison duty near Baltimore and in operations in eastern Maryland. In February 1862, it was assigned to the Department of the Gulf under Major General Benjamin F. Butler and shipped for Louisiana on April 19. The regiment saw combat during the early stages of the Siege of Vicksburg, and suffered badly from disease and general debility during the operations. After Maj. Gen. Nathaniel P. Banks took command of the Department of the Gulf, the battery participated in the Siege of Port Hudson, Louisiana. They also saw action during the Second Bayou Teche Campaign in western Louisiana and the Red River Campaign, during which their guns were captured at the Battle of Sabine Crossroads. They were resupplied with new guns in May 1864.

The original volunteers were mustered out on August 16, 1864, having served their three-year term. Some of these chose to reenlist and, receiving new recruits, the unit went on to serve an additional year, seeing action during operations against Fort Blakeley, Alabama. The unit was mustered out on August 11, 1865.

== See also ==
- Massachusetts in the Civil War
- List of Massachusetts Civil War units
