= Camp Lander =

Former Massachusetts militia camp

Coordinates: 42°36′35.66″N 70°52′44.31″W

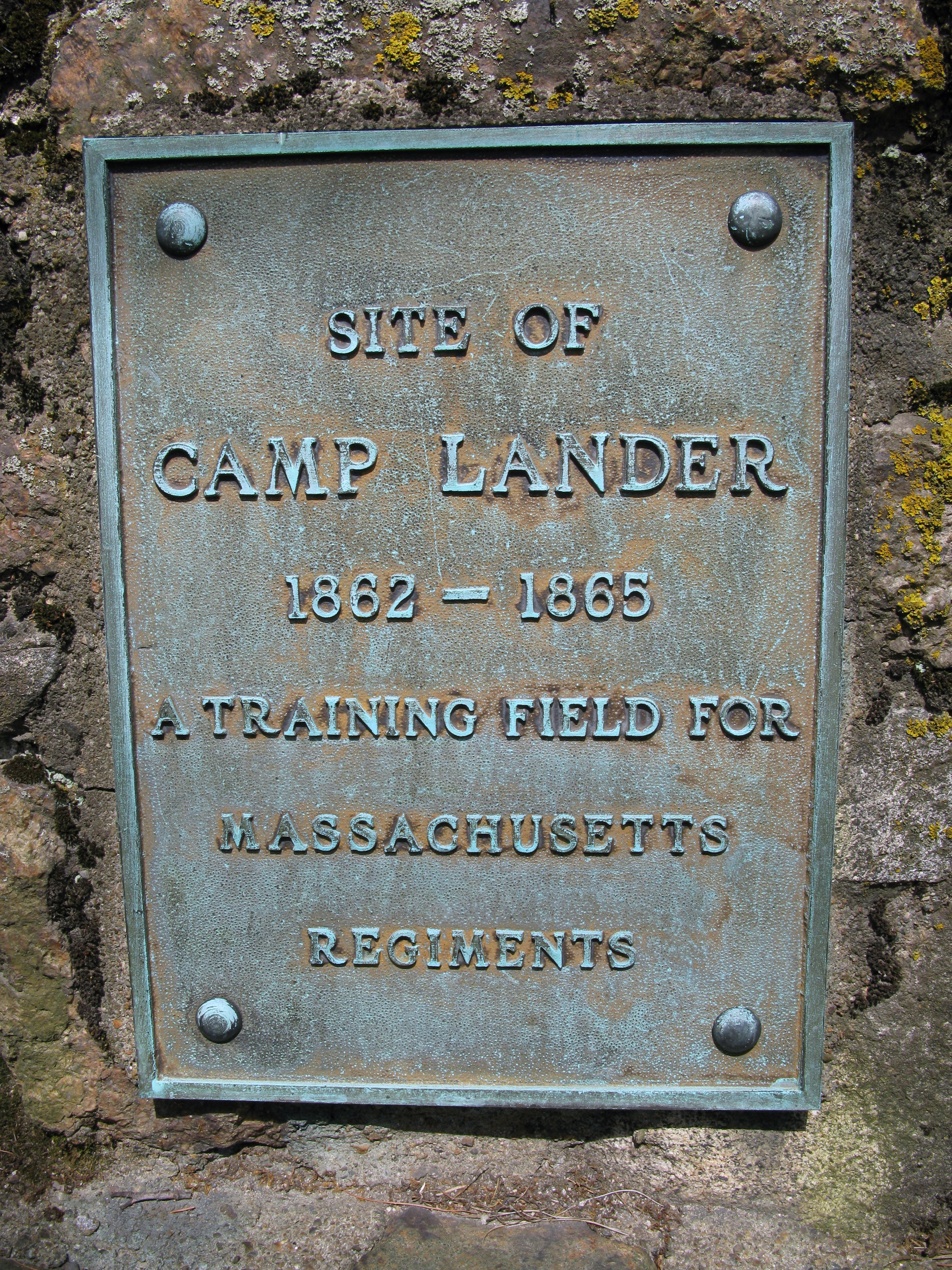
Camp Lander Marker, Pingree Park, Wenham, Massachusetts

Camp Lander was a former Massachusetts militia camp active during 1862 and located in Wenham, Massachusetts. It was named for Brigadier General Frederick W. Lander, wounded at the Battle of Ball's Bluff, who died of disease almost three weeks later in March 1862. In September–December 1862, the 5th, 8th, and 48th Massachusetts Infantry Regiments trained at the camp. The site is now occupied by Pingree Park, on land donated by Harriet Pingree in 1916.

== See also ==
- List of military installations in Massachusetts
