= List of Massachusetts units in the American Civil War =

Units raised in Massachusetts during the American Civil War consisted of 62 regiments of infantry, six regiments of cavalry, 16 batteries of light artillery, four regiments of heavy artillery, two companies of sharpshooters, a handful of unattached battalions and 26 unattached companies. The following is a list of Massachusetts Civil War Units.

== Infantry ==
- 1st Battalion Massachusetts Volunteer Infantry
- 1st Regiment Massachusetts Volunteer Infantry
- 2nd Regiment Massachusetts Volunteer Infantry
- 3rd Regiment Massachusetts Volunteer Militia
- 3rd Battalion Massachusetts Rifles
- 4th Regiment Massachusetts Volunteer Militia
- 4th Battalion Massachusetts Volunteer Militia
- 5th Regiment Massachusetts Volunteer Militia
- 6th Regiment Massachusetts Volunteer Militia
- 7th Regiment Massachusetts Volunteer Infantry
- 8th Regiment Massachusetts Volunteer Militia
- 9th Regiment Massachusetts Volunteer Infantry
- 10th Regiment Massachusetts Volunteer Infantry
- 11th Regiment Massachusetts Volunteer Infantry
- 12th Regiment Massachusetts Volunteer Infantry
- 13th Regiment Massachusetts Volunteer Infantry
- 14th Regiment Massachusetts Volunteer Infantry
- 15th Regiment Massachusetts Volunteer Infantry
- 16th Regiment Massachusetts Volunteer Infantry
- 17th Regiment Massachusetts Volunteer Infantry
- 18th Regiment Massachusetts Volunteer Infantry
- 19th Regiment Massachusetts Volunteer Infantry
- 20th Regiment Massachusetts Volunteer Infantry
- 21st Regiment Massachusetts Volunteer Infantry
- 22nd Regiment Massachusetts Volunteer Infantry
- 23rd Regiment Massachusetts Volunteer Infantry
- 24th Regiment Massachusetts Volunteer Infantry
- 25th Regiment Massachusetts Volunteer Infantry
- 26th Regiment Massachusetts Volunteer Infantry
- 27th Regiment Massachusetts Volunteer Infantry
- 28th Regiment Massachusetts Volunteer Infantry
- 29th Regiment Massachusetts Volunteer Infantry
- 30th Regiment Massachusetts Volunteer Infantry
- 31st Regiment Massachusetts Volunteer Infantry
- 32nd Regiment Massachusetts Volunteer Infantry
- 33rd Regiment Massachusetts Volunteer Infantry
- 34th Regiment Massachusetts Volunteer Infantry
- 35th Regiment Massachusetts Volunteer Infantry
- 36th Regiment Massachusetts Volunteer Infantry
- 37th Regiment Massachusetts Volunteer Infantry
- 38th Regiment Massachusetts Volunteer Infantry
- 39th Regiment Massachusetts Volunteer Infantry
- 40th Regiment Massachusetts Volunteer Infantry
- 41st Regiment Massachusetts Volunteer Infantry
- 42nd Regiment Massachusetts Volunteer Infantry
- 43rd Regiment Massachusetts Volunteer Infantry
- 44th Regiment Massachusetts Volunteer Infantry
- 45th Regiment Massachusetts Volunteer Infantry
- 46th Regiment Massachusetts Volunteer Infantry
- 47th Regiment Massachusetts Volunteer Infantry
- 48th Regiment Massachusetts Volunteer Infantry
- 49th Regiment Massachusetts Volunteer Infantry
- 50th Regiment Massachusetts Volunteer Infantry
- 51st Regiment Massachusetts Volunteer Infantry
- 52nd Regiment Massachusetts Volunteer Infantry
- 53rd Regiment Massachusetts Volunteer Infantry
- 54th Regiment Massachusetts Volunteer Infantry - African-American
- 55th Regiment Massachusetts Volunteer Infantry - African-American
- 56th Regiment Massachusetts Volunteer Infantry
- 57th Regiment Massachusetts Volunteer Infantry
- 58th Regiment Massachusetts Volunteer Infantry
- 59th Regiment Massachusetts Volunteer Infantry
- 60th Regiment Massachusetts Volunteer Infantry
- 61st Regiment Massachusetts Volunteer Infantry
- 62nd Regiment Massachusetts Volunteer Infantry
- Unattached Companies Massachusetts Volunteer Militia
- Boston Cadets
- Salem Cadets

=== Sharpshooters ===
- 1st Company Massachusetts Sharpshooters
- 2nd Company Massachusetts Sharpshooters

== Cavalry ==
- 1st Regiment Massachusetts Volunteer Cavalry
- 2nd Regiment Massachusetts Volunteer Cavalry
- 2nd Battalion Massachusetts Volunteer Cavalry
- 3rd Regiment Massachusetts Volunteer Cavalry
- 4th Regiment Massachusetts Volunteer Cavalry
- 5th Regiment Massachusetts Volunteer Cavalry - African-American
- Devins' Battalion Mounted Infantry
- Independent Battalion of Cavalry

== Artillery ==
=== Light Artillery ===
- 1st Battery, Massachusetts Volunteer Light Artillery
- 2nd Battery, Massachusetts Volunteer Light Artillery
- 3rd Battery, Massachusetts Volunteer Light Artillery
- 4th Battery, Massachusetts Volunteer Light Artillery
- 5th Battery, Massachusetts Volunteer Light Artillery
- 6th Battery, Massachusetts Volunteer Light Artillery
- 7th Battery, Massachusetts Volunteer Light Artillery
- 8th Battery, Massachusetts Volunteer Light Artillery
- 9th Battery, Massachusetts Volunteer Light Artillery
- 10th Battery, Massachusetts Volunteer Light Artillery
- 11th Battery, Massachusetts Volunteer Light Artillery
- 12th Battery, Massachusetts Volunteer Light Artillery
- 13th Battery, Massachusetts Volunteer Light Artillery
- 14th Battery, Massachusetts Volunteer Light Artillery
- 15th Battery, Massachusetts Volunteer Light Artillery
- 16th Battery, Massachusetts Volunteer Light Artillery

=== Heavy Artillery ===
- 1st Battalion Massachusetts Volunteer Heavy Artillery
- 1st Regiment Massachusetts Volunteer Heavy Artillery
- 2nd Regiment Massachusetts Volunteer Heavy Artillery
- 3rd Regiment Massachusetts Volunteer Heavy Artillery
- 4th Regiment Massachusetts Volunteer Heavy Artillery
- 1st, 2nd, 4th and 5th Unattached Companies (see: 1st Battalion Massachusetts Heavy Artillery)
- 3rd, 6th to 16th Unattached Companies (see: 3rd Massachusetts Heavy Artillery)
- 17th to 28th Unattached Companies (see:4th Massachusetts Heavy Artillery)
- 29th Company, Unattached Massachusetts Volunteer Heavy Artillery
- 30th Company, Unattached Massachusetts Volunteer Heavy Artillery

== See also ==
- Lists of American Civil War Regiments by State
