= Camp Chase (Massachusetts) =

Civil War training camp

Coordinates: 42.620°N 71.311°W

Camp Chase, also known as Camp Wilson, was a training camp for Massachusetts militia during the American Civil War located in Lowell, Massachusetts. Several thousand recruits were trained at Camp Chase before being sent south to the battle front.

In 1860, the Middlesex North Agricultural Society purchased land south of the center of Lowell from the Boston & Lowell Railroad Company for a fairground. Before the war began, the fairground was frequently used for musters and drills of Massachusetts militia units under the command of Major General Benjamin Butler, a prominent attorney of Lowell and Massachusetts militia officer. When the war began, Butler played a large role in creating a more permanent camp on this location.

At least eleven units were trained at Camp Chase during its two years of operation from 1861 to 1863. These included the 26th, 30th, and 31st Massachusetts regiments of infantry, the 2nd Massachusetts Battalion of Cavalry, the 3rd Massachusetts Cavalry Regiment, and the 4th, 6th, 7th and 15th Massachusetts Batteries of Light Artillery. Units from other states were also trained at Camp Chase including the 11th Maine Infantry, the 12th Maine Infantry, and the 9th Connecticut Infantry Regiment.

After the war, the military camp was discontinued and the site returned to use as an agricultural fair ground. The fair ground ceased operation in 1906.

== See also ==
- List of military installations in Massachusetts
