= Camp Adams =

Coordinates: 42.26°N 71.019°W

Camp Adams was an American Civil War training camp that existed in 1861 in Quincy, Massachusetts. It was first occupied on 5 July 1861 by Cobb's Light Artillery. On 8 August the unit relocated to Baltimore, Maryland and established Camp Andrew.

== See also ==
- List of military installations in Massachusetts
