= 36th Massachusetts Infantry Regiment =

36th Massachusetts Volunteer Infantry
- Active: August 1, 1862 - June 21, 1865
- Country: United States of America
- Allegiance: Union
- Branch: Infantry
- Engagements: Battle of Fredericksburg; Siege of Vicksburg; Siege of Jackson; Knoxville Campaign; Rapidan Campaign; Battle of the Wilderness; Battle of Spotsylvania Court House; Battle of North Anna; Battle of Totopotomoy Creek; Battle of Cold Harbor; Siege of Petersburg; Battle of the Crater; Battle of Globe Tavern; Battle of Boydton Plank Road; Appomattox Campaign; Third Battle of Petersburg

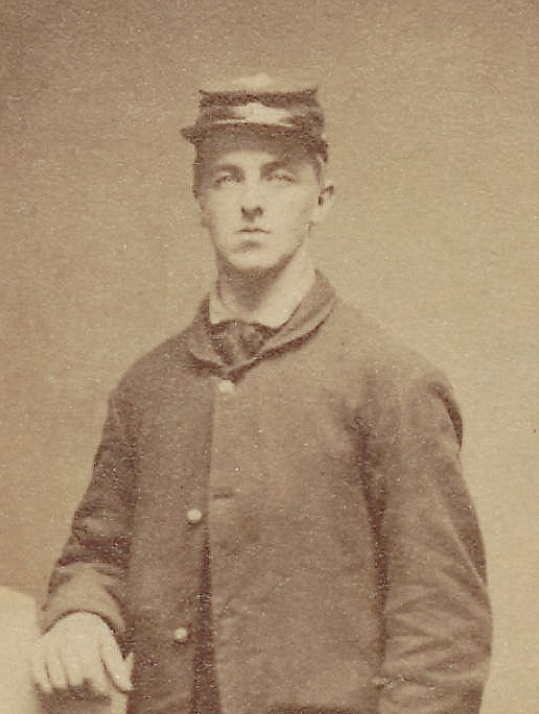
Private Francis "Frank" W. Knowles of the 36th Massachusetts

The 36th Regiment Massachusetts Volunteer Infantry was an infantry regiment that served in the Union Army during the American Civil War.

== Service ==
The 36th Massachusetts Infantry was organized at Worcester, Massachusetts and mustered in August 30, 1862 for a three-year enlistment under the command of Colonel Henry Bowman.

The regiment was attached to 3rd Brigade, 1st Division, IX Corps, Army of the Potomac, to April 1863, and Department of the Ohio, to June 1863. 1st Brigade, 1st Division, IX Corps, Department of the Ohio, and Army of the Tennessee, to August 1863, and Department of the Ohio, to April 1864. 1st Brigade, 2nd Division, IX Corps, Army of the Potomac, to June 1865.

The 36th Massachusetts Infantry mustered out of service on June 8, 1865 and was discharged June 21, 1865.

== Detailed service ==
Left Massachusetts for Washington, D.C., September 2, then moved to Leesburg, Md., September 9, and to Pleasant Valley. Duty at Pleasant Valley, Md., until October 26. March to Lovettsville, Va., October 26–29, and to Warrenton October 29-November 19. Battle of Fredericksburg, Va., December 12–15. "Mud March" January 20–24, 1863. Moved to Newport News, Va., February 10, then to Lexington, Ky., March 19–23. Duty at Camp Dick Robinson, Ky., April 9–30, and at Middleburg until May 23. Marched to Columbia May 23–26. Expedition toward Cumberland River after Morgan May 27–30. Jamestown June 2. Moved to Vicksburg, Miss., June 7–14. Siege of Vicksburg, Miss., June 14-July 4. Advance on Jackson, Miss., July 5–10. Siege of Jackson July 10–17. At Milldale until August 5. Moved to Covington, Ky., August 5–12, and to Crab Orchard August 17–18. Marched across Cumberland Mountains to eastern Tennessee September 10–22. Near Knoxville September 27-October 3. Action at Blue Springs October 10. At Lenoir October 29-November 14. Knoxville Campaign November–December. Lenoir Station November 14–15. Campbell's Station November 17. Siege of Knoxville November 17-December 4. Pursuit of Longstreet December 5–19. Operations in eastern Tennessee until March 21, 1864. Strawberry Plains January 21–22. Moved from Knoxville, Tenn., to Covington, Ky., then to Annapolis, Md., March 21-April 6. Rapidan Campaign May–June. Battle of the Wilderness May 5–7. Battle of Spotsylvania May 8–12. Battle of Spottsylvania Court House May 12–21. Assault on the Salient May 12. Stannard's Mills May 21. North Anna River May 23–26. On line of the Pamunkey May 26–28. Totopotomoy May 28–31. Cold Harbor June 1–12. Bethesda Church June 1–3. Before Petersburg June 16–18. Siege of Petersburg June 16, 1864 to April 2, 1865. Mine Explosion, Petersburg, July 30, 1864. Weldon Railroad August 18–21. Poplar Springs Church September 29-October 2. Boydton Plank Road, Hatcher's Run, October 27–28. At Fort Rice until April 1865. Appomattox Campaign March 28-April 9. Assault on and fall of Petersburg April 2. Marched to Farmville April 3–9. Moved to Petersburg and City Point, then to Alexandria April 20–28. Grand Review of the Armies May 23.

== Casualties ==
The regiment lost a total of 274 men during service; 6 officers and 105 enlisted men killed or mortally wounded, 3 officers and 160 enlisted men died of disease.

== Commanders ==
- Colonel Henry Bowman
- Lieutenant Colonel Joseph H. Barnes - commanded during the Siege of Vicksburg
- Lieutenant Colonel Thaddeus L. Barker - commanded at the Battle of the Crater while still at the rank of captain
- Major Henry Draper - commanded during the Knoxville Campaign
- Major William F. Draper - commanded during the Battle of the Wilderness

== See also ==
- List of Massachusetts Civil War Units
- Massachusetts in the American Civil War
