= 43rd Massachusetts Infantry Regiment =

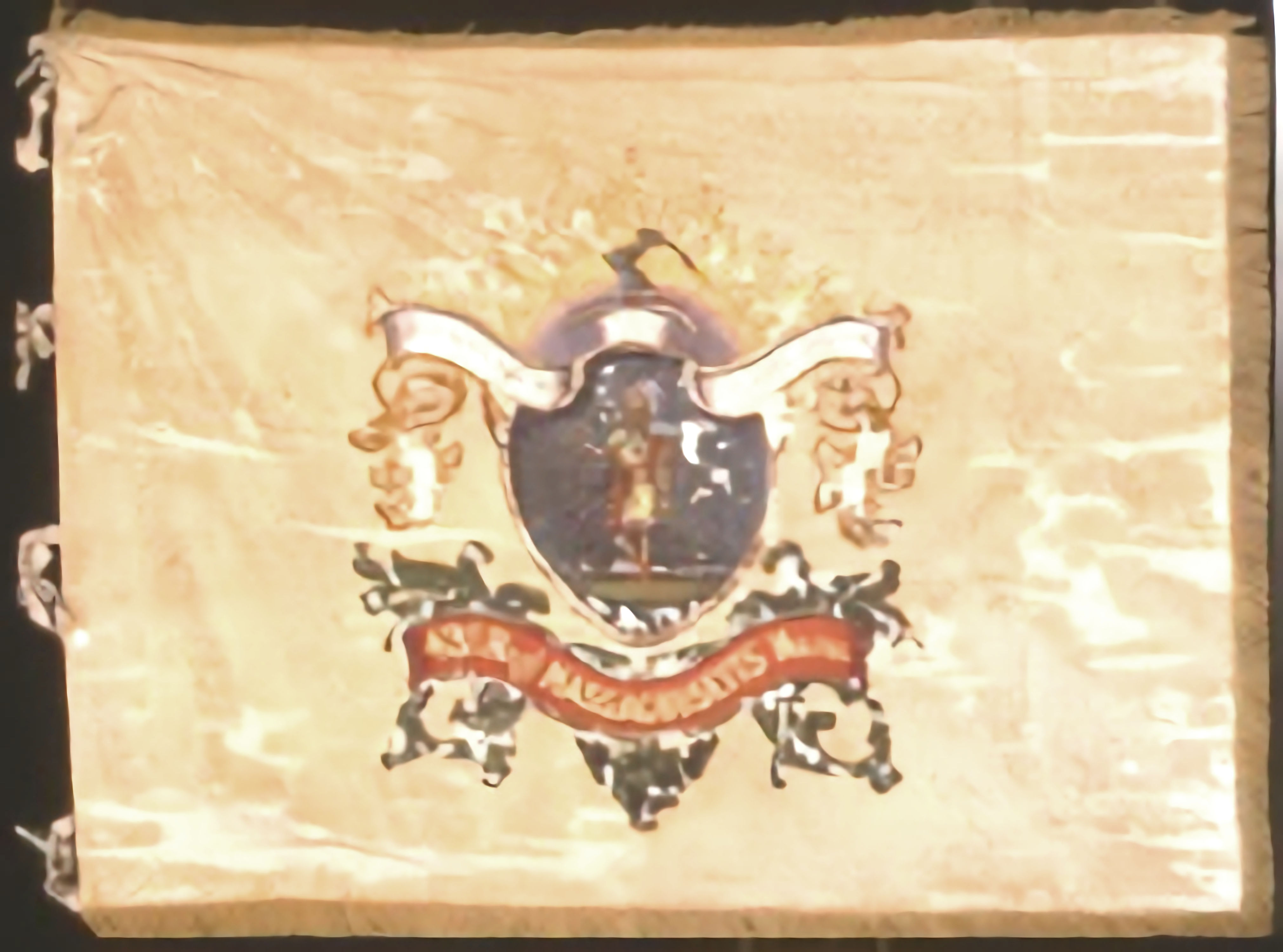
- Regimental Color of the 43rd Massachusetts
- Active: 1862–1863
- Disbanded: July 30, 1863
- Country: United States
- Allegiance: Massachusetts
- Branch: Volunteers
- Type: Infantry
- Size: Regiment
- Part of: 1st Brigade, 1st Division, XVIII Corps (1863)
- Nickname: Tiger Regiment
- Engagements: American Civil War

Commanders
- Colonel: Charles L. Holbrook

Insignia
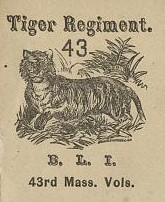
- Regimental insignia

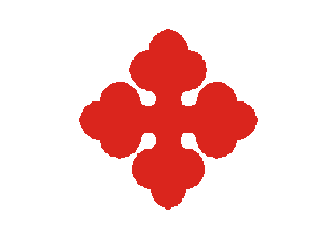
- XVIII Corps, 1st Division badge

The 43rd Regiment Massachusetts Volunteer Infantry was an infantry formation that served in the Union Army during the American Civil War.

== History ==
Camp Rogers. Encampment of the 43d Regiment Mass. Vols., Newbern, N. C., March 12, 1863.

The regiment was formed in September 1862 in response to President Abraham Lincoln's call for 300,000 men to serve for nine months. The nucleus of the regiment was the Second Battalion Massachusetts Volunteer Militia, a unit dating to 1798 known as the Boston Light Infantry and nicknamed the "Tigers." The 43rd Massachusetts therefore became known as the "Tiger Regiment."

The regiment trained at Camp Meigs in Readville, Massachusetts just outside of Boston. They departed Massachusetts on October 24, assigned to Maj. Gen. John G. Foster's Department of North Carolina, later designated as the XVIII Corps. The regiment was stationed in New Bern, North Carolina at Camp Rogers. In December, the regiment took part in the Goldsborough Expedition. The objective of this maneuver was to disrupt the Confederate supply line along the Wilmington and Weldon Railroad by destroying the Goldsborough Bridge. During this expedition, was lightly engaged in the Battles of Kinston, White Hall and Goldsborough Bridge.

While based in New Bern, the 43rd Massachusetts participated in patrols and reconnaissance expeditions. The unit returned to Boston in July 1863 and was mustered out on July 30, 1863. The regiment lost two men killed in action and 12 by disease.

== See also ==
- List of Massachusetts Civil War units
