= 12th Massachusetts Battery =

- Active: December 8, 1862 – July 25, 1865
- Country: United States
- Branch: Union Army
- Type: Field artillery
- Size: Battery
- Part of: In 1863: Artillery Reserve, XIX Corps
- Engagements: American Civil War

Commanders
- Current commander: Captain Jacob Miller

The 12th Massachusetts Battery (or 12th Battery Massachusetts Light Artillery) was an artillery battery that served in the Union Army during the American Civil War. The unit was organized at Camp Meigs near Boston during the fall of 1862. Its members were mustered in at various times over the fall and the officers mustered into federal service on December 8, 1862. It was assigned to the Department of the Gulf under Major General Nathaniel P. Banks and departed Massachusetts by steamship on January 3, 1863.

After a difficult voyage due to storms, the battery arrived in New Orleans a month later on February 3. For the next several months, the battery was posted in New Orleans and for a time in Baton Rouge, taking a position in the defenses of that city during March. For a short time in April, they were mounted and outfitted as cavalry. On April 17, the battery, without their guns, moved to Brashear City, Louisiana acting as infantry in defending transports moving to and from that city during the First Bayou Teche Campaign. They returned to New Orleans on May 23, were resupplied with guns and were posted again as light artillery in the city defenses until October. During June and July 1863, two sections (consisting of four guns and roughly two-thirds of the enlisted men) took part in the Siege of Port Hudson though not heavily engaged. After the Confederates surrendered Port Hudson on July 9, the sections returned to New Orleans and the battery was reunited. On October 15, the 12th Massachusetts battery moved to Port Hudson and would remain there on garrison duty until the end of their service. Their duty in Port Hudson and the vicinity during 1864 and 1865 was light, consisting mostly of foraging expeditions and reconnaissances.

After the close of the war, the unit returned to Massachusetts in July 1865 and was mustered out on July 25. The unit lost 25 men due to disease.

== See also ==
- Massachusetts in the Civil War
- List of Massachusetts Civil War units
