= Salem Cadets =

- Active: May 26 – October 11, 1862
- Disbanded: October 11, 1862
- Country: United States
- Allegiance: Union
- Size: 130
- Garrison/HQ: Fort Warren, Boston
- Engagements: American Civil War

Commanders
- Major: John L. Marks
- Captain: Joseph A. Dalton
- First Lieutenant: Richard Skinner Jr.
- Adjutant: John Pickering Jr.
- Second Lieutenant: Joseph C. Foster; Thomas II. Johnson; Jonathan A. Kenney

The Salem Cadets were from Salem, Massachusetts that served in the Union Army between May 26 and October 11, 1862, during the American Civil War. The unit consisted of 123 enlisted men under the command of Major John L. Marks, and six other officers. Their only duty was to serve at Fort Warren, Boston Harbor. They lost one soldier to disease and was mustered out on October 11, 1862.

== Bibliography ==
- Adjutant-General (1868). Massachusetts Volunteers. Wright & Potter State Printers, Boston, Massachusetts.
- Osborn, Francis Augustus (2004). Civil War Regiments From Massachusetts. eBookOnDisk.com Pensacola, Florida. ISBN 1-932157-21-2.
