= Readville, Boston =

Neighborhood in Boston, Massachusetts

Coordinates: 42°14′25″N 71°08′13″W

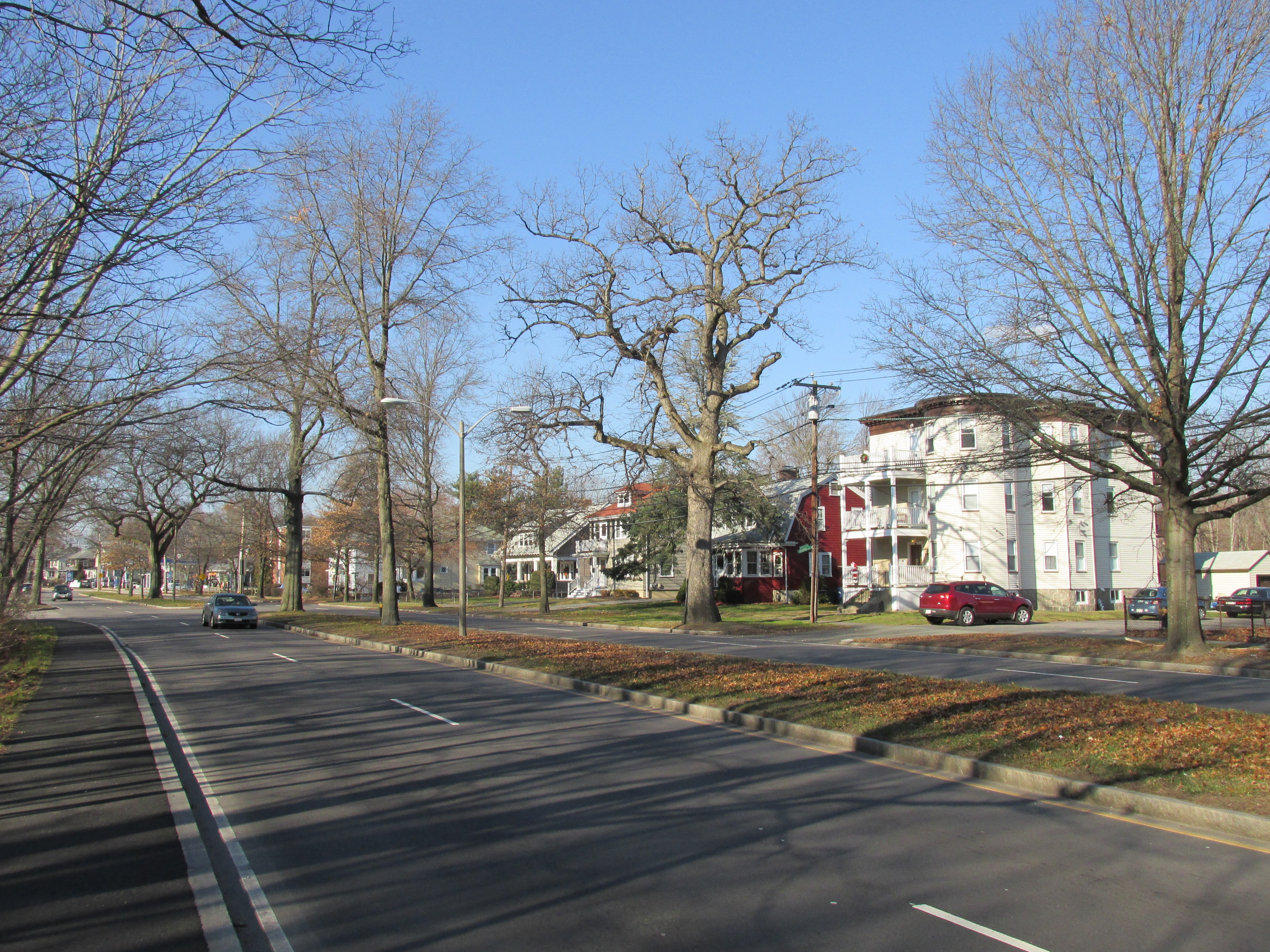
Neponset Valley Parkway

Readville is part of the Hyde Park neighborhood of Boston. Readville's ZIP Code is 02136. It was called Dedham Low Plains from 1655 until it was renamed after James Read, the owner of the Dedham Manufacturing Company along Mother Brook, in 1847. It was part of Dedham until 1867, at which point it became part of the independent town of Hyde Park.

It is served by Readville station on the MBTA Commuter Rail. It is on the original alignment of Route 128, later part of a since-discontinued section of Route 135. Readville is bordered by the Town of Milton to the south and the Town of Dedham to the west. Paul's Bridge, which is at the neighborhood's entrance as one approaches Milton, is one of the oldest bridges in the Commonwealth. The name comes from James Read, a resident and cotton mill owner. Readville is covered by Boston Police Department District E-18 in Hyde Park and a fire station on Neponset Valley Parkway houses Boston Engine Company 49. Readville is also home to several light industries.

Readville was home to Camp Meigs during the American Civil War, a training camp for Union soldiers, including those of the famed 54th Massachusetts Infantry, portrayed in the film Glory. Another notable regiment that trained at Camp Meigs was the 2nd Massachusetts Cavalry, half of which was recruited in California and sent by sea to Readville for training before being sent to Virginia to the war. There are plaques and small monuments commemorating this history at what is now called Meigs Field. Also established in 1861 was Camp Massasoit.

The neighborhood was an Irish-American and Italian-American stronghold through much of the 20th century but is now home to many African-American and Hispanic and Latino residents.

The Blue Hill Community Church is a non-denominational church founded in 1888. At BHCC, Phillips Brooks preached his last sermon and his Christmas Carol "O Little Town of Bethlehem" had its first performance. Samuel Francis Smith first read his poem "America" at BHCC; it was later set to music and became known as "My Country Tis of Thee." St. Anne's Roman Catholic Church serves as the local parish. Former Boston Mayor Thomas Menino and Massachusetts State Representative Angelo Scaccia are both longtime Readville residents.

In the early part of the 20th century, a prominent harness racing facility called Readville Trotting Park was located in the neighborhood. That property later became a Stop & Shop warehouse and distribution center and is now a multi-use warehouse property. Readville has excellent views of Great Blue Hill and the Blue Hills Reservation and has a wetlands area known as Fowl Meadow. The Neponset River is another natural feature.

Readville was also home to the massive New York, New Haven & Hartford Railroad Locomotive and Car Shops, which closed in 1960. Today, the CSX Railroad operates a portion of the Readville Freight Yard along Prescott Street .The MBTA Commuter Rail has a passenger car facility for light maintenance and servicing just outside Wolcott Square. Amtrak's Northeast Corridor runs through Readville on trackage shared with MBTA Commuter and CSX freight operations.

== James Read ==
Read was one of 10 children of a Cambridge saddler and part-time postmaster. He left school at 14 and was apprenticed to a dry goods merchant. He started James Read and Company and was able to purchased a Charles Bulfinch-designed home in the Tontine Crescent. He was the part-owner and selling agent for five cotton mills in Massachusetts. He also founded the Boston Manufacturers Mutual Fire Insurance Company.

== Works cited ==
- Neiswander, Judith (2024). Mother Brook and the Mills of East Dedham. Damianos Publishing. ISBN 978-1-941573-66-2.
