= Massachusetts in the American Civil War =

The Commonwealth of Massachusetts played a significant role in national events prior to and during the American Civil War (1861–1865). Massachusetts Republicans dominated the early antislavery movement during the 1830s, motivating activists across the nation. This, in turn, increased sectionalism in the North and South, one of the factors that led to the war. Politicians from Massachusetts, echoing the views of social activists, further increased national tensions. The state was dominated by the Republican Party and was also home to many Republican leaders who promoted harsh treatment of slave owners and, later, the former civilian leaders of the Confederate States of America and the military officers in the Confederate Army.

Once hostilities began, Massachusetts supported the war effort in several significant ways, sending 159,165 men to serve in the Union Army and the Union Navy for the loyal North. One of the best known Massachusetts units was the 54th Massachusetts Volunteer Infantry, the first regiment of African American soldiers (led by white officers). Additionally, a number of important generals came from Massachusetts, including Benjamin F. Butler, Joseph Hooker, who commanded the Federal Army of the Potomac in early 1863, as well as Edwin V. Sumner and Darius N. Couch, who both successively commanded the II Corps of the Union Army.

In terms of war materiel, Massachusetts, as a leading center of industry and manufacturing, was poised to become a major producer of munitions and supplies. The most important source of armaments in Massachusetts was the Springfield Armory of the United States Department of War.

The state also made important contributions to relief efforts. Many leaders of nursing and soldiers' aid organizations hailed from Massachusetts, including Dorothea Dix, founder of the Army Nurses Bureau, the Rev. Henry Whitney Bellows, founder of the United States Sanitary Commission, and independent nurse Clara Barton, future founder of the American Red Cross.

== Antebellum and wartime politics ==
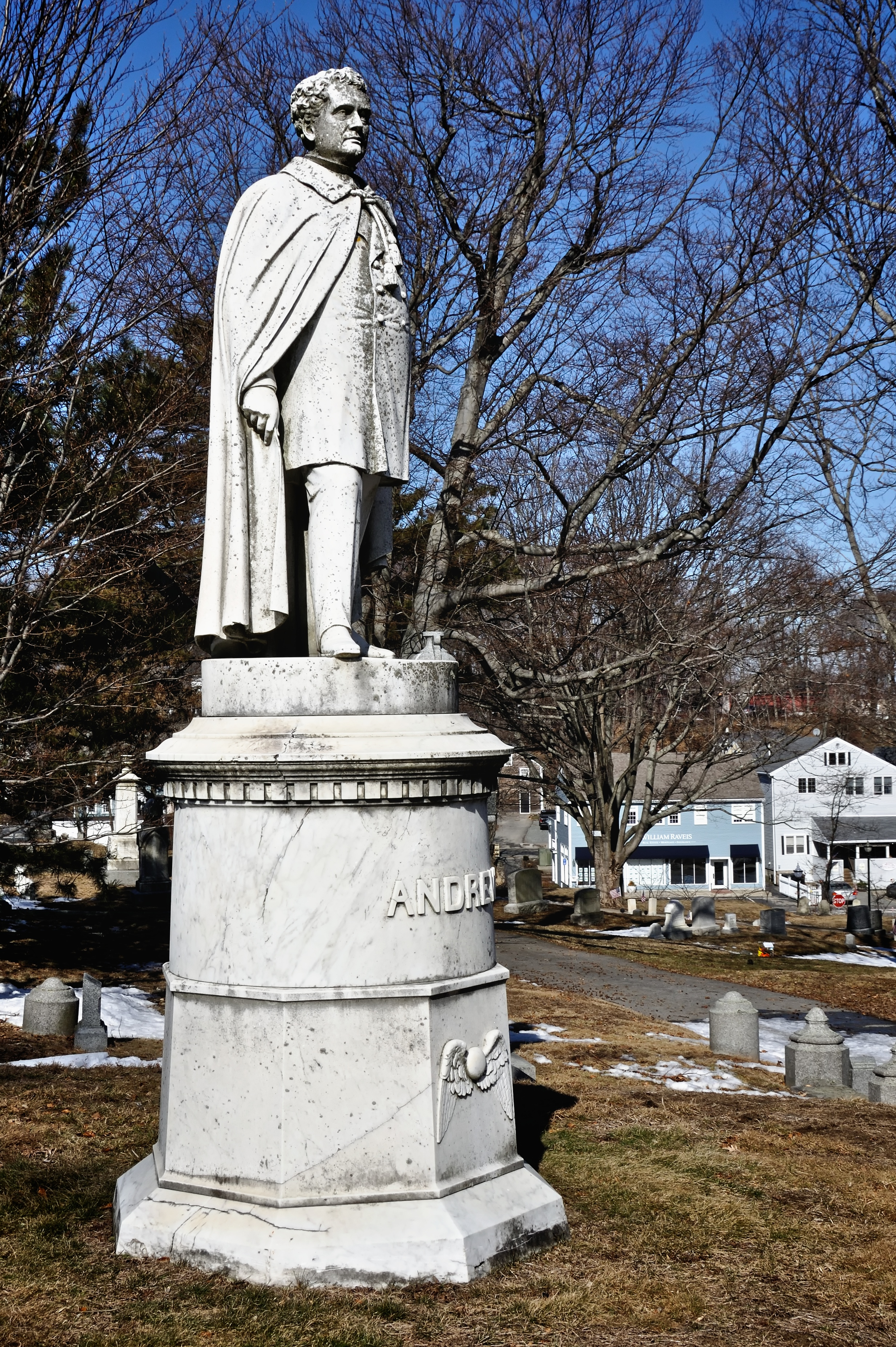
Statue marking the burial plot of John Albion Andrew, Governor of Massachusetts during the war, Old Ship Burying Ground, Hingham

Massachusetts played a major role in the causes of the American Civil War, particularly with regard to the political ramifications of the antislavery abolitionist movement. Antislavery activists in Massachusetts sought to influence public opinion and applied moral and political pressure on the United States Congress to abolish slavery. William Lloyd Garrison (1805–1879), of Boston began publishing the antislavery newspaper The Liberator and founded the New England Anti-Slavery Society in 1831, becoming one of the nation's most influential editors and abolitionists. Garrison and his uncompromising rhetoric provoked a backlash both in the North and South and escalated regional tension prior to the war.

By the late 1850s, the antislavery Republican Party became the dominant political organization in several northeastern states. Prominent Republican leaders from Massachusetts included U.S. Senators Charles Sumner and Henry Wilson who espoused Garrison's views and further increased sectionalism. In 1856, Sumner delivered a scathing speech in the United States Senate at the criticizing and insulting pro-slavery southern Democrat politicians. This prompted Representative Preston Brooks of South Carolina to later attack Senator Sumner on the Senate floor, severely beating him over the head and shoulders with a cane. Sumner was so severely injured that he did not return to his Senate duties for several months. The incident further heightened sectional tensions.

By 1860, the Republicans controlled the Governor's office and the state legislature. During the 1860 presidential election, 63 percent of Massachusetts voters supported Abraham Lincoln and the Republican Party, 20 percent supported Stephen Douglas of the Northern wing of the Democratic Party, 13 percent supported John Bell and the temporary third party Constitutional Union Party, and 4 percent supported John C. Breckinridge and the Southern Democrats. Support for the Republican Party increased during the war years, with 72 percent voting for Lincoln for reelection in the Election of 1864.

The dominant political figure in Massachusetts during the war was Governor John Albion Andrew, a staunch Republican who energetically supported the war effort. Massachusetts annually re-elected him by large margins for the duration of the war—his smallest margin of victory occurred in 1860 for his first election, with 61 percent of the popular vote, and his largest in 1863, with 71 percent.

== Recruitment ==
Massachusetts sent a total of 159,165 men to serve in the war. Of these, 133,002 served in the Union army and 26,163 served in the navy. The army units raised in Massachusetts consisted of 62 regiments of infantry, six regiments of cavalry, 16 batteries of light artillery, four regiments of heavy artillery, two companies of sharpshooters, a handful of unattached battalions and 26 unattached companies.

=== Minutemen of '61 ===
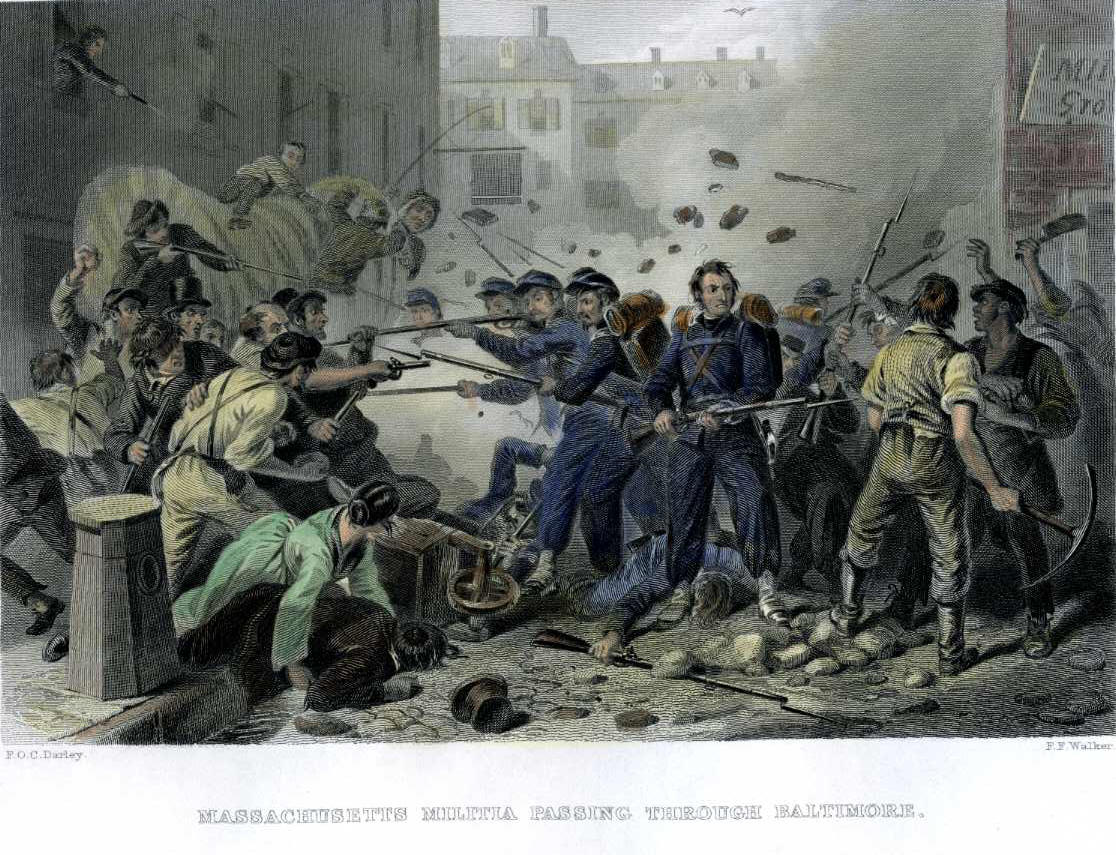
The 6th Massachusetts assaulted in Baltimore, April 19, 1861

Governor Andrew took office in January 1861, just two weeks after the secession of South Carolina. Convinced that war was imminent, Andrew took rapid measures to prepare the state militia for active duty. On April 15, 1861, Andrew received a telegraph from Washington calling for 1,500 men from Massachusetts to serve for ninety days. The next day, several companies of the 8th Massachusetts Volunteer Militia from Marblehead, Massachusetts were the first to report in Boston; by the end of the day, three regiments were ready to start for Washington.

While passing through Baltimore on April 19, 1861, the 6th Massachusetts was attacked by a pro-secession mob and became the first volunteer troops to suffer casualties in the war. The 6th Massachusetts was also the first volunteer regiment to reach Washington, D.C., in response to Lincoln's call for troops. Lincoln awaited the arrival of additional regiments, but none arrived for several days. Inspecting the 6th Massachusetts on April 24, Lincoln told the soldiers, "I don't believe there is any North...You are the only Northern realities."

Given that the 6th Massachusetts reached Washington on April 19 (the anniversary of the Battles of Lexington and Concord, which commenced the American Revolutionary War) and other Massachusetts regiments were en route to Washington and Virginia on that date, the first militia units to leave Massachusetts were dubbed, "The Minutemen of '61".

=== Recruiting the three-year regiments ===
As the initial rush of enthusiasm subsided, the state government faced the ongoing task of recruiting tens of thousands of soldiers to fill federal quotas. The great majority of these troops were required to serve for three years. Recruiting offices were opened in virtually every town and, over the course of 1861, recruits from Massachusetts surpassed the quotas. However, by the summer of 1862, recruiting had slowed considerably. On July 7, 1862, Andrew instituted a system whereby recruitment quotas were issued to every city and town in proportion to their population. This motivated local leaders, increasing enlistment.

=== 28th Massachusetts Infantry ===
The 28th Massachusetts Infantry Regiment was well known as the fourth regiment of the famed Irish Brigade, commanded by Brig. Gen. Thomas Francis Meagher. It was the second primarily Irish American volunteer infantry regiment recruited in Massachusetts for service in the American Civil War (the first being the 9th Massachusetts). The regiment's motto (or battle-cry) was Faugh a Ballagh (Clear the Way!). The men of the 28th Massachusetts saw action in most of the Union Army's major eastern theater engagements, including Antietam, Fredericksburg, Chancellorsville, Gettysburg, the Overland Campaign, and the Siege of Petersburg. The regiment was present for Gen. Robert E. Lee's surrender to Gen. Ulysses S. Grant at Appomattox Court House.

=== 54th Massachusetts Infantry ===
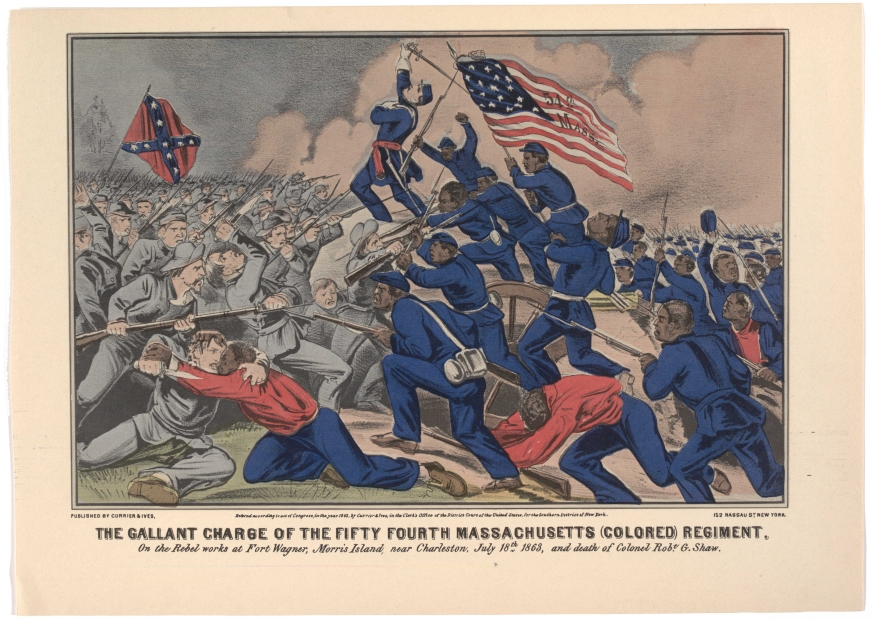
54th Massachusetts (Colored) Infantry

One of the best-known regiments formed in Massachusetts was the 54th Massachusetts Infantry, the first regiment in the Union army consisting of African-American soldiers. It was commanded by white officers. With the Emancipation Proclamation in effect as of January 1, 1863, Andrew saw the opportunity for Massachusetts to lead the way in recruiting African-American soldiers. After securing permission from President Lincoln, Andrew, black abolitionist Frederick Douglass and others recruited two regiments of African American soldiers, the 54th and the 55th Massachusetts Infantries.

The 54th, because it was the first such regiment, attracted tremendous publicity during its formation. To ensure the success of the experiment, Andrew solicited donations and political support from many of Boston's elite families. He gained the endorsement of Boston's elite by offering the regiment's command to Robert Gould Shaw, son of prominent Bostonians. The 54th Massachusetts won fame in their assault on Battery Wagner on Morris Island in Charleston Harbor, during which Col. Shaw was killed. The story of the 54th Massachusetts was the basis for the 1989 film Glory.

=== General officers ===
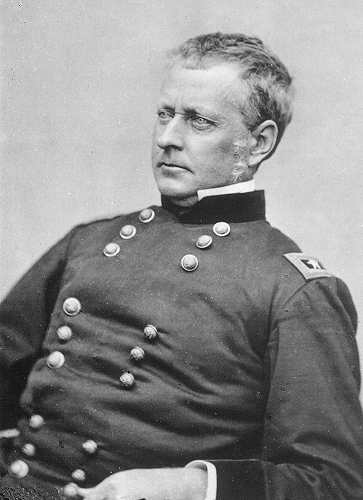
Maj. Gen. Joseph Hooker from Hadley, Massachusetts

Generals from Massachusetts commanded several army departments, and included a commander of the Army of the Potomac as well as a number of army corps commanders.

One of the most prominent generals from Massachusetts was Maj. Gen. Joseph Hooker. Born in Hadley, Massachusetts and a graduate from the United States Military Academy at West Point, he served in the Regular Army during the Mexican–American War. During the war, he was awarded three brevet promotions for meritorious actions. While posted in California, he was court martialed in December 1851 for profiteering from the army. He resigned his commission on February 21, 1853, and started life as a farmer in Sonoma Valley, California. At the outbreak of the Civil War, he was commissioned brigadier general and steadily rose from brigade commander, to division commander, to commander of the I Corps, which he led during the Battle of Antietam. Following that battle, he was placed in command of the V Corps and then the Center Grand Division of the Army of the Potomac, consisting of the III and V Corps. On January 26, 1863, he was promoted to command of the Army of the Potomac. Although he was successful at reviving the esprit de corps of his army by better distributing supplies and food, he was unable to effectively lead the army in the field, and his inaction during the Battle of Chancellorsville led to his resignation of his command. Transferred to the Department of the Cumberland, he commanded the XI and XII Corps during several western campaigns and distinguished himself during the Battle of Lookout Mountain. Hooker resigned his command upon the promotion of Maj. Gen. Oliver O. Howard to the command of the Army of the Tennessee, a post to which Hooker felt entitled. Hooker served the remainder of the war in an administrative role, overseeing the Department of the North (consisting of army fortifications and troops stationed in Michigan, Ohio, Indiana and Illinois) and the Department of the East (which encompassed installations and troops in New England, New York and New Jersey).

Maj. Gen. Nathaniel P. Banks, former governor of Massachusetts, was among the first men appointed major general of volunteers by President Lincoln. In July 1861, Banks came to command the Department of the Shenandoah. In May 1862, he was completely out-generaled by Stonewall Jackson and forced to abandon the Shenandoah Valley. He then commanded the II Corps during the Northern Virginia Campaign and was eventually transferred to command of the Department of the Gulf, coordinating military efforts in Louisiana and Texas. In this capacity, Banks led the successful and strategically important Siege of Port Hudson in the summer of 1863, but also the disastrous Red River Campaign in the spring of 1864, which he commanded under protest. The campaign ended his military career in the field.

Another significant general from Massachusetts, Maj. Gen. Edwin Vose Sumner, born in 1797, was the oldest general officer with a field command on either side of the war. He had served in the Regular Army during the Mexican-American war and numerous campaigns in the West. Sumner commanded the II Corps during the Maryland Campaign and later the Right Grand Division of the Army of the Potomac during the Fredericksburg Campaign. Following the Battle of Fredericksburg, he resigned his command in January 1863 and was to be transferred to command the Department of the Missouri, but died of a heart attack en route on March 21, 1863.

Other important generals from Massachusetts included Maj. Gen. Darius Couch, who commanded the II Corps and the Department of the Susquehanna, Maj. Gen. John G. Barnard, who organized the defenses of Washington, DC and became Chief Engineer of the Union Armies in the field, and Maj. Gen. Isaac Stevens, who had graduated first in his class at West Point and commanded a division of the IX Corps.

== War materiel ==
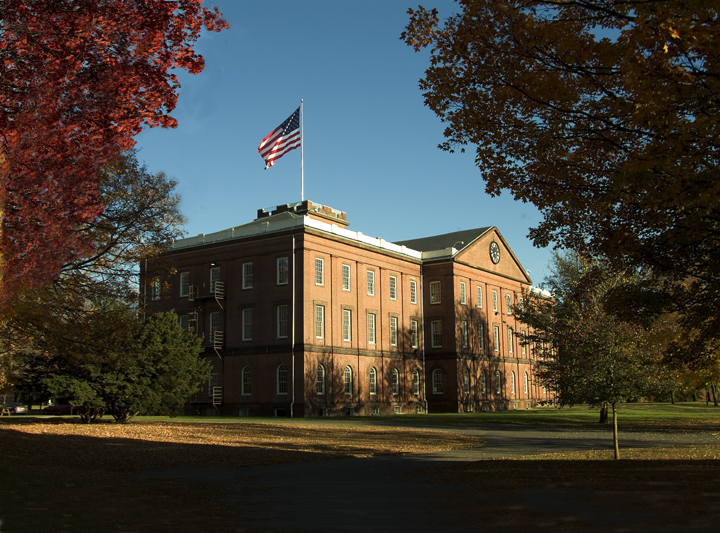
The Springfield Armory, established in 1794

The advanced state of industrialization in the North, as compared with the Confederate states, was a major factor in the victory of Union armies. Massachusetts, and the Springfield Armory in particular, played a pivotal role as a supplier of weapons and equipment for the Union army.

At the start of the war, the Springfield Armory was one of only two federal armories in the country, the other being the Harpers Ferry Armory. After the attack on Fort Sumter and the commencement of hostilities, Governor Andrew wrote Secretary of War Simon Cameron, urging him to discontinue the Harpers Ferry Armory (which was at that time on Confederate soil) and to channel all available federal funds towards enhancing production at the Springfield Armory. The armory produced the primary weapon of the Union infantry during the war—the Springfield rifled musket. By the end of the war, nearly 1.5 million had been produced by the armory and its numerous contractors across the country.

Another key source of war materiel was the Watertown Arsenal, which produced ammunition, gun carriages and leather military accouterments. Private companies such as Smith & Wesson enjoyed significant U.S. government contracts. The Ames Manufacturing Company of Chicopee became one of the nation's leading suppliers of swords, side arms, and cannons, and the third largest supplier of heavy ordnance.

Although Massachusetts was a major center of shipbuilding prior to the war, many of the established shipbuilding firms were slow to adapt to new technology. The few Massachusetts shipbuilders who received government contracts for the construction of iron-clad, steam powered warships were those who had invested in iron and machine technology before the war. These included the City Point Works, managed by Harrison Loring, and the Atlantic Iron Works, managed by Nelson Curtis, two Boston companies that produced Passaic class monitors during the war. The Boston Navy Yard also produced several smaller gunboats.

== Relief organizations ==
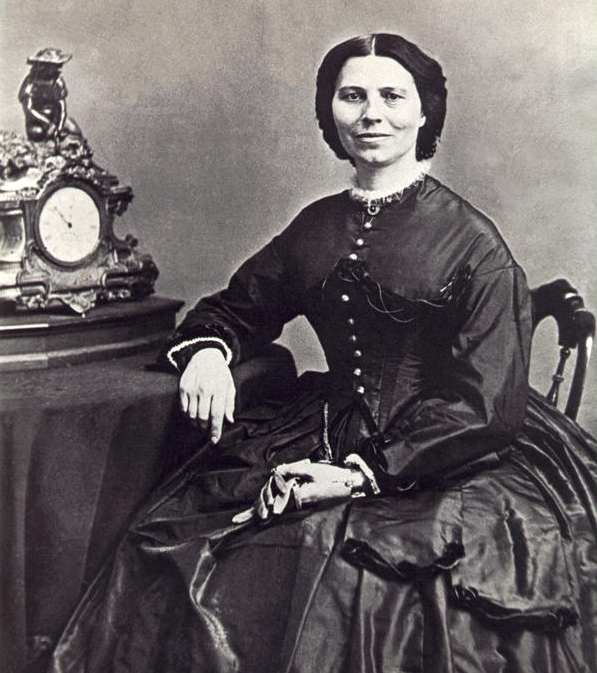
Clara Barton was an independent battlefield nurse who earned the nickname, "The Angel of the Battlefield".

Several instrumental leaders of soldiers' aid and relief organizations came from Massachusetts. These included Dorothea Dix, who had traveled across the nation working to promote proper care for the poor and insane before the war. After the outbreak of the war, she convinced the U.S. Army to establish a Women's Nursing Bureau on April 23, 1861, and became the first woman to head a federal government bureau. Although army officials were dubious about the use of female nurses, Dix proceeded to recruit many women who had previously been serving as unorganized volunteers. One of her greatest challenges, given the biases of the era, was to demonstrate that women could serve as competently as men in army hospitals. Dix had a reputation for rejecting nurses who were too young or attractive, believing that patients and surgeons alike would not take them seriously. U.S. Army surgeons often resented the nurses of Dix's bureau, claiming that they were obstinate and did not follow military protocol. Despite such obstacles, Dix was successful at placing female nurses in hospitals throughout the North.

Henry Whitney Bellows determined to take a different approach, establishing a civilian organization of nurses separate from the U.S. Army. Bellows was the founder of the United States Sanitary Commission and served as its only president. An influential minister, born and raised in Boston, Bellows went to Washington in May 1861 as head of a delegation of physicians representing the Women's Central Relief Association of New York and other organizations. Bellows's aim was to convince the government to establish a civilian auxiliary branch of the Army Medical Bureau. The Sanitary Commission, established by President Lincoln on June 13, 1861, provided nurses (mostly female) with medical supplies and organized hospital ships and soldiers' homes.

Clara Barton, a former teacher from Oxford, Massachusetts and clerk in the U.S. Patent Office, created a one-woman relief effort. In the summer of 1861, in response to a shortage of food and medicine in the growing Union army, she began personally purchasing and distributing supplies to wounded soldiers in Washington. Growing dissatisfied with bringing supplies to hospitals, Barton eventually moved her efforts to the battlefield itself. She was granted access through army lines and helped the wounded in numerous campaigns, soon becoming known as the "Angel of the Battlefield". She achieved national prominence, and high-ranking army surgeons requested her assistance in managing their field hospitals.

== Aftermath and Reconstruction era ==
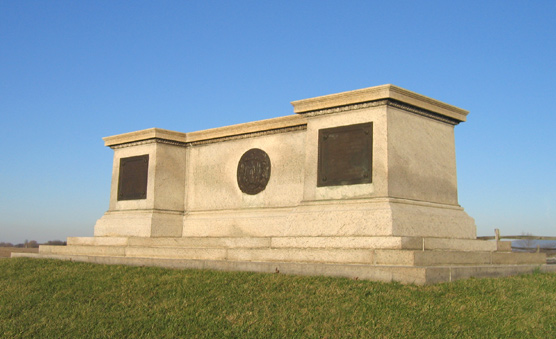
The Massachusetts State Monument on the Antietam Battlefield

In all, 12,976 servicemen from Massachusetts died during the war, about eight percent of those who enlisted and about one percent of the state's population (the population of Massachusetts in 1860 was 1,231,066). Official statistics are not available for the number of wounded. Across the nation, organizations such as the Grand Army of the Republic (GAR) were established to provide aid to veterans, widows and orphans. Massachusetts was the first state to organize a statewide Woman's Relief Corps, a female auxiliary organization of the GAR, in 1879.

With the war over and his primary goal completed, Governor Andrew declared in September 1865 that he would not seek re-election. Despite this loss, the Republican Party in Massachusetts would become stronger than ever in the post-war years. The Democratic party would be all but non-existent in the Bay State for roughly ten years due to their earlier anti-war platform. The group most affected by this political shift was the growing Boston Irish community, who had backed the Democratic Party and were without significant political voice for decades.

After the war, senators Sumner and Wilson would transform their pre-war antislavery views into vehement support for so-called "Radical Reconstruction" of the South. Their agenda called for civil rights for African Americans and harsh treatment of former Confederates.

For a time, the Republicans made progress on their agenda of dramatic reform measures. According to historian Eric Foner, Massachusetts state legislators passed the first comprehensive integration law in the nation's history in 1865. On the national level, Sumner joined with Representative Thaddeus Stevens from Pennsylvania and others to achieve Congressional approval of the Civil Rights Act of 1866, and the 13th, 14th and 15th Amendments to the U.S. Constitution, outlawing slavery and granting increased citizenship rights to former slaves.

As early as 1867, however, a national backlash against Radical Republicans and their sweeping civil rights programs made them increasingly unpopular, even in Massachusetts. When Sumner attempted in 1867 to propose dramatic reforms, including integrated schools in the South and re-distribution of land to former slaves, even Wilson refused to support him. By the 1870s, Republicans had diminished in power and Reconstruction proceeded along more moderate lines.

Culturally speaking, post-Civil War Massachusetts ceased to be a national center of idealistic reform movements (such as evangelicalism, temperance and antislavery) as it had been before the war. Growing industrialism, partly spurred on by the war, created a new culture of competition and materialism.

In 1869, Boston was the site of the National Peace Jubilee, a massive gala to honor veterans and to celebrate the return of peace. Conceived by composer Patrick Gilmore, who had served in an army band, the celebration was held in a colossal arena in Boston's Back Bay neighborhood designed to hold 100,000 attendees and specifically built for the occasion. A new hymn was commissioned for the occasion, written by Oliver Wendell Holmes Sr. and set to American Hymn by Matthais Keller. Spanning five days, the event featured a chorus of nearly 11,000 and an orchestra of more than 500 musicians. It was the largest musical gathering on the continent up to that time.

== See also ==
- List of Massachusetts Civil War units
- List of Massachusetts generals in the American Civil War
- Dedham, Massachusetts, in the American Civil War
