= 23rd Massachusetts Infantry Regiment =

23rd Regiment Massachusetts Volunteer Infantry
- Active: 28 September 1861 – 25 June 1865
- Disbanded: 25 June 1865
- Country: United States
- Allegiance: Union
- Branch: Union Army
- Type: Infantry
- Size: 1,761 men and officers
- Part of: 1862: 1st Brigade (Foster's), Coast Division; 1st Brigade (Amory's), 1st Division (Foster's), Coast Division; 1863: Heckman's Brigade, Goldsborough Expedition; 1864: Heckman's 1st Brigade, 2nd Division, XVIII Corps, Army of the Potomac
- Engagements: Battle of Roanoke Island; Battle of New Bern; Battle of Goldsborough Bridge; Battle of Kinston; Battle of White Hall; Battle of Smithfield Crossing; Battle of Port Walthall Junction; Battle of Arrowfield Church; Battle of Proctor's Creek; Battle of Cold Harbor; Siege of Petersburg; Battle of Wyse Fork

Commanders
- Notable commanders: Col. John Kurtz; Lt. Col. David P. Muzzey

23rd Regiment Massachusetts Volunteer Infantry was an infantry regiment in the Union army during the American Civil War. It was formed on 28 September 1861 in Lynnfield, Massachusetts, though some of the men were not mustered until the regiment's arrival to Annapolis, Maryland on 5 December, and comprised 6 companies from Essex County, Massachusetts and 1 each from Bristol, Plymouth, Middlesex and Worcester. An ex-militia officer, John Kurtz, was commissioned its colonel.

== Service ==
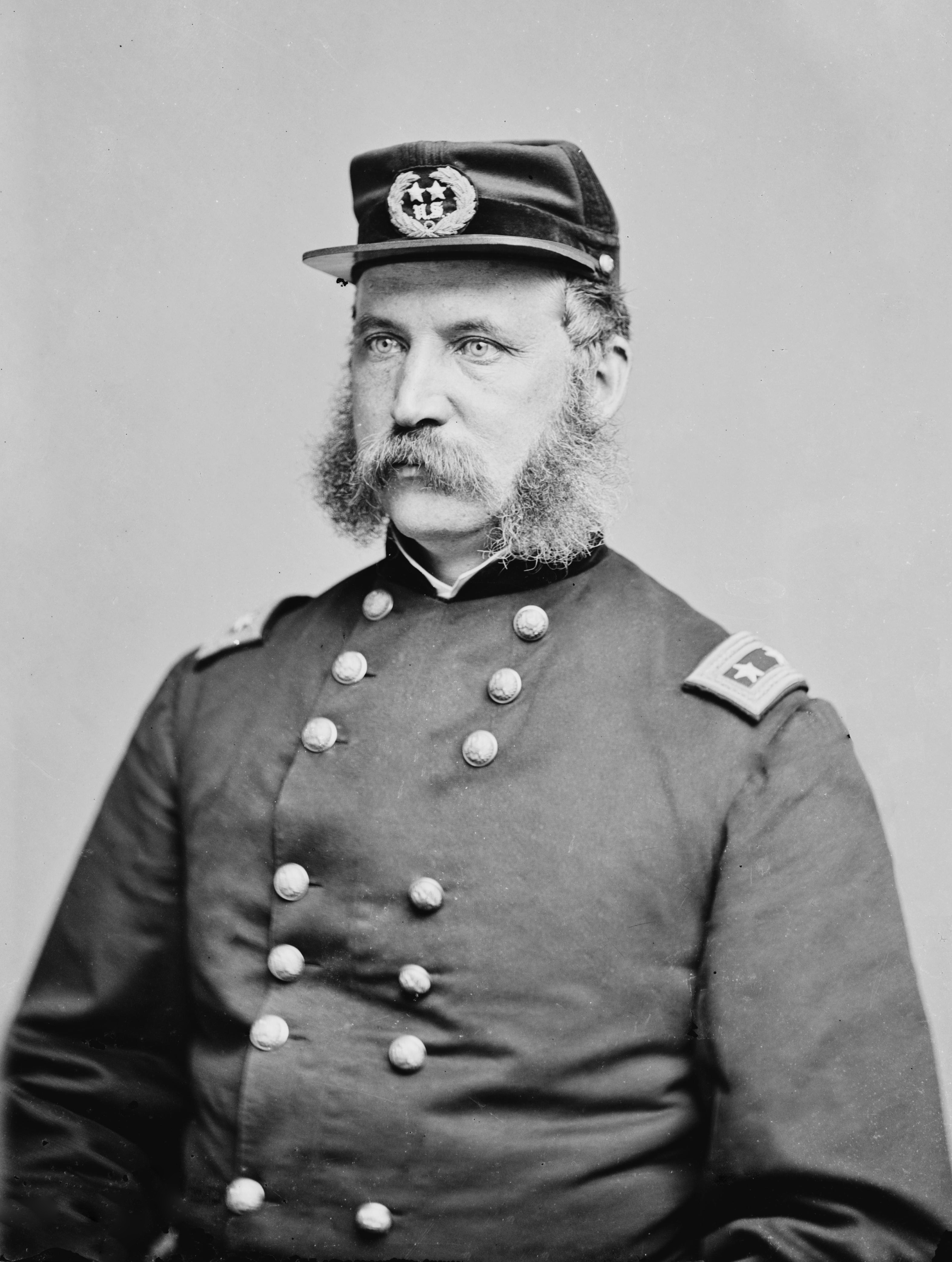
John G. Foster, ca. 1863. First in command of the 1st Brigade, Coast Division, later of the 1st Division, Coast Division

On 11 November 1861 the regiment left Massachusetts to arrive at Annapolis establishing Camp John A. Andrew and remained there until January of the next year. Thereupon it was made part of Foster's Brigade embarking for North Carolina with Burnside's Coast Division. The regiment took part in Battle of Roanoke Island on 8 February 1862 and Battle of New Bern on 14 March suffering losses; among the killed was Lt. Col. Henry Merritt of the regiment.

In May 1862, as three new divisions were formed, it became part of 1st Brigade (Amory's), 1st Division (Foster's). During Summer and Fall of 1862 the regiment was stationed in the vicinity or in New Bern, North Carolina and engaged in 3 skirmishes suffering little loss. On 10 December it was attached to the Goldsborough Expedition engaging the enemy at Kinston on 14 December and White Hall on 16 December losing 16 killed and fatally wounded. Though it ventured to Goldsborough it did not take part in the action at that place.

Middle of January to middle of April 1863 the regiment took part in Charleston Expedition becoming part of Heckman's Brigade. Upon returning in April it became part of the expedition to relieve Little Washington, Virginia; in July it was sent to Trenton. On 16 October 1863 the regiment left New Bern and embarked for Fort Monroe where it arrived 3 days later and camped near Newport News. In the early Winter more than 200 men and officers enlisted for 3 years. On 23 January the regiment boarded a steamer bound for Portsmouth where it occupied fortifications not 3 miles away from the city itself. In April it made an expedition to Smithfield where on the 16th it fought and suffered losses. Gen. Heckman's 1st Brigade, 2nd Division of the XVIII Corps, known as the "Star Brigade", was ordered to proceed up James River to Bermuda Hundred. It was engaged at Port Walthall Junction on 6 and 7 May, then at Arrowfield Church on the 9th. On 16 May at Proctor's Creek Star Brigade was outflanked in heavy fog resulting in Gen. Heckman being taken captive, 23rd Regiment losing 23 killed, 20 wounded and 51 taken prisoners. Among the mortally wounded was Lt. Col. John G. Chambers.

After that battle the XVIII Corps was transferred to the north bank of James where it joined the Army of the Potomac. The command of Star Brigade was given to Gen. George J. Stannard. During the assault on Cold Harbor on 3 June the 23rd lost 10 men killed, 39 wounded and 2 missing. Upon recrossing the river it was engaged in Siege of Petersburg until 25 August losing men frequently due to sharpshooter fire.

On 4 September the regiment crossed the Appomattox River and through Bermuda Hundred embarked for New Bern reaching it on the 10th and returning to the trenches on Trent. In late September the men who did not re-enlisted were sent home. Autumn saw the arrival of yellow fever to New Bern resulting also in losses in 23rd.

On 8 March 1865 the 23rd saw its last action at Wyse Fork losing 3 killed and 10 wounded. Until May the men remained near Kinston and then were returned to New Bern to provide military police services until 25 June when the regiment was decommissioned. Men received their pay and final discharge upon arriving to Readville, Massachusetts on 5 July.

== Casualties ==
Regiment during service lost 218 men – 4 officers and 80 enlisted men killed and fatally wounded and 2 officers and 132 enlisted men by disease.

== Regimental Association ==
Regimental association was established at an 1871 reunion electing president, vice presidents, adjutant, treasurer, chaplain and secretary. Its History Committee was tasked with maintaining regimental history and appointing members of each company to gather information relating to each company's history. A regimental history book was published in 1886. Especially the F Company was active in gathering and keeping records – in 1896 it published the history of the company.

== See also ==
- Massachusetts in the Civil War
- List of Massachusetts Civil War units
