= Leopold Karpeles =

United States Army Medal of Honor recipient

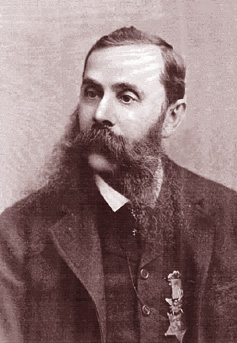
- Born: 9 September 1838; Prague, Bohemia
- Died: 2 February 1909 (aged 70)
- Burial place: Washington, D.C.
- Military career
- Allegiance: United States of America; Union
- Branch: United States Army; Union Army
- Service years: 1862–1863, 1864–1865
- Rank: Color Sergeant
- Units: 46th Massachusetts Infantry; 57th Massachusetts Infantry
- Conflicts: Battle of the Wilderness; Battle of North Anna
- Awards: Medal of Honor

Leopold Karpeles (9 September 1838 – 2 February 1909) was a flagbearer in the Union Army who received the Medal of Honor for his actions during the American Civil War.

Born in Prague, he immigrated to Texas early in life and made a living protecting convoys on the American frontier. An Abolitionist, he is known to have assisted the Underground Railroad before the outbreak of the war in 1861. Karpeles subsequently volunteered for the Union Army, carrying the battle standard for the 46th Massachusetts Volunteer Infantry Regiment during an expedition to North Carolina. He then joined the veteran 57th Massachusetts Volunteer Infantry Regiment.

During the Battle of the Wilderness, his unit suffered extensive casualties as the Union's right flank collapsed. Karpeles stood his ground, rallying a number of other men to hold their positions during the fight until sundown. Karpeles was wounded later in the campaign, forcing his retirement from the military. He spent the rest of his life in Washington, D.C. first in business and later working for the United States Department of the Treasury living in Washington until his death.

== Biography ==
Leopold Karpeles was born in Prague to a prominent and wealthy Jewish family, spending much of his early life around farms and ranches near the city. There, he and his brother Emile had been baptized, a requirement for attendance in Catholic school, and Emile took to the new religion, though Leopold was taught by his family to "lay low" about his religion. Karpeles moved to Galveston, Texas, in 1849 at age 11. Emile, 7 years his senior, had preceded him there and was running a successful dry goods store and Leopold intended to enroll in school and prepare to apprentice at the store. The town was predominately German in ancestry but had seen an influx of immigrants in the decade before. Studies early in his life left Karpeles fluent in English, French, German, Greek and Czech, and in Texas he also became proficient using the knife, lasso, rifle, pistol and saber as weapons. Karpeles' time in Texas initially marked mostly by school and work, which he ultimately found unsatisfactory, and so he volunteered to join supply convoys the store used to ship goods around Texas. In this work, he helped repel attacks and defend passengers, sometimes joining the Texas Rangers in the process. In this work, he found great satisfaction, especially with the outdoors and the sense of adventure. The work did distance him from his brother as he sought more independence.

Family records suggest details of Karpeles' life that other sources have not verified. Becoming more involved with the Texas Rangers and their informal style, Karpeles occasionally accompanied the Rangers to expeditions in Mexico and to conflicts involving Native Americans. Accounts from his family claim he participated in a number of skirmishes, but documentation of his activities during this time have not been found in state or national archives. In 1854, he relocated to Brownsville, Texas, where, according to family records, he was involved with two local militia groups, the Brownsville Guard and the Brownsville Tigers, protecting traders and caravans on the frontier during the late 1850s, though details and locations of any skirmishes are missing. Still, Karpeles was known to dislike both violence against women and children and slavery. During this time he is believed to have been involved in the Underground Railroad, helping escaped slaves find refuge with both Mexican and Seminole sympathizers.

After Texas voted to seceded from the Union on 23 February 1861, Karpeles and his brother split. Emile enlisted in the Confederate States Army and Leopold moved to Springfield, Massachusetts hoping for a job with one of his brother's business contacts, taking a job as a shop clerk. There, he began to make friends in the local abolitionist movement and helped the local stop in the Underground Railroad, though this was less risky than Texas.

=== Military service ===
"I am aware that while I'm providing a rallying point and courage for my comrades, I'm also a prime target for the enemy. I vowed to accept that risk when I assumed this obligation which I consider a privilege and an honor. ... My dedication to my country's flag rests on my ardent belief in this noblest of causes, equality for all. If my future rests under this earth rather than upon it, I fear not." — 1863 letter from Karpeles explaining his decision to volunteer as a color-bearer.

Encouraged by other abolitionists, Karpeles enlisted in a nine-month term with the 46th Massachusetts Volunteer Infantry Regiment and began training on 24 September 1862, being promoted to corporal before the end of training because of his prior experience. At this time, he volunteered to be a standard bearer, a volunteer role where he would not be armed and would carry the unit's battle standard, an assignment considered both dangerous and prestigious. Assigned to Company A, he was a part of a Union expedition to Goldsborough, North Carolina and served with distinction in several engagements including the Battle of Kinston, Battle of White Hall and then the Battle of Goldsborough Bridge through December 1862. A letter about Karpeles written by regimental commander W. S. Shurtless, remarked of the "Promptness with which (Karpeles) came upon the line of battle and the firmness with which he stood his ground, though his flag was several times pierced by bullets of the enemy, were so conspicuous as to be the subject of remark and commendation." Finishing this campaign, the unit returned to Springfield and was mustered out on 29 July 1863. Of the experience, Karpeles later wrote it was "inspiring" to be a flag bearer but also found that, "A soldier's life is a balancing act of striving to exercise control over one's mind and body despite unhealthful, wretched living conditions."

Karpeles then decided to rejoin the army in late 1863, answering a call from Colonel William Francis Bartlett who had mustered 1,038 men to form the 46th Massachusetts Volunteer Infantry Regiment, a unit consisting of veterans who had served at least nine months, as part of 1st Brigade, 1st Division of IX Corps. There, Karpeles was promoted to sergeant and assigned to Company E, tasked with training and is believed to have been the only Jewish member of the unit. Again he requested to carry the flag, and at Bartlett's recommendation, he was named color bearer for the regiment, with the rank of color sergeant. The unit left New England on 17 April 1864 traveled by foot and train to Washington, D.C., arriving on 25 April and encamped. During this time, the unit paraded past President Abraham Lincoln during a review, a memory Karpeles particularly cherished.

=== Medal of Honor action ===
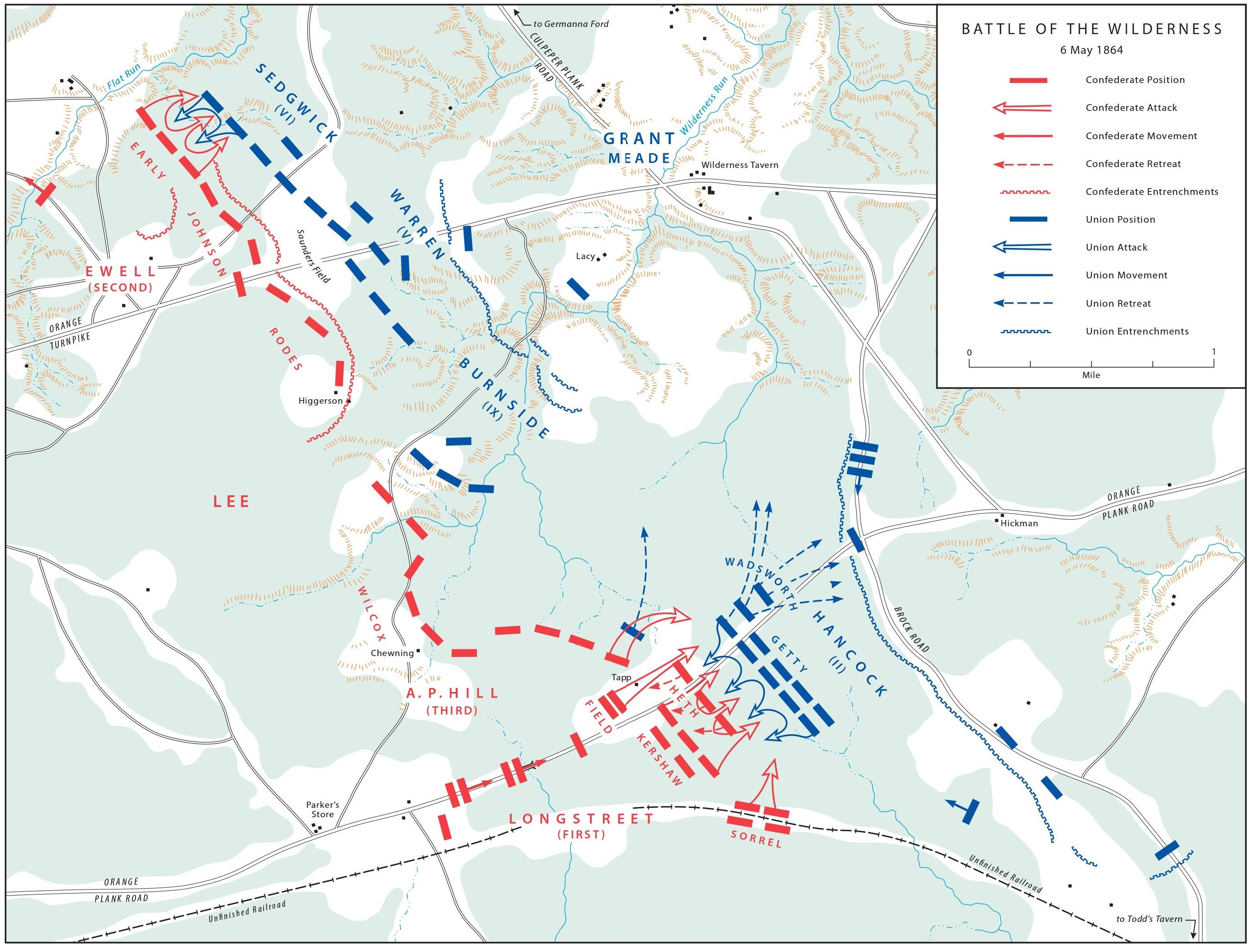
Actions in the Wilderness, May 6, 1864

In May 1864, the unit marched to join Ulysses S. Grant's Army of the Potomac in the middle of the Overland Campaign, arriving near Spotsylvania County, Virginia on 6 May, joining it after an overnight march hastened as a result of the unfolding Battle of the Wilderness. Advancing through difficult terrain and low visibility owing to musket smoke, Karpeles was assigned to Company H in the regiment's leading element. Once it made contact with the Confederate Army, the 57th was heavily engaged in brutal fighting; nearly half of the 548 men who entered the battle became casualties. The unit ended up taking heavier casualties than any other regiment at the battle, and had one of the highest casualty rates of the war, including Bartlett, who was wounded in the head by a bullet.

The right wing of the Union line crumbled under Confederate guns, causing a "general stampede" as other regiments began a disorderly retreat through the 57th, causing some of the unit to begin to lose its cohesion. Karpeles attempted to rally standing on a tree stump and entreating men who were retreating to re-form and make a stand, an action that could be seen as far back as the brigade command, as remembered by Brigadier General James S. Wadsworth. The action motivated about 34 men of the 57th to rally around Karpeles, followed by men of other retreating regiments from Pennsylvania and New York. He later recounted the action for Captain John Anderson, a company commander who wrote a book of the campaign. "We succeeded in forming these men into a fighting line and ordered them to advance on the approaching rebels, and by a rapid discharge of firearms managed to check the enemy." In the confusion of the battle, Confederate forces advanced past the rallied line, and passed it again in a retreat. A band of about 20 held this line through sunset, where it crawled back to Union lines during a lull in the battle.

Anderson and Bartlett filed reports on the action with the Adjutant General's office on 18 April 1870, with the award granted 11 days later. Karpeles was the first Jew to be awarded the Medal of Honor. In total, six Jews would be granted the medal for an actions during the American Civil War.

=== Later service ===
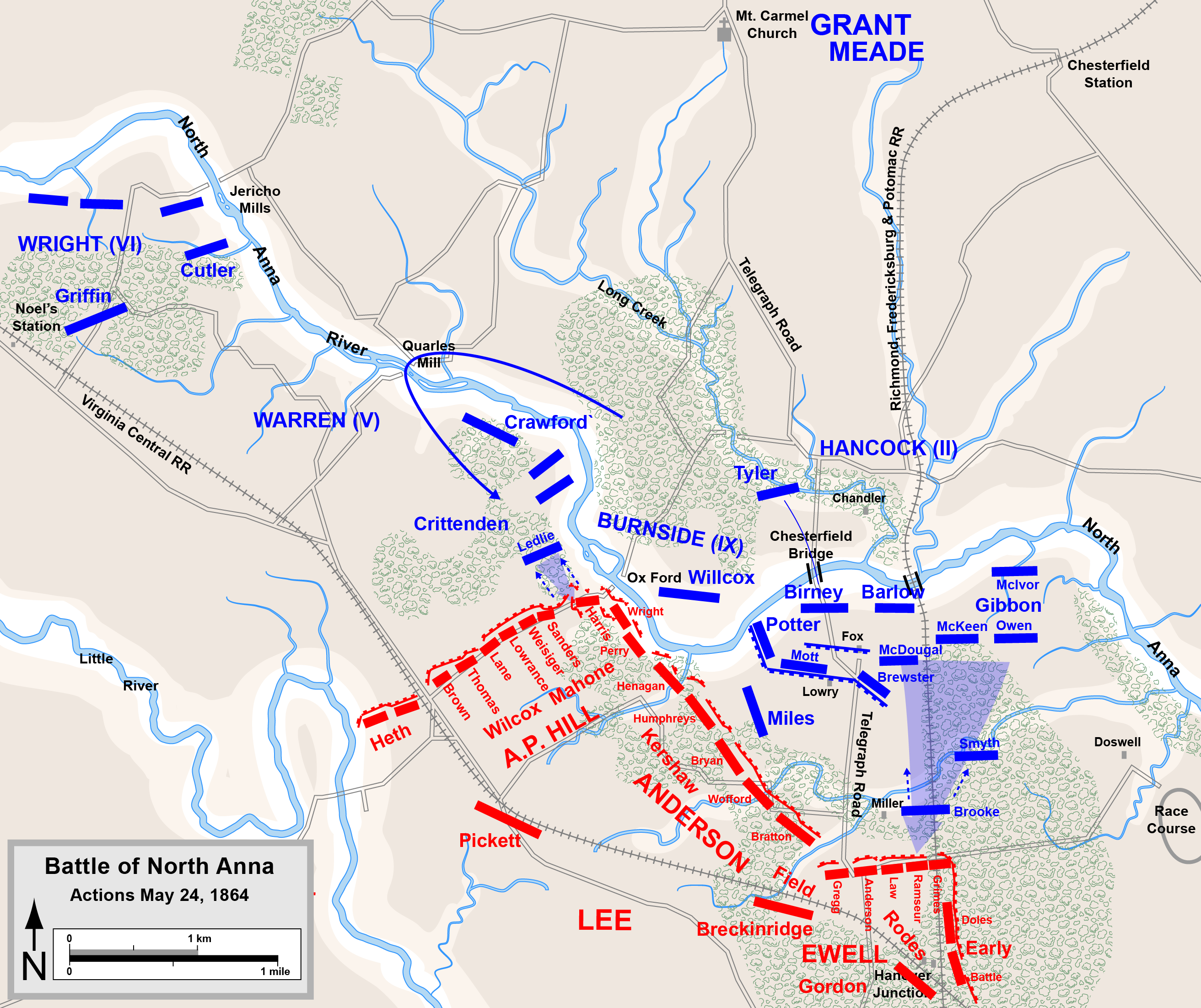
Actions during Battle of North Anna on May 24

In the following days, the 57th advanced to the next engagement at Spotsylvania Court House where it was engaged from 9 to 12 May, relying on an inspired charge with fixed bayonets intended to intimidate Confederate troops. But the progress after the first few days was slow, and after several days the regiment continued its march in pursuit of Lee's army.

Its next major engagement came in the Battle of North Anna on 24 May as part of the brigade of Brigadier General James H. Ledlie. Amid an ill-conceived attack ordered by an intoxicated Ledlie against strong Confederate positions, the 57th advanced across open ground and was nearly annihilated in the process. Karpeles was wounded in the leg and fell, but got up to continue the fight until his commander pulled the flag from him, and blood loss made it impossible to continue to advance. Other soldiers helped Karpeles back to the lines as the regiment was decimated. After the charge deteriorated, only 199 men in the regiment remained ready to fight. Karpeles was unconscious for several days and remained in the care of doctors and not allowed to return to combat until October.

He rejoined the unit during the siege of Petersburg and returned to duty during the Battle of Poplar Springs Church and later the Battle of Vaughan Road. But the wound reopened and became aggravated once he attempted to return to the lines, and he collapsed on 20 December 1864 during a raid, ending his military service. He is known as one of the longest-serving color bearers of the war who did not receive a crippling wound or injury.

=== Later life ===
Karpeles was evacuated to Mount Pleasant General Hospital in Washington, D.C. where his leg was treated. Initially thought to require an amputation, it was saved as part of the efforts of a 16-year-old volunteer, Sara Mundheim, who convinced doctors to allow her family to care for Karpeles in their home. His recovery would continue through the end of the war, and after that time, he and Mundheim married. The couple had a daughter, Theresa, born in December 1870.

The family set up a hat shop catering to the wealthy in Washington, D.C., and Karpeles took to overseeing sales and bookkeeping while his wife handled manufacturing. The family subsequently lived in a modest estate in a predominately Jewish area of the city. Sara died giving birth to a third child in 1872 and on her deathbed insisted Karpeles marry her sister, Henrietta. The second and third child from his original marriage died young, but his second marriage bore three sons and three daughters.

Karpeles later became ingrained in Washington society, valued as a speaker at political events and among veterans groups. In 1875 he was hired as a clerk in the United States Department of the Treasury in a job that paid $900 (~$26,386 in 2025) a year, but was known to spend much of it both on parties for people he cared about and for loans to friends in need. He was known among lawmakers and diplomats alike, and was known to have been familiar to Presidents Chester A. Arthur, Grant and William McKinley. He used these connections to advocate for labor causes, notably including a shortened working day and also became involved in the veterans organization, the Grand Army of the Republic, where he advocated for Memorial Day. He later also was a founding member and vice president of the Medal of Honor Legion, which helped to clarify the meaning of the award from a politically based one to an honored award bestowed specifically for valor in combat. With the 1898 outbreak of the Spanish–American War, Karpeles expressed a desire to return to the military, but age and a limp developed as a result of his wartime injury made this impossible.

Karpeles died in 1909 and was buried in the cemetery of the Washington Hebrew Congregation, with a gravestone that includes the Medal of Honor emblem. His medal was later lost in a fire.

== Medal of Honor citation ==
Rank and organization: Sergeant, Company E, 57th Massachusetts Infantry. Place and date: At Wilderness, Va., May 6, 1864. Entered service at: Springfield, Mass. Birth: Hungary. Date of issue: April 30, 1870.

Citation:

While color bearer, rallied the retreating troops and induced them to check the enemy's advance.

== See also ==
- List of Jewish Medal of Honor recipients
- List of American Civil War Medal of Honor recipients: G–L

== Bibliography ==
- Brody, Seymour (2004), Jewish Heroes & Heroines of America: 151 True Stories of Jewish American Heroism, Hollywood, Florida: Fredrick Fell Publishers, ISBN 978-0-8119-0823-8
- Jones, J.W. (1897), The Story of American Heroism, Thrilling Narratives of Personal Adventures during the Great Civil War, Springfield, Ohio: The Werner Company, ISBN 978-1-5075-7216-0
- Levitan, Tina (1996), First Facts in American Jewish History, Jason Aronson Inc., ISBN 978-1-5682-1895-3
- Mikaelian, Allen (2003), Medal of Honor: Profiles of America's Military Heroes From the Civil War to the Present, New York City, New York: Hyperion Books, ISBN 978-0-7868-8576-3
- Rhea, Gordon C. (2000), To the North Anna River: Grant and Lee, May 13–25, 1864, Baton Rouge, Louisiana: Louisiana State University Press, ISBN 978-0-8071-3111-4
