= David P. Muzzey =

American lawyer

David Patterson Muzzey
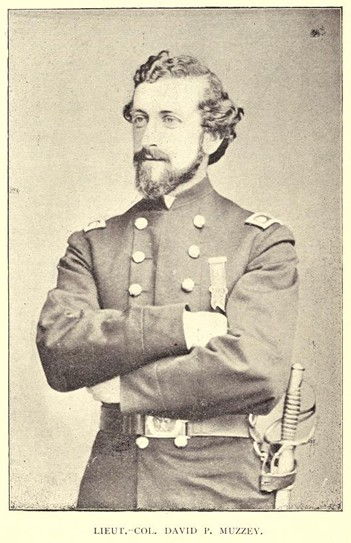
- Born: November 8, 1838; Cambridgeport, Massachusetts, US
- Died: August 3, 1910 (aged 71); Cambridge, Massachusetts, US
- Military career
- Allegiance: United States of America
- Branch: Union Army
- Service years: 1861-1865
- Rank: Lieutenant Colonel
- Commands: Captain; Company G, 3rd Massachusetts Volunteer Cavalry
- Other work: lawyer, overseer of the poor

David Patterson Muzzey (8 November 1838 – 3 August 1910) was an American lawyer and overseer of the poor from the state of Massachusetts who volunteered to join Union Army during the American Civil War.

== Early life ==
David Patterson Muzzey was born on 8 November 1838 in Cambridgeport, Massachusetts, to Reverend Artemas B. Muzzey and Hepsibeth Patterson Muzzey. His ancestors fought during the American Revolutionary War on the American side; Isaac Muzzey was killed during Battle of Lexington and was buried under the Lexington monument. The ground whereupon the battle took place was property of Niebur Muzzey, who later donated it to the town of Lexington.

Muzzey was educated in Cambridge public schools, attended the Harvard University as well as Hopkins Classical School. In March 1854 he moved to Concord, New Hampshire and lived there until September 1857 when he moved with his parents to Newburyport, Massachusetts. Later he studied law in the office of his brother Henry W. Muzzey in Boston, Massachusetts.

In 1860 he was admitted to Suffolk bar in Boston and started his practice settled in the building that once belonged to Judge Samuel Livermore. He was part of the Wide Awakes in Fall of 1860.

== Civil War ==
On 23 May 1861, he enlisted as a private in Company A, 1st Regiment Massachusetts Volunteer Infantry and camped with the men at Fresh Pond in ice houses. A minor unrest broke out among the troops due to the condition of food they were served – to rein in the tempers Col. Robert Cowdin was called.

Inadequate lodging resulted in the camp being moved away and designated as "Camp Cameron". On 15 June the regiment was ordered to proceed to Boston. Later it marched to Washington, D. C., then Georgetown where it established "Camp Banks". The regiment remained there until it was called to fight during First Battle of Bull Run. After retreating, it returned to Washington. In Bladensburg Muzzey was promoted to second lieutenant and mustered with 23rd Regiment Massachusetts Volunteer Infantry with which he fought at Roanoke Island and New Bern as part of Burnside's North Carolina Expedition. In New Bern he was tasked with provost duty. On 17 July he resigned commission and returned to Massachusetts.

On 16 September he was again commissioned as 2nd lieutenant in Company G, 41st Regiment Massachusetts Volunteer Infantry commanded by Col. Thomas Edward Chickering (later reorganized as 3rd Massachusetts Volunteer Cavalry). On 1 November he was promoted to first lieutenant. The regiment acted as bodyguard to Maj. Gen. Nathaniel P. Banks on board of the steamer North Star bound for New Orleans where Banks was to relieve Gen. Benjamin Butler. Upon arriving Muzzey's regiment was sent to Baton Rouge for provost duty.

Muzzey's unit was stationed in Baton Rouge for several months until departing for the western bank of Mississippi to take part in the Bayou Teche Campaign; during that time Muzzey was placed in charge of the prisoners captured by Brig. Gen. Cuvier Grover. He was commissioned as deputy provost marshal at New Iberia, Louisiana under the orders of Capt. Long of the 31st Regiment Massachusetts Volunteer Infantry. On 17 June 1863 the regiment was moved back to Baton Rouge and took part in the Siege of Port Hudson where Muzzey was promoted to captain of Company G, 3rd Massachusetts Cavalry. Gen. Nathaniel P. Banks of the Army of the Gulf issued an order calling 1,000 volunteers to storm the confederate earthworks measuring 7 miles at Port Hudson – Muzzey and 30 others from the regiment agreed after being promised Medals of Honor. The to-be "Forlorn Hope" never stormed the fort as it surrendered first; no medals were awarded on the ground that the unit failed to assault the earthworks.

Following the surrender the regiment was moved to New Orleans to become part of 4th Cavalry Brigade under Gen. U. A. M. Dudley, inhabitant of Roxbury. Regiment took part in Red River Campaign and later, after returning to New Orleans, it ventured to fight in the Shenandoah Valley where Muzzey served for several months in the staff of Gen. Philip Sheridan.

In the spring of 1865 the regiment was moved to Fort Leavenworth to join the Powder River Expedition of Maj. Gen. Patrick Edward Connor. Thereupon on 15 August 1865 Muzzey receive promotion to major. Following a 500-mile advance to Julesburg, Colorado the war department sent an order directing the return of the regiment to Fort Leavenworth as the terms of service were to expire on 1 November 1865. After mustering out Muzzey left for Massachusetts with his new command and passing through Canada he arrived at Gallops Island. After arrival, Muzzey was promoted to lieutenant colonel. On 8 October he was paid off and discharged.

== Later life ==
Following the war Muzzey practiced law for a year in Leavenworth, Kansas. Later he studied to become a Unitarian minister at Harvard Divinity School and graduated in 1869; he was settled over the Unitarian churches of Littleton and Stow, Massachusetts. In February 1877 he was appointed overseer of the poor in Cambridge, Massachusetts and secretary of the board in May which offices he held until death. He introduced many innovations which proved beneficial to the department.

Muzzey died of sepsis after three weeks of illness on 3 August 1910 in Cambridge. He was survived by his wife Sarah A. Muzzey (née Turner) and son Herbert Sprague Muzzey. He was buried at Stow.
