= Charles Adam Heckman =

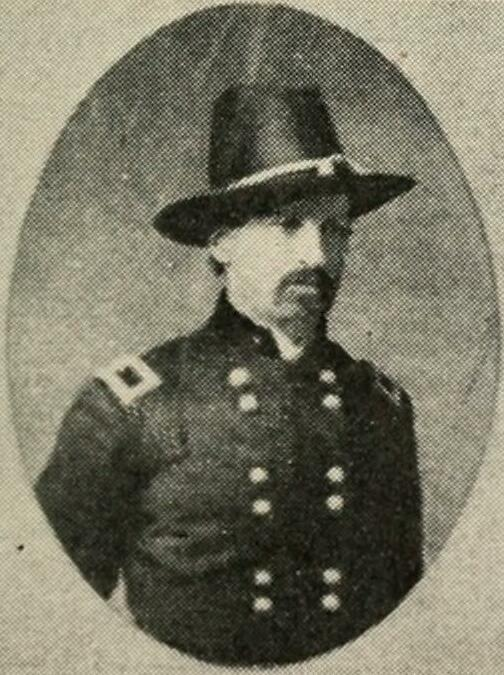
- Born: December 3, 1822; Easton, Pennsylvania
- Died: January 14, 1896 (aged 73); Germantown, Pennsylvania
- Burial place: Easton Cemetery, Easton, Pennsylvania
- Military career
- Allegiance: United States of America; Union
- Branch: United States Army; Union Army
- Service years: 1846–1847; 1861–1865
- Rank: Brigadier General
- Commands: 9th New Jersey Volunteer Infantry
- Conflicts: Mexican–American War; American Civil War; Battle of Roanoke Island; Battle of New Berne; Battle of Fort Macon; Battle of Kinston; Battle of Goldsborough Bridge; Battle of Port Walthall Junction; Battle of Proctor's Creek; Battle of Chaffin's Farm
- Other work: Railroad conductor

Charles Adam Heckman (1822-1896) was a brigadier general in the Union Army during the American Civil War. He fought in many of the early battles in North Carolina and later served in the Army of the James during the siege of Petersburg.

== Biography ==
Heckman was born in Pennsylvania and graduated from Minerva Seminary in 1837. He served in the volunteer army during the Mexican–American War, becoming a sergeant by the time he was mustered out of service in 1848. Apart from the Civil War, Heckman spent most of his career as a conductor for the New Jersey Central Railroad.

Immediately after the Civil War began, Heckman enlisted in the 1st Pennsylvania Volunteer Regiment and was elected captain. Before seeing any action in that regiment, he was appointed major of the 9th New Jersey Volunteer Regiment. On October 8, 1861, he became the regimental lieutenant colonel and joined Ambrose Burnside's expedition to North Carolina. He fought at Roanoke Island and was promoted colonel just two days after the battle. He was wounded at the battles of New Berne and Young's Crossroads. On November 29, 1862, he was promoted to brigadier general of U.S. volunteers.

When General Burnside left for Virginia, he left Union forces in North Carolina under the command of John G. Foster. In the winter of 1862, Foster led an expedition against the Wilmington and Weldon Railroad at Goldsborough, North Carolina. General Heckman led a brigade in Foster's expedition at the battles of Kinston, White Hall and Goldsborough.

Throughout most of 1863, Heckman was in command of the District of Beaufort, briefly commanding the Union defenses at New Bern. By the end of 1863, he was sent to Virginia to command the Union garrison at Newport News, Virginia. He temporarily commanded George W. Getty's division at the beginning of 1864.

On April 28, 1864, Heckman was assigned to command the 1st Brigade, 2nd Division, XVIII Corps in the Army of the James. He was wounded at the battle of Port Walthall Junction and taken prisoner at the battle of Proctor's Creek. In September 1864, he was exchanged and, when he returned to duty, was assigned to command the 2nd Division in the XVIII Corps. Heckman led his division at the battle of Chaffin's Farm in support of General George J. Stannard's main attack against Fort Harrison. When Heckman moved forward, his troops veered off far to the north. Instead of coming directly to the aid of Stannard's division, Heckman's men launched a costly attack against Confederate trenches near Forts Gilmer and Johnson. During the fighting in Fort Harrison, XVIII Corps commander Edward O. C. Ord was severely wounded and carried from the field. Heckman then assumed command of the corps. With this change in command at a crucial point, the fighting ground to a halt, and the Union forces constructed a defensive line. After an undistinguished show of leadership during the fighting on September 29, army commander Benjamin F. Butler decided to replace Heckman in command of the corps with his chief of staff, Godfrey Weitzel. Returning to command his division, Heckman helped repulse the Confederate attack the following day.

In December, Heckman was transferred to command the 3rd Division in the newly created XXV Corps. Briefly from January to February in 1865, he was in command of the XXV Corps, but resigned from the army on May 25, 1865. Heckman returned to work for the New Jersey Central Railroad as a conductor and railroad dispatcher following the war.

== See also ==
- List of American Civil War generals (Union)
