= David Muzzey =

David Muzzey may refer to:

- David P. Muzzey (1838–1910), American lawyer and overseer of the poor from Massachusetts
- David Saville Muzzey (1870–1965), American historian
