= Edward Day Cohota =

Chinese-American soldier (c. 1843–1935)

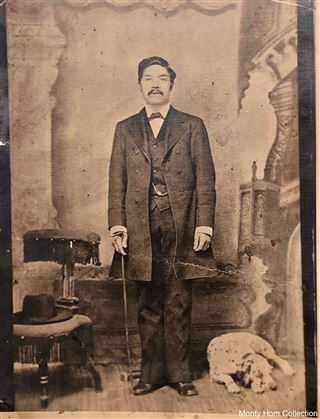
- The earliest known photo of Cohota
- Born: c. 1843; Shanghai, Qing Empire
- Died: November 18, 1935; Parmalee, South Dakota
- Burial place: Valentine, Nebraska
- Spouse: Anna Dorothea Halstenson
- Military career
- Allegiance: United States
- Branch: Army
- Service years: 1864–1865; 1866–1895
- Rank: Private
- Units: Company I, 23rd Massachusetts Infantry; Company C, 15th Colorado Infantry; Company H, 15th South Dakota Infantry.
- Known for: Guarding Sitting Bull
- Conflicts: Second Battle of Drewry's Bluff; Battle of Cold Harbor

Edward Day Cohota (c. 1843 – November 18, 1935) was a Chinese soldier who fought in the American Civil War for the Union Army.

== Early life ==
Edward Day Cohota was born around 1843, likely in Shanghai, China, though conflicting reports obscure his exact birthdate. The earliest account of Edward dates to December 27, 1845, when a ship's master named Sargent Sawyer Day sailed his ship, the Cohota, out of Shanghai's port. Stowed away he found two starved, ragged Chinese brothers, one a few years older than the other. Both were near the brink of death but the Captain kept them aboard instead of turning back. While the older boy died during the voyage, the younger boy survived and Day decided to raise the surviving child himself, naming him Edward Day Cohota and choosing December 27 as his birthday. Edward grew up in the Captain's home in Gloucester, Massachusetts, developing a close, lifelong relationship with the family. In childhood Edward received education and was trained to be a sailor.

== Time as a soldier ==
Cohota enlisted with Company I of the 23rd Massachusetts Infantry Regiment of the Army of the Potomac and mustered in on February 12, 1864 at Boston Harbor's Long Island. He participated in many battles and skirmishes including the second battle at Drewry's Bluff on May 5, 1864 where reportedly seven bullets went through his clothes but none injured him. A bullet grazed his head in early June at the Battle of Cold Harbor, Virginia and left a permanent part in his hair. The muster roll for his unit shows him "absent sick" from sometime in the period between February and June to sometime in September or October 1864. Cohota was discharged on June 25, 1865 as the war concluded. After being unable to find steady work as a sailor for almost a year he met some war buddies by chance, one of whom was a recruiting sergeant, and went to a bar to celebrate. He drank a bit too much and when the alcohol wore off he found he had re-enlisted in the army.

Cohota served as a private in Company C and H of the 15th Infantry Regiment. He was stationed at Fort Union in New Mexico, Fort Randall in South Dakota for twenty years, then at Fort Sheridan in Illinois, and finally at Fort Niobrara in Nebraska. In 1883, Cohota married Anna Halstensen, a Norwegian woman, at Fort Randall. There he supposedly guarded a prominent Indian chief resistance fighter, Sitting Bull.

== Later life ==
In 1892, Cohota was caught selling alcohol and running a gambling hall for soldiers at Fort Sheridan on Illinois' Lake Michigan near Chicago and was moved to Fort Niobrara in Nebraska near the South Dakota border. He retired from the army in August 1895 and settled with his family in Valentine, Nebraska. There, he and Anna had six children: Lucy, Edward, Elizabeth, William, Daisy, and Miles. In February 1899 Anna died five months after giving birth to Miles and she is buried in Fort Leavenworth National Cemetery. By May 1900 Cohota himself had become ill and his youngest children were placed in an orphanage in Omaha while the older children were living with Charles Sherman. Miles died sometime between May and July of that year when Cahota was arrested for stealing cattle. Unable to afford bail, he spent the next nine months in jail before he was acquitted and released on April 19, 1901. He later reunited with Lucy, Elizabeth and Edward. On March 2, 1902, his adoptive father, Sargent Sawyer Day, died in Gloucester. By the following January he had gathered the means to buy the Kangaroo restaurant in Valentine. Cohota also worked as a baker, ran a livery barn business for a number of years and opened restaurants in Valentine. In 1910 his restaurant burned down but he rebuilt it.

== Fight for citizenship ==
Cohota's last battle was with the Federal Government. Despite fighting for and being wounded for the Union in the Civil War as well as three decades of service as an American soldier, he was not a citizen of the US. He thought that his service, as well as his long residence in the US, naturalized him. In 1912, Cohota was informed of his non-citizen status when he was denied a homestead claim on that basis. Furthermore, the Chinese Exclusion Act of 1882 prevented the US government from granting him citizenship and this law would not be repealed until five years after his death. Even after gaining the support of Senator Norris Brown and presenting his case to Congress, he did not win this battle though he continued his fight till his death. He did, however, receive a veteran's pension.

In 1917, Cohota retired to National Home for Disabled Volunteer Soldiers’ Battle Mountain Sanitarium in Hot Springs, South Dakota. In his final days, he used to tour the country in his car and cook for his family. He died on November 18, 1935, on the front porch of the family home at Parmelee, South Dakota, and was later buried in Valentine, Nebraska. The US Department of Veteran's Affairs honored Mr. Cohota's service by designating him Army Veteran of the Day on May 15, 2023.

Edward Day Cohota
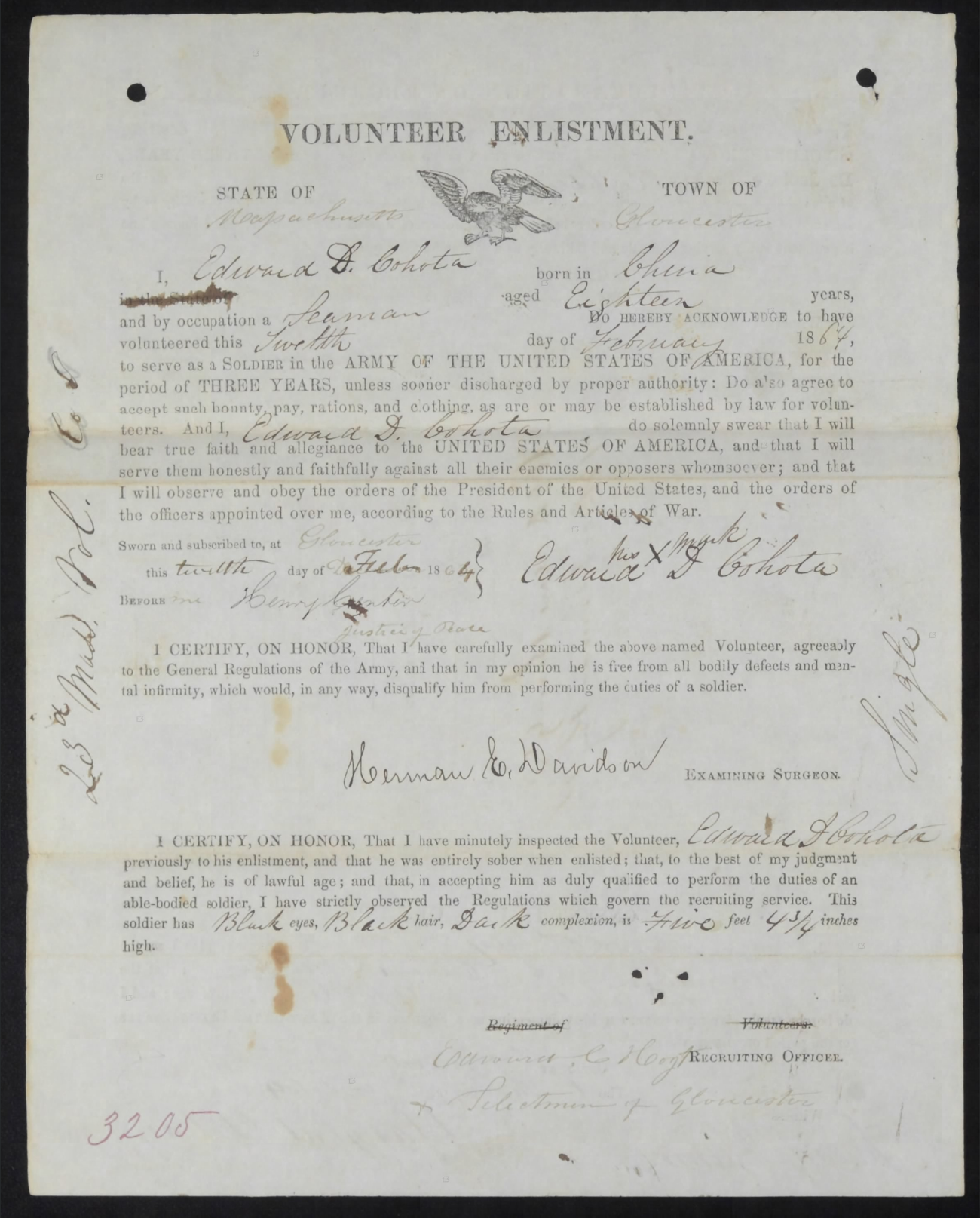
Cohota's February 12, 1861 enlistment

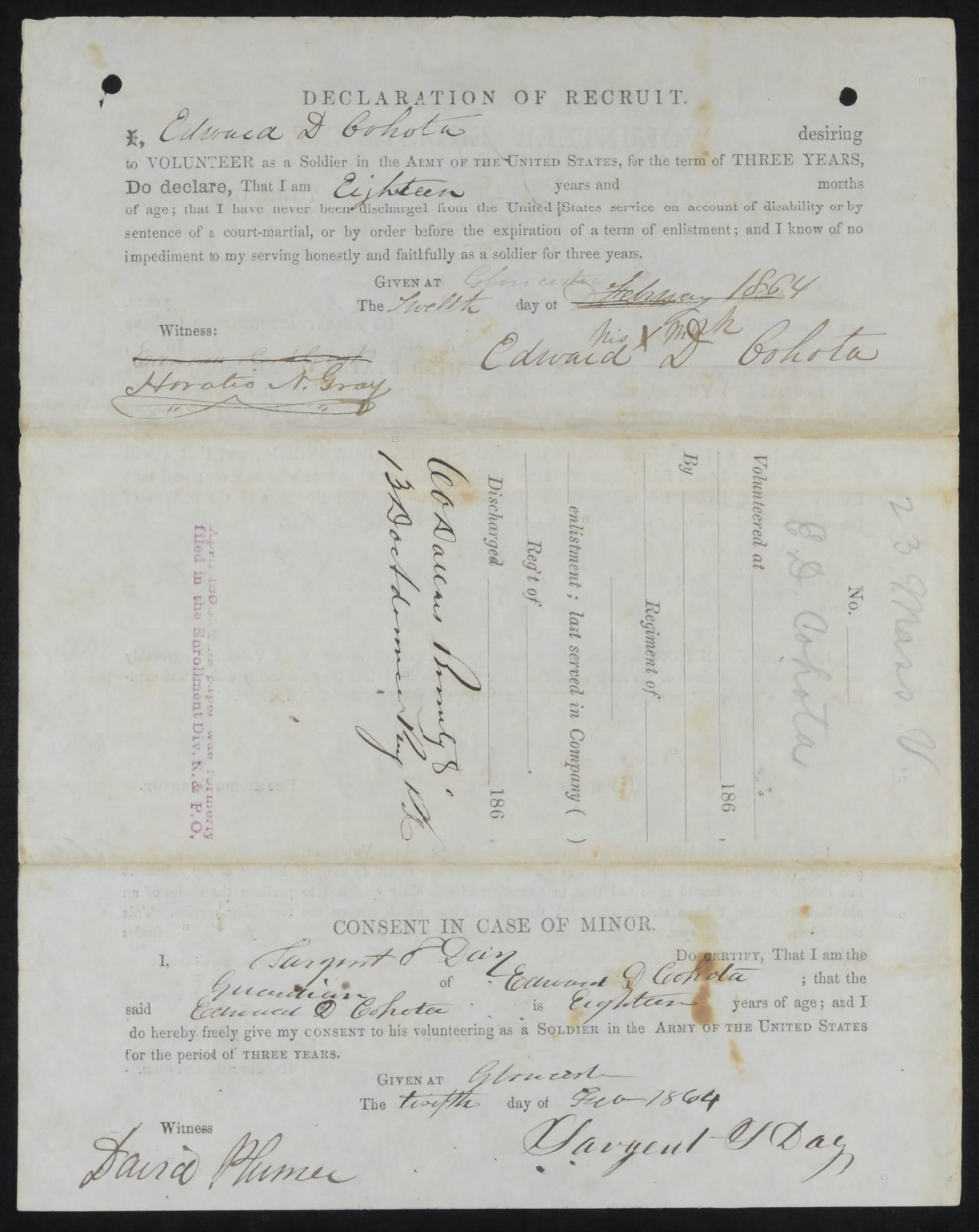
Sargent Day's signature on Cohota's enlistment asserting that he was 18. He was actually 15.

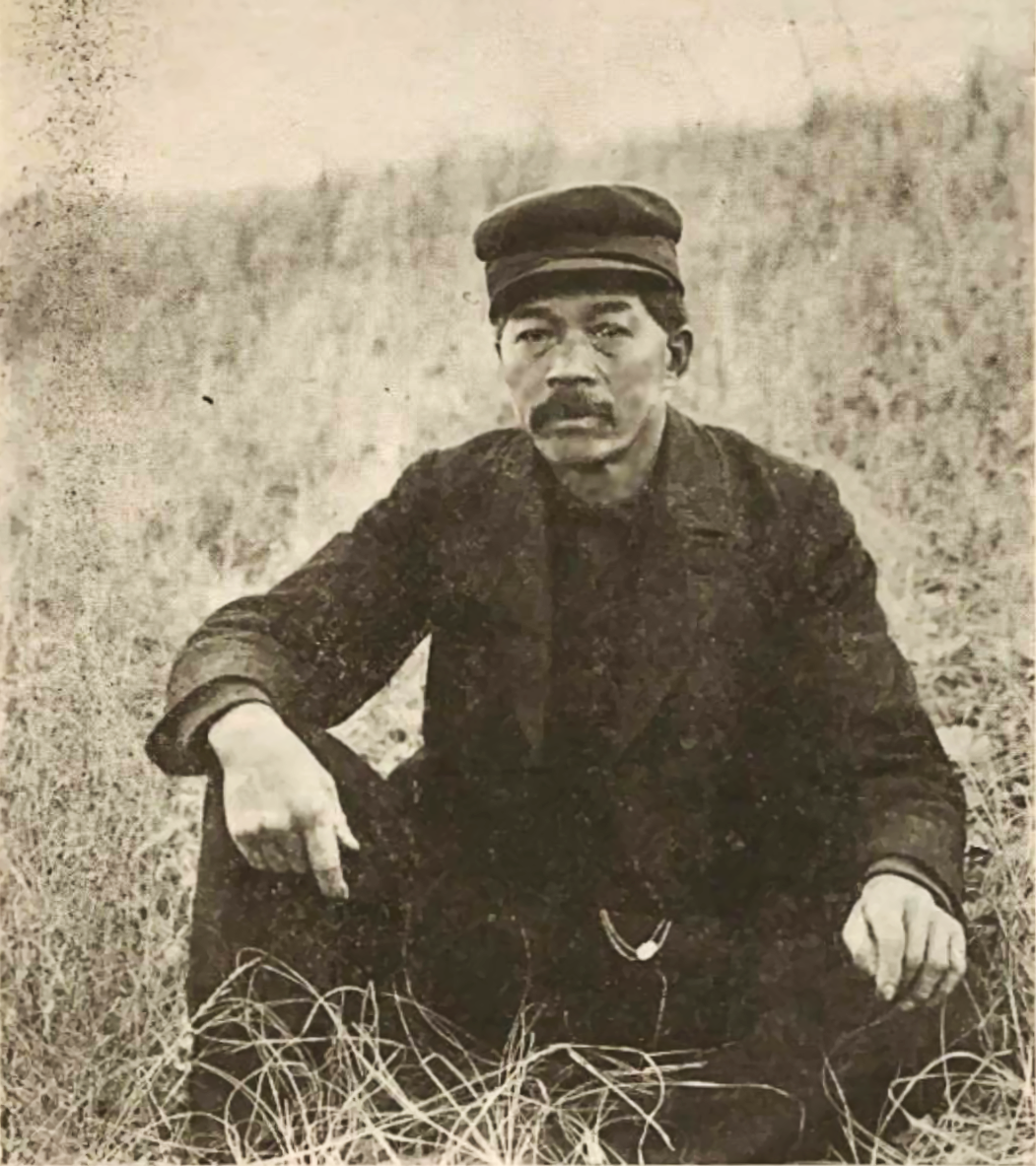
Chinese-born Civil War veteran Edward Cohota in a more natural setting.
