= Muzzey =

Muzzey may refer to:

== People with the surname ==
- David P. Muzzey (1838–1910), American lawyer.
- David Saville Muzzey (1870-1965), American historian.
- Kerry Muzzey (born 1970), American classical and film and television composer.
