= 9th New Jersey Infantry Regiment =

- New Jersey state flag
- Active: October 1861 to July 1865
- Country: United States
- Allegiance: Union
- Branch: Army
- Type: Infantry
- Nickname: Jersey Muskrats
- Equipment: Springfield rifle muskets
- Engagements: Roanoke Island, New Bern, Fort Macon, Deep Creek, Kinston, Walthall, Drewry's Bluff, Cold Harbor, Siege of Petersburg, Wyse Fork, garrison duty at Goldsboro

Commanders
- Notable commanders: Colonel Joseph W. Allen, Charles A. Heckman, Colonel Adam Zabriskie, Colonel James Stewart, Jr.

The 9th New Jersey Infantry Regiment (also called Jersey Muskrats) was an American Civil War infantry regiment from New Jersey that served from October 1861 through July 1865 in the Union Army. The regiment got its nickname, Jersey Muskrats, during the Battle of Roanoke Island when they successfully "sloshed through shoe sucking mud into waist deep water in "division" formation", giving the regiment a two-company front flanking the enemy. The regiment was the last to leave the state in 1861 but the first to see battle.

The 9th took part in the Burnside Expedition into North Carolina. The regiment remained in North Carolina with the occupation force until early 1864 when the first enlistment was up. In January 1864 the regiment went back to New Jersey where more than 50% of those whose three-year term was about to expire reenlisted. This allowed the regiment to add "Veteran" to the name, a mark of distinction for the men. Those who reenlisted for three more years were given a 30-day veteran furlough. The regiment then moved into Virginia leading to the Siege of Petersburg. The 9th was then transferred back to North Carolina for garrison duty for the remainder of the war.

== Formation ==
The 9th New Jersey Infantry Regiment was raised as a regiment of riflemen with broadsides posted throughout the state during September 1861 for 'sharpshooters', men who could show proficiency with a rifle. Recruiting started in September but the first muster occurred on 5 October at Camp Olden near Trenton. The camp was named for the governor of New Jersey, Charles Smith Olden. The regiment's nickname was the Jersey Muskrats.

The regiment was issued new Springfield rifle-muskets (possibly the Springfield Model 1861) in late November after being issued smoothbore muskets. The men, recruited as sharpshooters, protested and Governor Olden made a special request to get the best weapon available to men.

Key training dates:

- 5 October 1861 – First Muster at Camp Olden near Newark, New Jersey
- 26 November 1861 – Issued Springfield rifled-muskets to replace smoothbore muskets (reference?)
- 4 December 1861 – Embarked for Washington to join the Union Army

== Federal service ==
Undated photograph of volunteer

The 9th moved out of Camp Olden on 4 December for Washington, D.C., to join the Union Army. The regiment participated in the North Carolina Expedition (also called the Burnside Expedition) into Roanoke Island, North Carolina, commanded by Ambrose Burnside.

Key service dates: (non-battle related)

- 6 December 1861 – Arrived at Washington, entered camp on the Bladensburg turnpike
- 4 January 1862 – Embarked for Annapolis, Maryland

=== First battle ===
The first test of the regiment came in February 1862 during the Burnside Expedition to Roanoke Island in North Carolina.

The regiment was assigned to the command of Brigadier-General Jesse L. Reno, embarked on two naval vessels on 10 January, and made for Fortress Monroe. They remained there for two days when sail was made and the vessels headed south. The next day the ships anchored at Hatteras Inlet.

Colonel Joseph Allen and Dr. Weller (Surgeon) drowned while returning to the ship, Ann E. Thompson, from a meeting with General Burnside on 15 January. Lieutenant-Colonel Heckman, Adjutant Zabriskie, and Quartermaster Keys were also aboard the gig but survived. Heckman assumed command. There were other incidents reported by ships in and around the inlet (e.g. sand bars, etc.).

On 7 February, the force landed on Roanoke Island and entrenched for the evening. The 9th was in Second Brigade, under General Reno. At 6 o'clock the next morning (8 Feb.), First Brigade advanced against the enemy. The 9th was ordered forward about 8 o'clock to pass the 51st New York and report to General Foster.

The 9th lost 9 killed and 25 wounded.

=== Into North Carolina ===
On 11 March 1862 the regiment boarded ships again and landed the next day at the mouth of the Neuse River. The brigade attacked an entrenched enemy position the morning of the 14th. Their destination was New Bern, North Carolina (sometimes written as "Newberne"). The 9th lost 4 killed and 58 wounded.

When Burnside and most of the Expedition force transferred to Virginia, the 9th remained in the Carolinas as part of an 8,000-man coastal occupation force. In May 1862, two companies were disbanded and the men were distributed to fill out the ranks of the other companies; this left the 9th with the usual 10 companies of an infantry regiment instead of the original 12.

Regimental headquarters was set up near "Carolina City", the companies were assigned railroad guard and garrison duty throughout the area.

The regimental headquarters remained in barracks during the Battle of Fort Macon on 25 and 26 April 1862 but various companies were assigned picket duty to guard the approaches from Wilmington.

On 26 July 1862 Colonel Heckman led six companies of the 9th to Young's Cross Roads. Colonel Heckman and Surgeon Woodhull were slightly wounded during this skirmish.

Company B was involved in a skirmish near New Bern on 31 August 1862. A corporal was wounded in the hand. Two more companies went after the enemy and returned with several prisoners.

Major-General John G. Foster led an expedition to Tarboro, North Carolina (also called "Tarborough") starting 31 October 1862. The force met heavy resistance about 4 o'clock in the afternoon on 2 November. Second Brigade, commanded by a Colonel Stevenson, ordered the 44th Massachusetts forward but they retired after a brief engagement. The 24th Massachusetts was then brought forward to engage the enemy but they were also forced back under heavy fire. The 9th rushed forward past the enemy fort and the bridge fired by the enemy to reach a clay bank beyond the swamp near Rowell's Mills.

Colonel Heckman and Company I of the 9th attacked across the still burning bridge into the enemy fort. Other components of the regiment forded the water above and below the bridge. Faced with this attack the enemy abandoned their position.

On 8 December 1862 Colonel Heckman was given an independent command that included the 9th New Jersey, a detachment from the 3rd New York Cavalry, and the 1st Rhode Island Battery.

On 11 December, General Foster led another raid intent on disrupting traffic on the Weldon Railroad indirectly supporting General Burnside's attack on Fredericksburg, Virginia. Foster led 10,000 to 12,000 directly west toward Goldsboro, North Carolina (sometimes written as "Goldsborough").

The regiment spent the last part of 1862 on several raids intent on keeping the enemy busy:

- 12 December 1862 – Deep Creek, North Carolina
- 13 December 1862 – Southwest Creek and before Kinston, North Carolina
- 14 December 1862 – Kinston, North Carolina
- 16 December 1862 – Whitehall, North Carolina
- 17 December 1862 – Goldsboro, North Carolina

Colonel Heckman was promoted to brigadier general for his actions at Goldsboro. Heckman was replaced by Abram Zabriskie, who had been serving as lieutenant-colonel. The New Jersey legislature sent a new state flag to the regiment in recognition of their actions.

=== Into South Carolina ===
On 20 January 1863 the regiment moved out with General Foster's command for South Carolina. The regiment reached St. Helena Island on 9 February or 10 where they remained in drill for two months. After a brief move toward Charleston (see Samuel Francis Du Pont 7 April attack) the regiment moved back to North Carolina.

=== Back to North Carolina ===
On 13 August 1863 Major-General Peck assumed command of the Department of North Carolina from General Heckman. The 9th was sent to Carolina City due to "chills and fever". The regiment remained there for about six weeks. During this time nearly 300 men were unfit for duty. The regiment then moved to Newport News, Virginia on 18–20 October where Heckman's command was based. The 9th remained there for the remainder of 1863.

=== Re-enlistment (1864) ===
The first three-year term of enlistment expired in January 1864. 480 men agreed to re-enlist, a result of over 50% (two-thirds actually) and the regiment changed its name from the 9th New Jersey Volunteer Infantry to the 9th New Jersey Volunteer Veteran Infantry. The men re-enlisted for "three years or the war".

Re-enlistment dates:

- 17 January 1864 – Mustered out at Newark, New Jersey
- 18 January 1864 – Re-enlistment at Newark, New Jersey
- January–February 1864 – 30-day Veteran furloughs

Since over 50% of the men re-enlisted the regiment became known as the 9th New Jersey Veteran Volunteers in January 1864. The regiment joined the Army of the James during the Peninsular Campaign leading to Petersburg, Virginia. 1865 saw the regiment back in North Carolina where they finished the war.

=== Virginia service ===
The regiment reformed at Getty's Station and set sail on 14 April 1864 in a series of movements intended to disguise their true goal. XVIII Corps landed at Bermuda Hundred, Virginia, and took possession of the peninsula. (see also Bermuda Hundred Campaign)

The Star Brigade under General Heckman was ordered toward the Richmond and Petersburg Railroad. On 6 May, the brigade encountered two understrength South Carolina regiments positioned in a sunken road. While outnumbered the Carolinian held ground. General Heckman was wounded and the 9th lost 4 dead and 30 wounded.

On 7 May the Union force moved forward again, slowly pushing the Confederate force back toward the railroad. The 9th suffered an additional 1 killed and 10 wounded.

9 May XVIII and X corps pushed south to Swift Creek, finally able to destroy a portion of the Richmond and Petersburg Railroad. The 9th suffered an additional 1 killed and 9 wounded. Major-General Butler then pulled back to Bermuda Hundred.

==== Drewry's Bluff ====
On 12 May, Butler moved against Drewry's Bluff overlooking the James River. This second battle for Fort Darling at the top of the bluff is officially called the Battle of Proctor's Creek. The battle resulted in 6,000 casualties. XVIII Corps was effectively stopped until Grant and Lee maneuvered their way to Cold Harbor.

The 9th lost more men at Drewry's Bluff than any other engagement of the war.

| | Killed | Wounded | Missing | Subtotal |
|---|---|---|---|---|
| Officers | 2 | 10 | 3 | 15 |
| Enlisted | 16 | 153 | 55 | 224 |
| TOTAL | 18 | 163 | 58 | 239 |

Note: Drewry's Bluff is also spelled Drury's Bluff.

Colonel Zabriskie was wounded in the throat and later died of his wounds on 24 May. The 9th was not engaged in the following days of the battle, except to defend against attack on 20 May.

Brigadier-General Heckman was captured during this battle. General Butler offered to exchange Major-General Walker for Heckman but the offer was rejected. The Richmond Examiner called Heckman's brigade "foot cavalry" when reporting his capture.

The 9th was almost constantly engaged in skirmishes until 29 May when ordered to White House, Virginia, on the Pamunkey River by way of City Point. The regiment then marched to Cold Harbor.

==== Cold Harbor ====
The Battle of Cold Harbor was the last battle of Grant's Overland Campaign. Maj. Gen. William F. "Baldy" Smith's XVIII Corps joined up with Grant's Army of the Potomac at Cold Harbor. The addition of Smith's 16,000 men would extend the Union line. XVIII Corps arrived about 3 o'clock in the afternoon on 3 June 1864.

Second Division under the command of Brig. Gen. John H. Martindale, including the 9th New Jersey, was deployed on the right of Smith's force. The 9th arrived on the field late and was not involved in the bloody Union attacks. The 9th did, however, enter the trenches; the result was 1 enlisted man killed, 1 officer wounded, and 34 enlisted men wounded.

The next several days saw the 9th engaged but not part of any of the costly frontal attacks. By the 12th Grant began the next set of movements that would bring the army to Petersburg. The 9th covered the XVIII Corps withdraw to White House and then Bermuda Hundred.

Upon reaching Bermuda Hundred on 15 June 1864 the nine remaining companies of the 9th plus much reduced 23 Massachusetts were formed into the Provisional Brigade. This was all that was left of Heckman's Star Brigade. The Provisional Brigade was then assigned to X Corps temporarily.

==== Petersburg ====
The 9th marched 35 miles in 12 hours to reach the outskirts of Petersburg in early June. The regiment remained in the muddy trenches and bombproof dugouts until 29 July 1864. Their time in the trenches, however, was anything but dull "sharpshooting and being sharpshot" most of the time.

On 29 July, the 9th moved to provide support for the "Burnside Mine" the next morning. The regiment's exact movements are not known but there was at least one casualty (see below) so they must have been within range of the city defenders.

Known casualties:

- Private John O. Huff, E Company, was wounded in the right hand; thumb amputated; left regiment for hospital

After the Crater, the 9th moved back to the trenches and bombproof dugouts.

=== Back to North Carolina ===
On 25 August 1864 the regiment moved to Point of Rocks where they met the recently released General Heckman. He promised to have them transferred back to North Carolina. With that in mind, the regiment was ordered to North Carolina on 17 September.

On 21 October 1864 the 108 surviving veterans that had not reenlisted left North Carolina for home.

On 7 January 1865 Lieutenant J. Madison Drake rejoined the regiment. Lt. Drake had been captured at Drewry's Bluff but escaped by jumping from a train on its way to South Carolina. He had made it back to Union held territory by moving cross country.

== Deactivation ==
On 12 July 1865 the regiment was mustered out of the army at Goldsborough, North Carolina. The next day the men proceeded by rail to Danville, Virginia. The men then passed through City Point, Baltimore, and Philadelphia to reach Trenton on 18 July. The men were furloughed until the 28th when final discharge papers were issued.

== Battle summary ==
=== Regiment commanders ===
- September 1861 – Colonel Joseph W. Allen, drowned off Hatteras Inlet, NC
- January 1862 – Colonel Charles A. Heckman, promoted
- November 1862 – Colonel Adam Zabriskie, killed at Drury's Bluff
- June 1864 – Colonel James Stewart, Jr., promoted

=== First enlistment ===
The first enlistment was spent entirely in North Carolina as can be seen by the engagements below.

- Burnside Expedition (January–July 1862)
  - 8 February 1862 – Battle of Roanoke Island, North Carolina
  - 14 March 1862 – New Bern, North Carolina
  - 25 April 1862 – Fort Macon, North Carolina – support role
- Foster in North Carolina
- 27 July 1862 – Youngs Cross Roads, North Carolina
  - 2 November 1862 – Rowell's Mills, North Carolina
  - 12 December 1862 – Deep Creek, North Carolina
  - 13 December 1862 – Southwest Creek and before Kinston, North Carolina
  - 14 December 1862 – Kinston, North Carolina
  - 16 December 1862 – Whitehall, North Carolina
  - 17 December 1862 – Goldsborough, North Carolina
  - 6 July 1863 – Comfort Bridget, North Carolina
  - 26 July 1863 – Winston, North Carolina

=== Second enlistment ===
The second enlistment started in Virginia during the drive to Richmond and finished back in North Carolina.

- 7 February 1864 – Deep Creek, Virginia
- 1–2 March 1864 – Deep Creek, Virginia
- 14 April 1864 – Cherry Grove, Virginia
- Overland Campaign (Grant)
  - 6–7 May 1864 – Walthall, Virginia
  - 9–10 May 1864 – Swift Creek, Virginia
  - 12 May 1864 – Drury's Bluff, Virginia
  - 15–16 May 1864 – Drewry's Bluff, Virginia
  - 24 May 1865 – Petersburg, Virginia
  - 3–4 June 1864 – Cold Harbor, Virginia
- 16 June 1864 – Free Bridge, Virginia
- Siege of Petersburg
  - 20 June 1864 – Petersburg, Virginia
  - 25 June 1864 – Petersburg, Virginia
  - 10 July 1864 – Petersburg, Virginia
  - 30 July 1864 – Petersburg, Virginia (Battle of the Crater) – support role
  - 15 August 1864 – Petersburg, Virginia
  - 19 August 1864 – Petersburg, Virginia
- 17 September 1864 – Regiment ordered to North Carolina, possibly at the instigation of the recently exchanged General Heckman (who started with the 9th)
- 9 December 1864 – Gardner's Bridge, North Carolina
- 10 December 1864 – Foster's Bridge, North Carolina
- 11 December 1864 – Butler's Bridge, North Carolina
- 7 March 1865 – Southwest Creek, North Carolina
- 8–10 March 1865, Wise's Fork, North Carolina
- 21 March 1865 – Goldsborough, North Carolina

=== Casualties ===
- Initial enlistment: 1,142 (Bilby reports 1,159)
- Total enlistment: 2,701 (including replacements)
- Losses: 1,646
- Officers & enlisted taken prisoner: ~130
- Officers & enlisted died as POWs: 47

| | Killed | Wounded | Died wounds | Died disease | Subtotal |
|---|---|---|---|---|---|
| Officers | 8 | 23 | | | 31 |
| Enlisted | 61 | 400 | 43 | 100 | 604 |
| Total | 69 | 423 | 43 | 100 | 635 |

== Personal stories ==
=== Hubbs, Ethelbert (2LT) ===
One member of the 9th New Jersey, 2nd Lieutenant Ethelbert Hubbs of Commack, Long Island, New York, chose to retire from the military in September 1863 to accept an appointment as a Special Agent of the Treasury Department, charged with administering the program on "Abandoned Lands and Plantations" in Craven County, North Carolina (The Freedmen's Bureau).

Following his service with the Treasury Department, Hubbs remained in New Bern, North Carolina, for more than twenty years as editor and publisher of The New Bern Daily Times and proprietor of Hubbs & Co, General Store, in partnership with his brother Orlando Hubbs who served as Sheriff of Craven County and later in the United States Congress as Representative of the Eastern District of North Carolina. Both men were prominent in the Republican Party – the "party of Lincoln" – and in the Masonic Order. Ethelbert Hubbs was called to Washington, D.C., in about 1882 to provide testimony to a US Senate Special Committee investigating the rise of the Ku Klux Klan and violence throughout the south following reconstruction. Ethelbert Hubbs died in about 1909 and Orlando Hubbs died in about 1931 at the Hubbs residence in Commack, Long Island, New York. They are buried in the Commack Cemetery in the Hubbs family plot. Lieutenant Ethelbert Hubbs served with B company.

=== Huff, John O. (PVT, Company E) ===
John O. Huff was a 23-year-old farmer from Walpack Township, Sussex County, New Jersey when he enlisted with the 9th New Jersey. He served with Company E throughout the war. John was wounded before Petersburg during the Battle of the Crater on 30 July 1864. The 9th was in position to support Burnside's mine and subsequent attempt to breach the defensive line. A Minié ball struck his right hand.

John was first taken to the regimental surgeon where his right thumb was amputated. He was then transferred to the 18th Arm Corps field (flying) hospital at Broadway Landing. All of this happened on 30 July. The next day John was sent to the General Hospital at Fort Monroe where he remained for several days. The trip from the battlefield to the General Army Hospital took only two days, including the surgery. On 10 August, John was at White Hall, near Bristol, Pennsylvania, in Bucks County. On 15 August, John was transferred to the General Hospital at Philadelphia and on to the General Hospital at Newark on 29 October. By 5 November John was granted a furlough though he returned until his discharge in February 1865. This story shows that medical treatment and transfer could be very quick to move men away from the battlefield. From that point on the Army had an organized set of hospitals to care for the wounded while moving them back to their home state.

John married while on furlough at Christmas 1864 and later removed to Standing Stone Township, Bradford County, Pennsylvania, where he farmed until his death in February 1887. Later pension affidavits indicate he died of an unnamed stomach ailment that plagued him from the war until his death.

== Bibliography ==
- Anderson, Eric (1981). Race and Politics in North Carolina, 1872–1901: The Black Second. Baton Rouge, Louisiana, US and London, UK: Louisiana State University Press. ISBN 978-0-8071-0685-3.
- Baltz, III, Louis J. (1994). The Battle of Cold Harbor 27 May – 13 June 1864. The Virginia Civil War Battles and Leaders Series (2nd ed.). Lynchburg, Virginia, US: H. E. Howard, Inc. p. 282. ISBN 1-56190-060-5.
- Bilby, Joseph G.; Joseph G. Bilby; William C. Goble (1998). "Remember You Are Jerseymen!" A Military History of New Jersey's Troops in the Civil War. Book No. 141 (1st ed.). Hightstown, New Jersey, US: Longstreet House. ISBN 0-944413-54-4.
- Foster, John Y. (1868). New Jersey and the Rebellion: A History of the services of the troops and people of New Jersey in aid of the Union cause. Newark, New Jersey: Martin R. Dennis & Co. OCLC 3036919.

== See also ==
- List of New Jersey Civil War Units
