= Beverly Robertson =

American cavalry officer

Beverly Holcombe Robertson
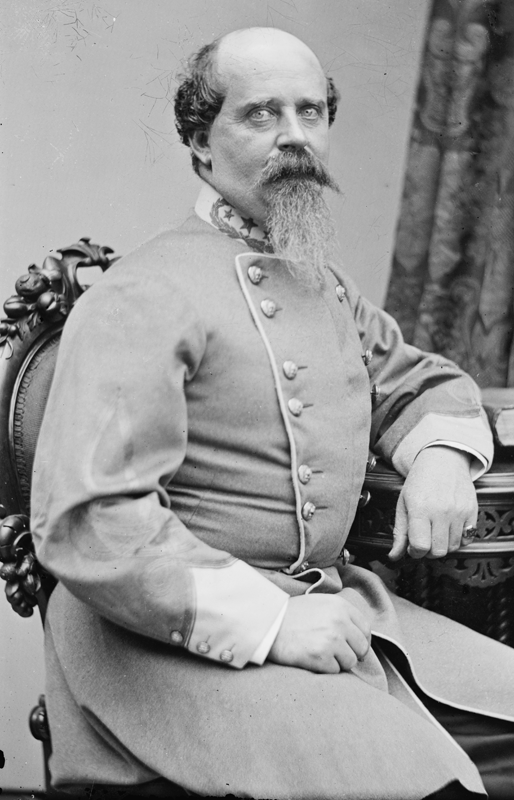
- Portrait of Robertson ca. 1863
- Born: June 5, 1827; Amelia County, Virginia
- Died: December 12, 1910 (aged 83); Washington, D.C.
- Military career
- Allegiance: United States of America; Confederate States of America
- Branch: United States Army; Confederate States Army
- Service years: 1849–1861 (USA); 1861–1865 (CSA)
- Rank: Captain (USA); Brigadier General (CSA)
- Nickname: "Bev"
- Commands: 4th Virginia Cavalry Regiment; Robertson's Cavalry Brigade
- Conflicts: Indian Wars; American Civil War: Northern Virginia Campaign; Maryland Campaign; Battle of White Hall; Gettysburg campaign; Carolinas campaign
- Other work: Insurance Businessman

Beverly Holcombe Robertson (June 5, 1827 – December 12, 1910) was a cavalry officer in the United States Army on the Western frontier and a Confederate States Army general during the American Civil War.

== Early life ==
Robertson was born on a plantation in Amelia County, Virginia. He received an appointment to the United States Military Academy, becoming a cadet in 1845 and graduated in 1849 as 25th out of 43. Assigned to the 2nd U.S. Dragoons as a second lieutenant, he attended the cavalry school at Carlisle Barracks. He then served on the frontier at various outposts in New Mexico Territory, Kansas Territory, and Nebraska Territory, fighting at various times with the Apache and Sioux. At one point Robertson courted Flora Cooke, the daughter of his regimental commander Philip St. George Cooke, but she eventually became the wife of J.E.B. Stuart. In 1855 he married Virginia Neville Johnston, a cousin to Joseph E. Johnston. In the same year Robertson was promoted to first lieutenant. In 1860 he became adjutant of the regiment while serving in Utah Territory, and soon was elevated to acting assistant adjutant general for the Department of Utah. He was promoted to captain in March 1861. However he was report to have pro-Confederate sentiments and when Virginia seceded he decided to follow his home state he tendered his resignation but instead was dismissed from the United States Army.

== Civil War ==
In August 1861, after arriving in the east, he was appointed as Colonel and helped to organize the 4th Virginia Cavalry Regiment but failed to be reelected as regimental Colonel in early 1862. Nonetheless he was promoted to brigadier general on June 9, 1862. He led a brigade of Virginia cavalry in the Second Battle of Bull Run in August 1862, and the early part of the Maryland Campaign in September 1862. Prior to the Battle of Antietam, having a very mixed relation with his superiors, he was relieved of his command and ordered to North Carolina to recruit and train new cavalry regiments. Down there he commanded the Confederate forces at the Battle of White Hall.

After training and sending north several cavalry units, during the Gettysburg campaign Robertson was back with the Army of Northern Virginia. He again commanded a brigade of cavalry, having brought with him the 4th and 5th North Carolina cavalry regiments, under Stuart. At the Battle of Brandy Station his men failed to significantly delay a Union column approaching Brandy Station from the southeast. He fought in Stuart's delaying actions in the Loudoun Valley at Middleburg and Upperville. Due to seniority, for parts of the campaign Robertson directed both his and "Grumble" Jones's brigades. Robertson helped cover Lee's retreat following the Battle of Gettysburg, the brigade having suffered heavy losses during the campaign.

He was assigned in October 1863 to command the Second Subdistrict of the Military District of South Carolina. He helped defend Charleston from enemy attack. Robertson served in the Carolinas campaign and surrendered with Gen. Johnston.

== Postbellum career ==
After the war, Robertson moved to Washington, D.C., and worked in the insurance business for several decades. He is buried in Robertson Cemetery near Scott's Fork, Amelia County, Virginia.

== See also ==
- List of American Civil War generals (Confederate)
