= Time lock =

Type of lock for secure containers

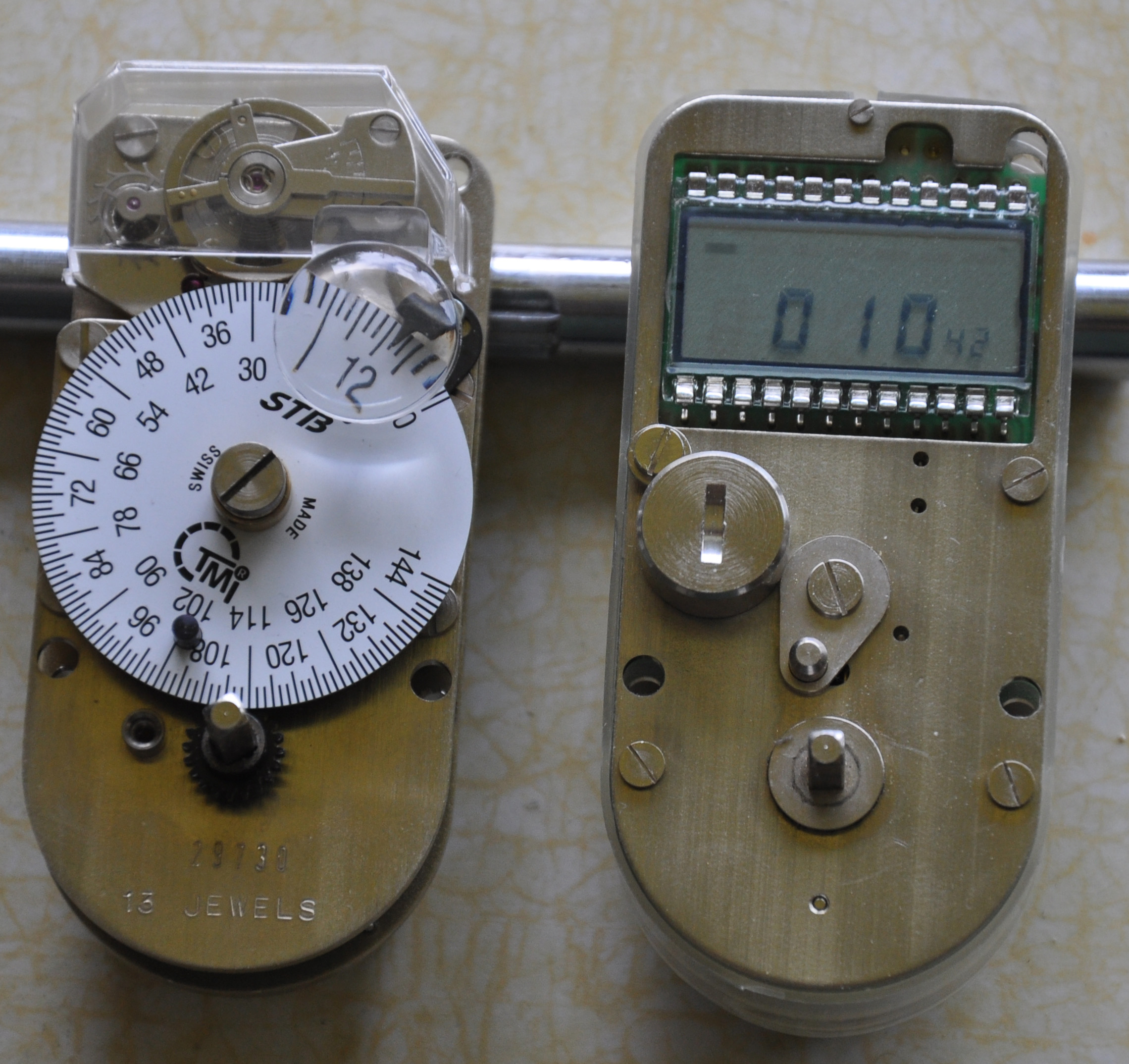
A mechanical and an electronic timelock

A time lock (also timelock) is a part of a locking mechanism commonly found in bank vaults and other high-security containers. The time lock is a timer designed to prevent the opening of the safe or vault until it reaches the preset time, even if the correct lock combination(s) are employed.

Time locks are mounted on the inside of a safe's or vault's door. Usually there are three time locks on a door. The first one to reach 0 will allow access in to the vault; the other two are for backup purposes.

Time locks were originally created to prevent criminals from kidnapping and torturing the person(s) who knows the combination, and then using the extracted information to later burgle the safe or vault, or to stop entry by authorized staff at unauthorized times.

An early test of their effectiveness came on May 29, 1875 in Great Barrington, Massachusetts, when a gang of robbers took the family of banker Frederick N. Deland hostage, demanding that he open the vault of the Grand Mahawie Bank. They were thwarted by a time lock which had been installed only a few days earlier, and left without harming the captives.

Modern electronic time locks have some functions not available to mechanical time locks, like resettable timers and pre-set times to activate.
