= 3rd Massachusetts Cavalry Regiment =

3rd Regiment, Massachusetts Volunteer Cavalry
- Active: June 17, 1863 - October 8, 1865
- Country: United States
- Allegiance: Union
- Branch: Cavalry; Infantry (June 25, 1864 - February 14, 1865)
- Size: Regiment
- Part of: During Valley Campaigns of 1864: 2nd Brigade (Molineux), 3rd Division (Grover), XIX Corps (Emory), Army of the Shenandoah

Commanders
- Colonel: Thomas Edward Chickering
- Colonel: Lorenzo Dow Sargent

Insignia
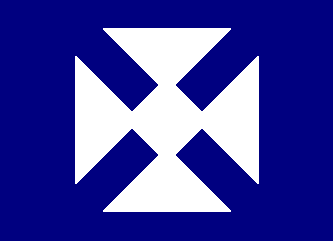
- XIX Corps (2nd Division) badge

The 3rd Massachusetts Volunteer Cavalry Regiment was a cavalry regiment that served in the Union Army during the American Civil War. It was organized by consolidating the 41st Massachusetts Mounted Infantry and the 2nd Battalion Massachusetts Cavalry on June 17, 1863. The regiment served with the XIX Corps, Army of the Gulf during the Red River Campaign in 1864. Its heaviest combat during this campaign took place during the Battle of Sabine Crossroads.

On June 25, 1864, the unit was dismounted and ordered to serve as infantry. They were sent north on July 15 with other units of the XIX Corps to become part of the Army of the Shenandoah and served as infantry in several large battles during the Valley Campaigns of 1864. The regiment took significant casualties during the Third Battle of Winchester and the Battle of Cedar Creek.

In February 1865, the unit was remounted again as cavalry and served in the Shenandoah Valley until the end of the war. The companies that had been the 2nd Battalion reached the end of their term of service in December 1864 and January 1865 and were replaced with two new companies consisting of Massachusetts recruits. The bulk of the regiment that had enlisted as the 41st Massachusetts were mustered out on May 20, 1865. What remained of the regiment took part in the Grand Review of the Armies in Washington, D.C. and then were deployed to Fort Leavenworth, Kansas. After serving in Kansas and Nebraska, they were mustered out on September 28 and returned to Boston.

== Formation ==
The regiment was formed from troops already serving in the field in Louisiana on June 17, 1863 by Special Order No. 144, Department of the Gulf. The 41st Massachusetts retained their original company letter designations during the consolidation. The three companies of the 2nd Battalion Massachusetts Cavalry were assigned to the regiment as Companies L, M, and the third without a letter designation known as "Read's Company." The regiment was attached to 2nd Brigade, 4th Division, XIX Corps, Army of the Gulf.

=== 2nd Battalion Massachusetts Cavalry ===
The 2nd Battalion consisted of three companies recruited and organized during the fall and winter of 1861-1862. The first two companies were recruited in Boston and were initially known as the 1st and 2nd companies of Massachusetts Mounted Rifle Rangers. Cavalry units so named were known for their marksmanship and expected to act as sharpshooters when dismounted. These companies, prior to being organized as a battalion, were also known as the 1st, 2nd, and 3rd Companies Unattached Cavalry. They left Boston together by steamship on January 13, 1862 and arrived at Ship Island in the Gulf of Mexico on February 12, 1862. Here they were officially organized into a battalion by order of Brigadier General John W. Phelps under the command of Capt. S. Tyler Read as acting major. Soon after, the battalion was shipped to New Orleans, Louisiana and became part of the Department of the Gulf. The three companies were assigned to three different brigades and therefore only existed as a battalion by Brig. Gen. Phelps's order on paper. For roughly a year, the three companies were stationed at New Orleans, Baton Rouge, and Plaquemines Parish, Louisiana, mostly performing outpost duty. They participated in the Siege of Port Hudson and other operations in Louisiana, suffering some loss. On June 17, 1863, the battalion was consolidated with the 41st Massachusetts Mounted Infantry to form the 3rd Massachusetts Cavalry.

=== 41st Massachusetts Mounted Infantry ===
The 41st Massachusetts Infantry, later known as the 41st Massachusetts Mounted Infantry, was formed during the fall of 1862 and mustered in under the command of Colonel Thomas E. Chickering. It departed Boston on November 5, 1862 with orders to report for service in the Department of the Gulf. The regiment arrived with other troops at Baton Rouge, Louisiana on December 17, 1862. The regiment remained there for three months on routine duty until March 28, 1863 when it joined the expedition in the Bayou Teche region. During this campaign, on May 11, the regiment acquired horses and were thenceforth known as mounted infantry. After returning from western Louisiana to Port Hudson in June, the 41st Massachusetts was merged with the 2nd Battalion Massachusetts Cavalry to form the 3rd Massachusetts Cavalry under Col. Chickering's command.

== Service ==
The regiment served with the Cavalry Brigade, Department of the Gulf, to July 1863. Defenses of New Orleans to August 1863. Cavalry Brigade, District of Port Hudson, Louisiana, Department of the Gulf, to October 1863. Unattached, Cavalry Division, Department of the Gulf, to January 1864. 4th Brigade, Cavalry Division, Department of the Gulf, to June 1864. 2nd Brigade, 2nd Division, XIX Corps, Department of the Gulf and Army of the Shenandoah, Middle Military Division, to February 1865. Reserve Cavalry Brigade, Army of the Shenandoah, to April 1865. Defenses of Washington, D.C., XXII Corps, to June 1865. Department of Missouri to September 1865.

Men whose enlistments had expired mustered out May 20, 1865. Company L mustered out December 27, 1864, and Company M on January 31, 1865. The 3rd Massachusetts Cavalry mustered out of service on September 28, 1865 and was discharged at Boston, Massachusetts on October 8, 1865.

== Detailed service ==
Siege of Port Hudson, La., June 17-July 9, 1863. Duty at Port Hudson until January 1864, scouting, outpost and patrol duty. Action at Jackson August 3, 1863. Plain's Store November 30. Ordered to New Orleans, La., January 2, 1864. Duty at Carrollton until February 29. March to Berwick and Brashear City February 29-March 10. Red River Campaign March 10-May 22. Advance from Franklin to Alexandria March 14–26. Monett's Ferry and Cloutiersville March 29–30. Natchitoches March 31. Crump's Hill, Piney Woods, April 2. Bayou de Paul, Carroll's Mills, April 8. Sabine Cross Roads April 8. Pleasant Hill April 9. Natchitoches April 19. Monett's Bluff, Cane River Crossing, April 23. Hudnot's Plantation and Alexandria May 1. Mansura May 4. Retreat to Morganza May 13–20. Mansura May 16. Moreauville May 17. Yellow Bayou May 18. Dismounted June 25 and equipped as infantry. Moved from Morganza to New Orleans, La., July 3; then to Fort Monroe, Va., and Washington, D.C., July 15–28. Moved to Monocacy, Md., July 29; then to Harpers Ferry, W. Va., August 4, Sheridan's Shenandoah Valley Campaign August 7-November 28. Battle of Opequan, Winchester, September 19. Fisher's Hill September 22. Battle of Cedar Creek October 19. At Cedar Creek until November 9. At Opequan Creek, near Winchester, until December 25. Moved to Stephenson's Landing, then to Remount Camp, Pleasant Valley, Md., December 25–28, and duty there until February 24, 1865. Again mounted and equipped as cavalry February 15. Moved to Opequan Creek March 8. Scout to Front Royal March 16. Scout to Woodstock April 1. Duty at Cedar Creek, Edinburg, Winchester, and Berryville until April 20. Moved to Washington, D.C., April 20–22, and duty at Fall's Church until May 22. Grand Review of the Armies May 23–24. Duty at Bladensburg and Cloud's Mills until June 14. Moved to St. Louis, Mo., June 14–20; then to Fort Leavenworth, Kansas, June 21–25. Regiment consolidated to six companies July 21. March to Fort Kearney, Neb., July 27-August 16. March to Cottonwood Springs, Colo., August 23–28; then to Fort Kearney August 29-September 1, and to Fort Leavenworth September 8–18.

== Casualties ==
The regiment lost a total of 288 men during service; 5 officers and 101 enlisted men killed or mortally wounded, 2 officers and 180 enlisted men died of disease.

== See also ==
- List of Massachusetts Civil War Units
- Massachusetts in the American Civil War
