= 17th Massachusetts Infantry Regiment =

17th Massachusetts Volunteer Infantry
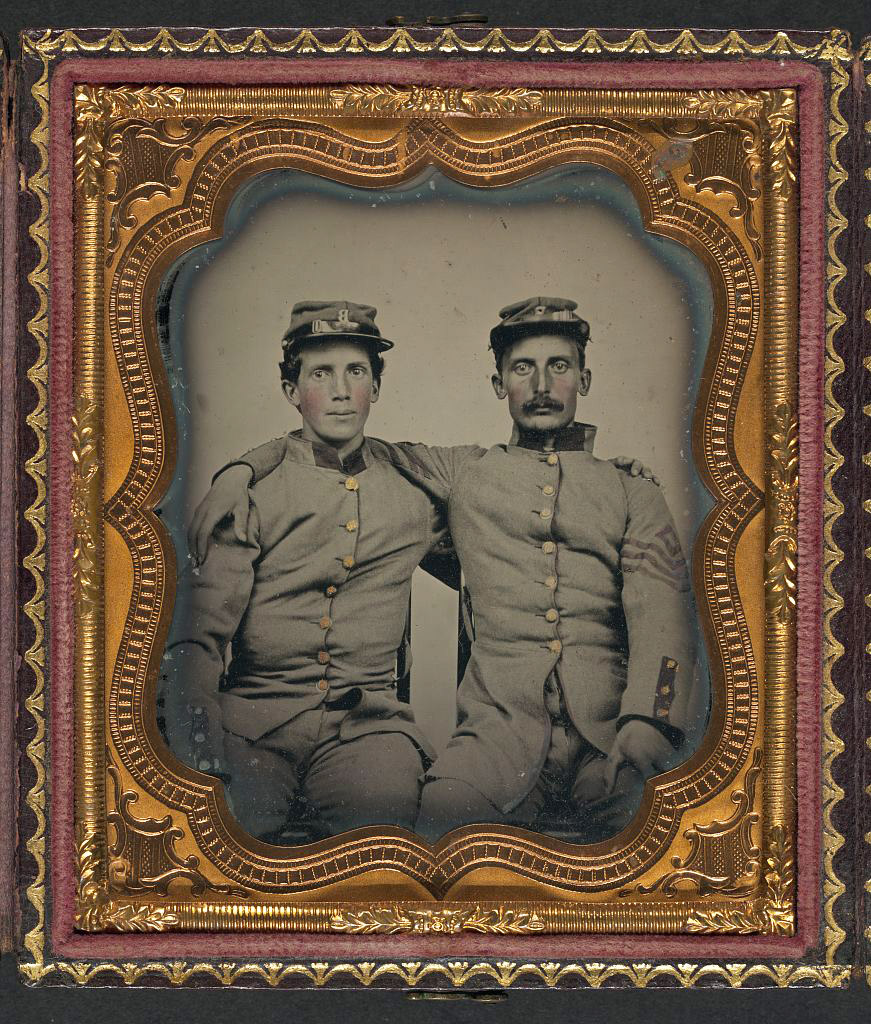
- Brothers Private Henry Luther and First Sergeant Herbert E. Larrabee of Company B, 17th Massachusetts Infantry Regiment
- Active: July 22, 1861 - July 11, 1865
- Country: United States
- Allegiance: Union
- Branch: Infantry
- Engagements: Battle of New Bern; Carolinas campaign Battle of Wyse Fork

Commanders
- Colonel: Thomas J.C. Amory
- Colonel: John F. Fellows
- Lieutenant Colonel: Henry Splaine

Insignia
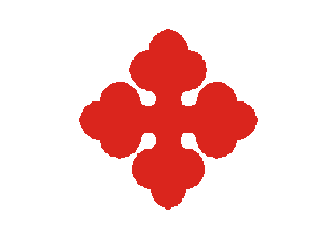
- 1st Division, XVIII Corps

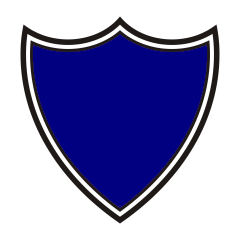
- 3rd Division, XXIII Corps

The 17th Massachusetts was an infantry regiment that served in the Union Army during the American Civil War.

== Service ==
The 17th Massachusetts was organized at Camp Schouler in Lynnfield, Massachusetts (Note: The camp was located in fields next to the South Reading Branch of the Eastern Railroad.) and mustered in for a three-year enlistment on July 22, 1861 under the command of Colonel Thomas J.C. Amory.

=== 1864 Operations ===
Early in 1864 the 17th met with its first serious experience in action. On February 1, an attack was made by the Confederates under MGEN Pickett on the Union outpost at Batchelder's Creek, some eight miles from New Bern, (Note: Union forces had captured New Bern during Ambrose Burnside's North Carolina Expedition in March 1862 and had been under Union control ever since. In 1864 the Union garrison was a brigade-sized force commanded by Brig. Gen. Innis N. Palmer. MGEN George E. Pickett commanding the Rebel army units coordinated an attack against New Bern with a detachment of Confederate Marines and sailors led by Commander John T. Wood. Pickett launched a three-prong attack without success and withdrew in defeat February 4.) and LTC Fellows with 115 members of the five companies located outside the city and a section of artillery set out for the support of the 132nd New York Infantry, then holding the threatened position.

The bridge across the creek had just been carried by the strong force of the enemy when the 17th detachment arrived, and Fellows placed his command to the front and left of the New York regiment. In that position they repelled the Rebels several times. The enemy's overwhelming numbers began to tell as they carried the bridge at Batchelder's Creek and soon crossed over. As the defenders began to run low on ammunition, COL Peter Claassen, commanding the 132nd New York Infantry, ordered his men back into New Bern. He detailed the 17th to provide cover for the battery and the 132nd made their withdrawal. The order was then given to fall back to the crossing of the Trent road to make another stand, but in heavy fog, the Confederates flanked the party and cut off a large portion of them before they could escape. Three had been killed and three severely wounded during the fighting, and 66 were made prisoners, including Fellows, Surgeon Galloupe, and Adjutant Henry A. Cheever — the latter severely wounded.

Those that made good their escape made their way back to New Bern and assisted in manning the works and picketing the approaches while the city was attacked over the next three days.

=== 1865 Operations ===
The 17th Massachusetts mustered out of service on July 11, 1865 at Greensboro, North Carolina.

== Affiliations, battle honors, detailed service, and casualties ==
=== Organizational affiliation ===
Attached to:

- Dix's Command, Baltimore, Maryland, to March 1862.
- Foster's 1st Brigade, Burnside's Expeditionary Corps, to April 1862. 1st Brigade, 1st Division, Department of North Carolina, to December 1862.
- Amory's Brigade, Department of North Carolina, to January 1863. 1st Brigade, 1st Division, XVIII Corps, Department of North Carolina, to July 1863.
- Defenses of New Bern, North Carolina, Department of Virginia and North Carolina, to July 1864.
- Sub-District of Beaufort, North Carolina, Department of Virginia and North Carolina, to January 1865.
- Sub-District of Beaufort, North Carolina, Department of North Carolina, to March 1865.
- 3rd Brigade, 2nd Division, District of Beaufort, North Carolina, Department of North Carolina, to March 1865.
- 1st Brigade, Division District of Beaufort, to April 1865. 3rd Brigade, 3rd Division, XXIII Corps, to July 1865.

=== List of battles ===
The official list of battles in which the regiment bore a part:

- Battle of New Bern
- Carolinas campaign
- Battle of Wyse Fork

=== Detailed service ===
==== 1861 ====
- Left Massachusetts for Washington, D.C., August 23
- Duty at Baltimore, Md., until March 1862.

==== 1862 ====
- Ordered to New Bern, N.C., March 12,
- Duty there until December.
  - Reconnaissance toward Trenton May 15–16.
  - Trenton Bridge May 15.
  - Trenton and Pollocksville Road May 22 (Company I).
  - Expedition to Trenton and Pollocksville July 24–28.
  - Demonstration on New Bern November 11.
  - Foster's Expedition to Goldsboro December 11–20.
  - Kinston December 14.
  - Whitehall December 16.
  - Goldsboro December 17.

==== 1863 ====
- Provost duty at and near New Bern until April 1863.
- March to relief of Washington, N.C., April 7–10.
- Blount's Creek April 9.
- Expedition to Washington April 17–19.
- Expedition toward Kinston April 27-May 1.
- Wise's Cross Roads and Dover Road April 28.
- Expedition to Thenton July 4–8.
- Quaker Bridge July 6.
- Raid on Weldon July 25-August 1.
- Duty at New Bern until February 1864.

==== 1864 ====
- Operations about New Bern against Whiting January 18-February 10, 1864.
- Skirmishes at Beech Creek and Batchelor's Creek February 1–3.
- Expedition to Washington April 18–22. Washington April 27–28.
- Duty at New Bern and vicinity until July 27, and at Newport Barracks until September 23.
- Veterans on furlough until November 10.
- Duty at Newport Barracks November 20, 1864 to March 4, 1865.

==== 1865 ====
- Moved to Core Creek.
- Battle of Wyse Fork March 8–10, 1865.
- Occupation of Kinston March 15.
- Occupation of Goldsboro March 21.
- Advance on Raleigh April 9–14.
- Occupation of Raleigh April 14.
- Duty at Greensboro May 5-July 11.
- Mustered out of service on July 11, 1865 at Greensboro, North Carolina

== Casualties ==
The regiment lost a total of 172 men during service; 21 enlisted men killed or mortally wounded, 4 officers and 147 enlisted men died of disease.

== Commanders ==
- Colonel Thomas J.C. Amory
- Colonel John F. Fellows
- Colonel Henry Splaine - commanded at this rank, but not mustered

== See also ==
- List of Massachusetts Civil War Units
- Massachusetts in the American Civil War
