= Thomas Edward Chickering =

Piano manufacturer and soldier

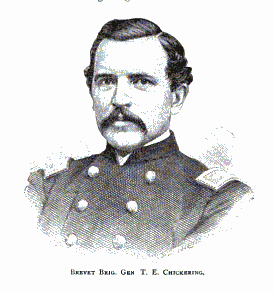
- Born: October 22, 1824; Boston, Massachusetts
- Died: February 14, 1871 (aged 46); Boston, Massachusetts
- Burial place: Mount Auburn Cemetery, Cambridge, Massachusetts
- Military career
- Allegiance: United States of America; Union
- Branch: United States Army; Union Army
- Service years: 1862–1864
- Rank: Colonel
- Commands: 41st Regiment Massachusetts Volunteer Infantry; 3rd Massachusetts Volunteer Cavalry; Army District of Opelousas, Louisiana
- Conflicts: American Civil War
- Awards: Brevet Brigadier General

Thomas Edward Chickering (October 22, 1824 – February 14, 1871) was a piano manufacturer and soldier.

The Chickering and Sons piano manufacturing company was established by Thomas Chickering's father and was among the first and most celebrated piano manufacturers in the United States. Thomas took over administration of the firm from his father in 1853.

In 1862, Chickering became a colonel during the American Civil War, eventually being awarded the honorary grade of brevet brigadier general.

== Early life ==
Chickering was the son of Jonas Chickering, a notable piano manufacturer in Boston. Having established his firm in 1823, Jonas Chickering was among the earliest manufacturers of pianos in the United States and, by the 1830s, Chickering pianos were well known throughout the country.

In 1845, at the age of 21, Thomas Chickering began working with his father in the family firm. He gained not only skills for designing pianos but also cultivated a talent for business and marketing.

Chickering married Caroline Battelle on September 8, 1847, and had at least one child, Lillian Chickering Prince, in 1849.

In December 1852, the firm suffered a setback when their factory burned. The Chickerings constructed a new factory on Tremont Street in Boston in 1853. The same year, Jonas Chickering died and Thomas Chickering and his brothers took over management of the firm at which point the company became known as Chickering and Sons. Thomas Chickering, as the eldest brother, became head of the firm's affairs.

== Civil War service ==
For several years before the Civil War Chickering had been interested in the military and commanded a company, the New England Guards, in the state militia. On September 15, 1862, Chickering was placed in command of the 41st Massachusetts Infantry. The regiment was deployed to New Orleans in November 1862 as part of Major General Nathaniel Banks's Louisiana expedition.

During the winter of 1862–1863, the 41st Massachusetts garrisoned Baton Rouge, Louisiana, without any significant incident. During April and May 1863, the 41st Massachusetts was part of an expedition to Opelousas, Louisiana, to forage for supplies and gather freed slaves by the thousands for recruitment into the Union Army. Chickering was appointed military governor of Opelousas and commanded the Union troops (consisting of seven regiments of infantry) that were part of the expedition.

In June 1863, as Chickering and the 41st Massachusetts prepared to join other troops of the Department of the Gulf in the Siege of Port Hudson, the regiment was consolidated with three companies of Massachusetts cavalry and became a mounted unit. The regiment was renamed the 3rd Massachusetts Volunteer Cavalry. The unit saw action in the Siege of Port Hudson and the Red River Campaign. Chickering commanded this unit until September 1, 1864, when he resigned from the army.

For his service during the war, Chickering was awarded the honorary grade of brevet brigadier general, nominated February 21, 1866, confirmed April 10, 1866, to rank from March 13, 1865.

== Post-war life ==
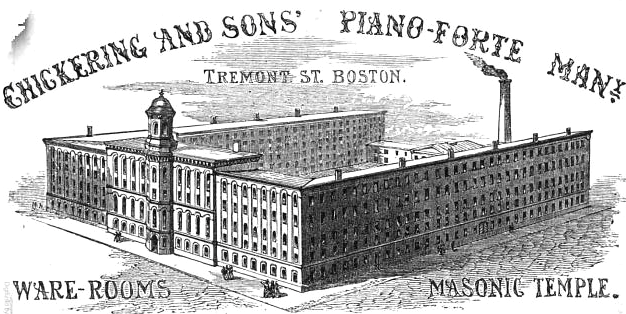
An 1856 lithograph of the Chickering and Sons piano factory in Boston

Following the war, Chickering returned to his career as senior partner of Chickering and Sons. The company continued to expand its reputation through new designs and patents. Chickering pianos were exhibited at the 1867 World Exposition in Paris to much acclaim. For his accomplishments, Chickering was honored in Paris by the award of membership in the Légion d'honneur.

Chickering died in Boston in 1871 at the age of 47.

== Legacy ==
The Chickering and Sons piano company, under the management of Thomas Chickering's younger brother, Frank Chickering, further increased their prestige after opening a showroom in New York City. The firm also built a concert hall, Chickering Hall, in New York in 1875 which hosted concerts by accomplished musicians of the era. The "famous" hall, according to The New York Times, stood on the northwest corner of Fifth Avenue and 18th Street. It was designed by architect George B. Post. The hall was torn down shortly after the firm sold the building in 1901.

== See also ==
- List of Massachusetts generals in the American Civil War
- Massachusetts in the American Civil War
