= Frederick N. Deland =

- Born: Frederick Nelson Deland; December 25, 1843; Sheffield, Massachusetts, US
- Died: August 23, 1922 (aged 78); Pittsfield, Massachusetts, US
- Military career
- Allegiance: United States
- Branch: United States Army; Union Army
- Rank: Private
- Unit: 41st Massachusetts Volunteer Infantry Regiment - Company B
- Awards: Medal of Honor

Frederick Nelson Deland (December 25, 1843 – August 23, 1922) was an American soldier who fought in the American Civil War. Deland received the United States' highest award for bravery during combat, the Medal of Honor, for his action during the siege of Port Hudson in Louisiana on May 27, 1863. He was honored with the award on June 22, 1896.

== Biography ==
Deland was born in Sheffield, Massachusetts, on December 25, 1843. He enlisted in the 41st Massachusetts Volunteer Infantry Regiment. For his action during the siege of Port Hudson in Louisiana on May 27, 1863, he was honored with the Medal of Honor on June 22, 1896.

After the Civil War, Deland worked at the Grand Mahawie Bank in Great Barrington, Massachusetts, first as a clerk, then a cashier, and finally as its president. In 1875, a gang of robbers broke into his house, binding and gagging Deland's parents and sister, and demanding that he come with them to open the bank vault. They were thwarted, however, by a time lock which had been installed on the vault's door only a few days earlier (one of the first such installations in the country). The gang stole some cash and bonds from the house and left Deland and his family bound but unharmed. They were rescued the next day, after his sister was able to signal neighbors through a window.

Frederick N. Deland died in Pittsfield on August 23, 1922.

== Medal of Honor citation ==
Volunteered in response to a call and, under a heavy fire from the enemy, advanced and assisted in filling with fascines a ditch which presented a serious obstacle to the troops attempting to take the works of the enemy by assault.

== See also ==
- List of American Civil War Medal of Honor recipients: A–F
