= Thomas J. C. Amory =

American soldier (1828–1864)

Thomas J.C. Amory
- Born: November 27, 1828; Boston, Massachusetts
- Died: October 7, 1864 (age 35); New Bern, North Carolina
- Military career
- Allegiance: United States of America; Union
- Branch: United States Army; Union Army
- Service years: 1851–1864
- Rank: Colonel; Bvt. Brigadier General
- Unit: 7th U.S. Infantry
- Commands: 17th Massachusetts Regiment; 1st Bde., 1st Div., XVIII Corps; District of Beaufort
- Conflicts: Utah War; American Civil War

Thomas Jonathan Coffin Amory (November 27, 1828 – October 7, 1864) was an officer in the Regular Army of the United States prior to and during the Civil War.

== Early service and Utah War ==
After graduating from West Point in 1851, as 30th out of 42 graduates, Amory received the rank of brevet second lieutenant and was assigned to the 7th U.S. Infantry Regiment. The 7th Infantry served in the American West. In 1857, Amory (by that time a first lieutenant) participated in the Utah War—an armed dispute between the U.S. government and the Mormon settlers in Utah Territory.

== Civil War ==
Early in 1861, Amory returned to Massachusetts from active duty with the Regular Army to act as a recruiting officer. In May 1861, he was promoted to captain in the Regular Army. On September 2, 1861, he was commissioned a colonel of the Massachusetts volunteers by Gov. John Andrew and placed in command of the 17th Regiment Massachusetts Volunteer Infantry.

The 17th Massachusetts was assigned to the Department of North Carolina and shortly after the regiment arrived in North Carolina, Amory was promoted to command the 1st Brigade, 1st Division of the XVIII Corps under the overall command of Maj. Gen. John G. Foster. Early in 1864, he was promoted to the command of the army District of Beaufort, North Carolina. In the fall of 1864, an epidemic of yellow fever swept through Beaufort. Amory and his wife (who had been staying in garrison with him) both fell victim to the epidemic. Amory died in New Bern, North Carolina on October 7, 1864. Amory's wife died a few days before him.

Amory was posthumously awarded the grade of brevet brigadier general. It made retroactively effective to the date of his death; October 7, 1864.

== See also ==
- List of Massachusetts generals in the American Civil War
- Massachusetts in the American Civil War
