= 46th Massachusetts Infantry Regiment =

46th Regiment Massachusetts Volunteer Infantry
- Active: September 22, 1862 – July 28, 1863
- Country: United States
- Allegiance: Union
- Branch: Union Army
- Type: Infantry
- Size: Regiment
- Part of: In 1863: 2nd Brigade, 1st Division, XVIII Corps
- Engagements: American Civil War

The 46th Regiment Massachusetts Volunteer Infantry was a regiment of infantry that served in the Union Army during the American Civil War. Its members volunteered in answer to President Abraham Lincoln's August 1862 call for 300,000 men to serve for nine months. The regiment gathered in Springfield, Massachusetts and consisted almost entirely of men from Hampden County. The primary recruiter was Rev. George Bowler who soon became Colonel in command of the regiment.

The regiment departed Massachusetts on November 5, 1862 for New Bern, North Carolina. There they were assigned to Major General John G. Foster's Department of North Carolina, later designated as the XVIII Corps. In December, the regiment took part in the Goldsborough Expedition. The objective of this maneuver was to disrupt the Confederate supply line along the Wilmington and Weldon Railroad by destroying the Goldsborough Bridge. During this expedition, the regiment was lightly engaged in the Battles of Kinston, White Hall and Goldsborough Bridge.

In March and April 1863, they participated in a skirmish at Deep Gully. In early April, the regiment moved to Plymouth, North Carolina where, for the next month, they participated in patrols and reconnaissance. For most of June 1863 they engaged in the same service while based in New Bern.

On June 22, 1863, with only three weeks left in their term of service, the regiment received orders on short notice to board steamships for Fortress Monroe where they expected to join a campaign in Virginia. However, they were again quickly transferred to Baltimore, reaching the city on July 1, 1863 and moved to the outskirts of the city where they served guard duty for five days. They then boarded train cars to Frederick, Maryland and were assigned to the I Corps and joined other elements of the Army of the Potomac in pursuit of the Confederate army under General Robert E. Lee's as it rapidly withdrew to the banks of the Potomac River in the aftermath of the Battle of Gettysburg. The 46th Massachusetts marched 25 miles in 16 hours to reach Funkstown, Maryland where they were put into position with the I Corps and expected to be part of a large engagement. On July 14, they learned that Lee's army had crossed the Potomac River and that the I Corps was to pursue across the Potomac via a pontoon bridge. Marching to Berlin, now Brunswick, Maryland, the regiment was about to cross into Virginia when they received orders to return to Boston.

The 46th Massachusetts reached Springfield, Massachusetts on July 21 and were mustered out on July 28. The regiment lost one man killed in action and 35 by disease.

== See also ==
- Massachusetts in the Civil War
- List of Massachusetts Civil War units
