= 41st Massachusetts Infantry Regiment =

41st Regiment Massachusetts Volunteer Infantry
- Massachusetts state flag
- Active: November 1, 1862 - June 17, 1863
- Country: United States
- Allegiance: Union
- Branch: Infantry

The 41st Regiment Massachusetts Volunteer Infantry was a three-year infantry regiment that served in the Union Army during the American Civil War. It was recruited as part of Governors Banks' and Andrew's recruitment drives to supply the union with a military force to hold and expand Union control of the lower Mississippi. In the late winter/early spring of 1863, it was converted to mounted infantry and later to cavalry. On its conversion in June 1863 at Port Hudson, it was disestablished and re-established as the 3rd Massachusetts Volunteer Cavalry.

== History ==
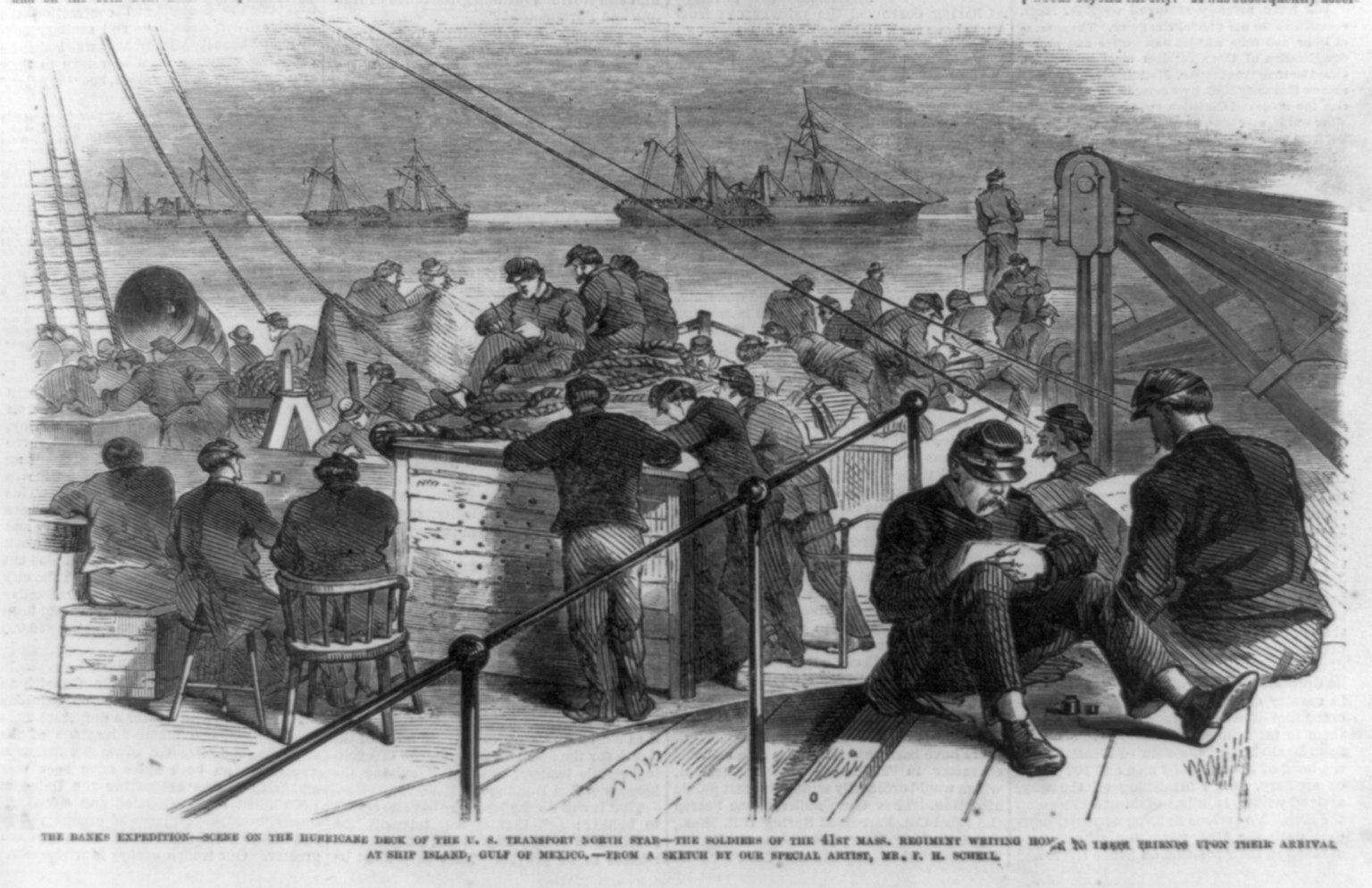
The Banks expedition, scene on the hurricane deck of the U.S. transport North Star-the soldiers of the 41st Mass. Regiment writing home to their friends upon their arrival at Ship Island, December 1862

The 41st was recruited and gathered at Camp Stanton, in Lynnfield. On 5 November 1862 it entrained for New York. The regiment sailed from New York on 4 December 1862 on the SS North Star. Also on board was MGEN Nathaniel Banks. In November 1862, Lincoln gave Banks command of the Army of the Gulf, and asked him to organize a force of 30,000 new recruits, drawn from New York and New England. The North Star was part of this large force bound for New Orleans, Louisiana, to replace Maj. Gen. Benjamin Butler as commander of the Department of the Gulf (Gideon Welles, Secretary of the Navy thought Banks' appointment ill-conceived as he was a less able leader and administrator.

Arriving in New Orleans 15 December, MGEN Banks disembarked, and the troops continued up river to invest Baton Rouge. A preparatory bombardment by the ironclad, USS Essex, cleared the city defenses allowing them to land and occupy the city unopposed. The regiment remained in occupation there until 28 March 1863.

On 28 March, it marched west as part of Kimball's 2nd Brigade, Grover's 4th Division, XIX Corps in the Western Louisiana Campaign and the Siege of Port Hudson. After the Battle of Irish Bend on 14 April, it arrived at Opelousas where it remained until 11 May.During this time, the regiment was converted to mounted infantry with confiscated horse. The brigade was detached from XIX Corps to coordinate the shipment of contraband back to New Orleans.

On 21 May, the brigade set out to Berwick escorting a large wagon train of cotton, sugar, molasses, and freed slaves. The brigade repulsed an attack by Texas cavalry and infantry on the 25th and arrived with its charges and cargo at Berwick on 26 May. On 4 June, it reunited with XIX Corps at Port Hudson where the 41st as mounted infantry was reassigned to COL Grierson's cavalry brigade. By Special Orders, No. 144 on 17 June, the regiment was disestablished and reconstituted as the 3r Regiment, Massachusetts Volunteer Cavalry.

== Notable Members ==
- Private Frederick N. Deland, Company B – Medal of Honor recipient for action during the Siege of Port Hudson, May 27, 1863

== See also ==
- Massachusetts in the Civil War
- 3rd Massachusetts Volunteer Cavalry (1863)
- List of Massachusetts Civil War units
- Siege of Port Hudson
- Battle of Irish Bend
