= Battle of Goldsborough Bridge =

Battle of the American Civil War

Coordinates: 35.3396°N 78.0288°W

- Part of the American Civil War
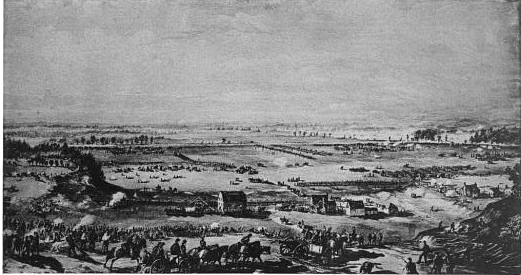
- Battle of Goldsborough
| Date | December 17, 1862 |
| Location | Wayne County, North Carolina |
| Result | Union victory |

Belligerents
| United States (Union) | (Confederate States of America) CSA (Confederacy) |

Commanders and leaders
| John G. Foster | Thomas L. Clingman |

Units involved
| Department of North Carolina, 1st Division * 46th Massachusetts Infantry Regiment | Clingman's Brigade |

Casualties and losses
| 577 | 738 |

The Battle of Goldsborough Bridge took place on December 17, 1862, in Wayne County, North Carolina, as part of the Union expedition to Goldsborough, North Carolina, during the American Civil War.

== Background ==
In December 1862, both the Union Army and Confederate forces desired to secure the strategically significant Wilmington and Weldon Railroad Bridge. On December 17, an expedition under Union Maj. Gen. John G. Foster reached the railroad near Everettsville, aiming to destroy this bridge in order to put an end to the vital supply chain from the port of Wilmington.

== Battle ==
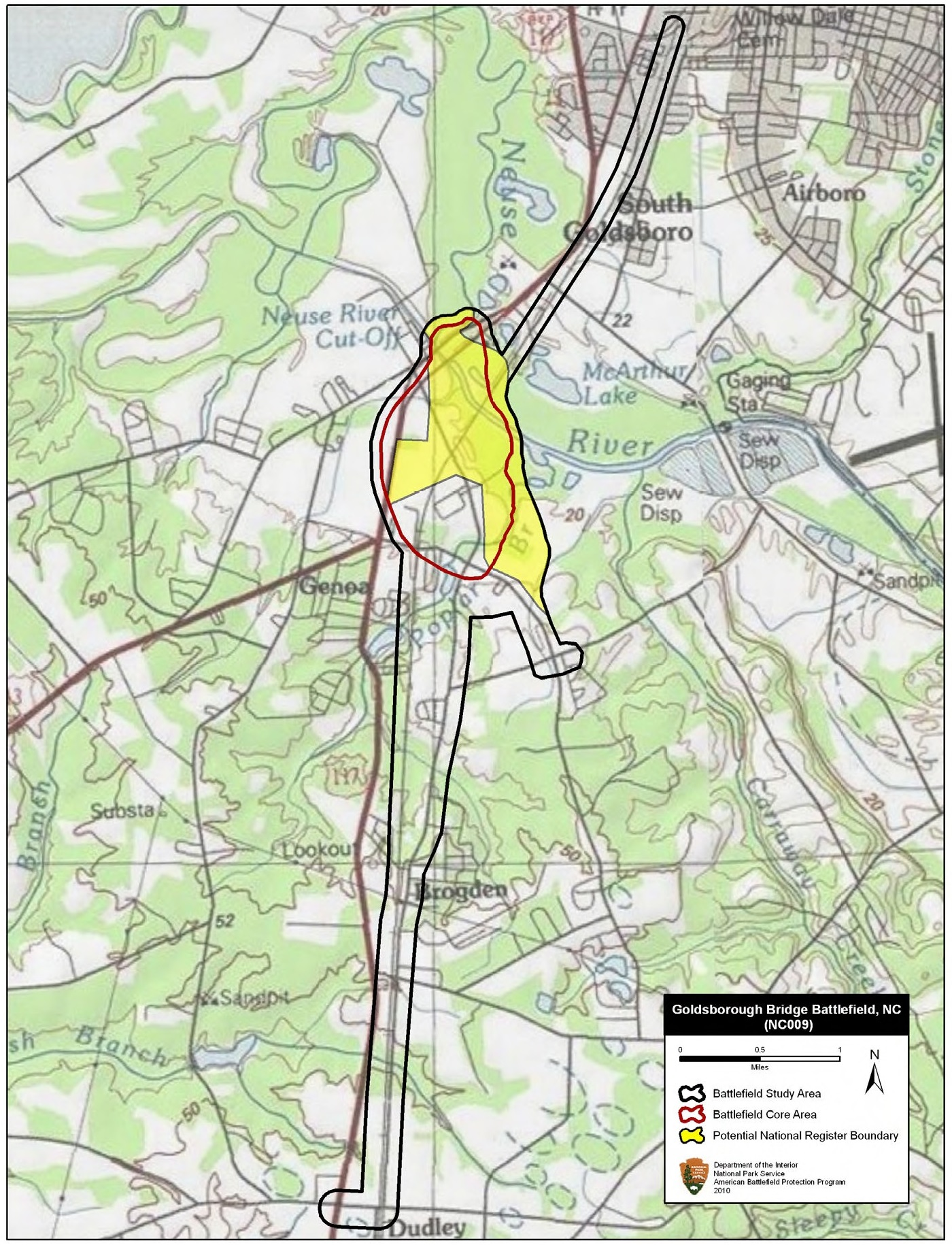
Map of Goldsborough Bridge Battlefield core and study areas by the American Battlefield Protection Program.

Foster's men began destroying the tracks north toward the Goldsborough Bridge. Clingman's Confederate brigade delayed the advance, but was unable to prevent the destruction of the bridge. Foster's troops overpowered the small number of defending Confederate soldiers and successfully burned down the bridge. His mission accomplished, Foster departed to return to their base at New Bern. On their way back, Foster's men were again attacked by Confederate forces, but they repulsed the assault, taking far fewer casualties than the enemy.

== Aftermath ==
Foster arrived at his camp on December 20. Total casualties for the campaign (All three engagements at Kinston, White Hall, and Goldsborough) were: Federal 577 (90 killed, 478 wounded and 9 missing/captured) Confederate casualties were reported at 738 (71 killed, 268 wounded and 400 missing/captured)

== Battlefield preservation ==
The area around the battlefield is currently a public park. The American Battlefield Trust and its partners have acquired and preserved 32 acres of the original battlefield as of early 2025.
