= Cuvier Grover =

Union Army general (1828–1885)

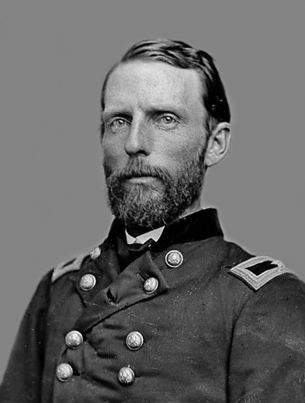
- Cuvier Grover
- Born: July 24, 1828; Bethel, Maine
- Died: June 6, 1885 (aged 56); Atlantic City, New Jersey
- Burial place: West Point Cemetery
- Military career
- Allegiance: United States of America; Union
- Branch: United States Army; Union Army
- Service years: 1850–1885
- Rank: Brigadier General; Brevet Major General
- Commands: 3rd U.S. Cavalry; 1st U.S. Cavalry
- Conflicts: American Civil War

Cuvier Grover (July 24, 1828 – June 6, 1885) was a career officer in the United States Army and a general in the Union Army during the American Civil War.

== Biography ==
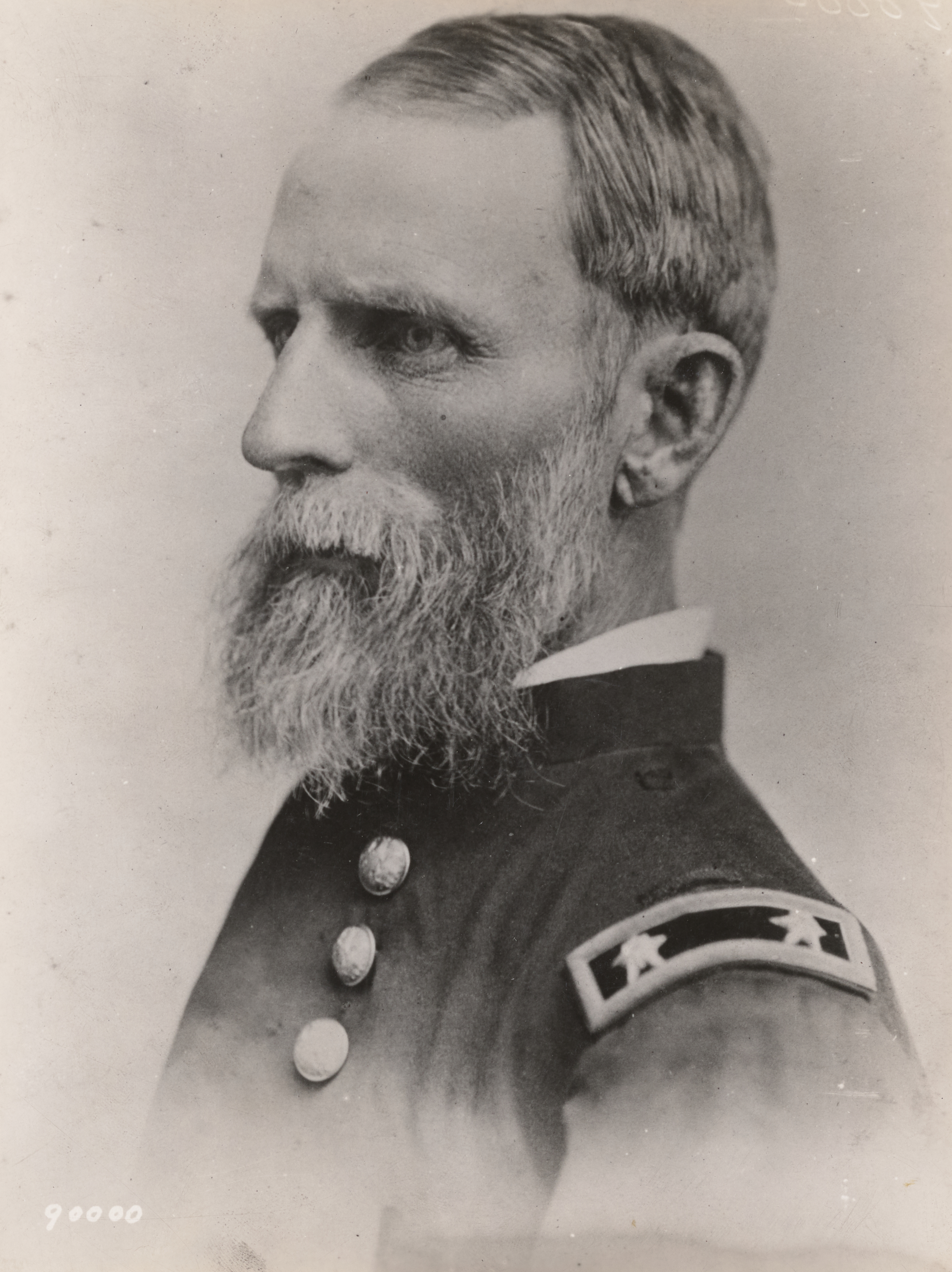
Grover as Colonel of the 1st Cavalry Regiment c. 1875

Grover was born in Bethel, Maine, the younger brother of Governor and Senator La Fayette Grover of Oregon. A graduate of the United States Military Academy in 1850, Grover was stationed in the western frontier before being transferred to help in defense preparations of Washington, D.C., at the outbreak of the Civil War. He was appointed brigadier general of volunteers in April 1862, but with a date of rank of April 14, 1861, the day after the evacuation of Fort Sumter, making him the most senior general in the United States Volunteer Army. He served as a brigade commander in Joseph Hooker's division of Samuel Heintzelman's the III Corps of the Army of the Potomac, in which role he won distinction at the Battle of Williamsburg and was brevetted lieutenant colonel in the regular army, and winning promotion to full colonel for gallantry at the Battle of Seven Pines.

His brigade was cited for bravery in leading a bayonet charge against Confederate forces of Stonewall Jackson at the Second Battle of Bull Run, and immediately following the Union's defeat, Grover briefly commanded a new brigade protecting Washington, D.C.

He was transferred to the Department of the Gulf in December 1862 where he commanded a division in the XIX Corps during the Siege of Port Hudson. Returning to the East in August 1864, he participated in the Third Battle of Winchester, Fisher's Hill, and Cedar Creek, where he was wounded and brevetted to the rank of major general of volunteers. Before the war's end, Grover was brevetted to major general in the regular army on March 13, 1865, before returning to frontier and garrison duty with the U.S. Cavalry.

Grover died in Atlantic City, New Jersey, and is buried in West Point Cemetery.

== See also ==
- List of American Civil War generals (Union)
