= Battle of White Hall =

Battle of the American Civil War

Coordinates: 35.2272°N 77.8464°W

- Part of the American Civil War
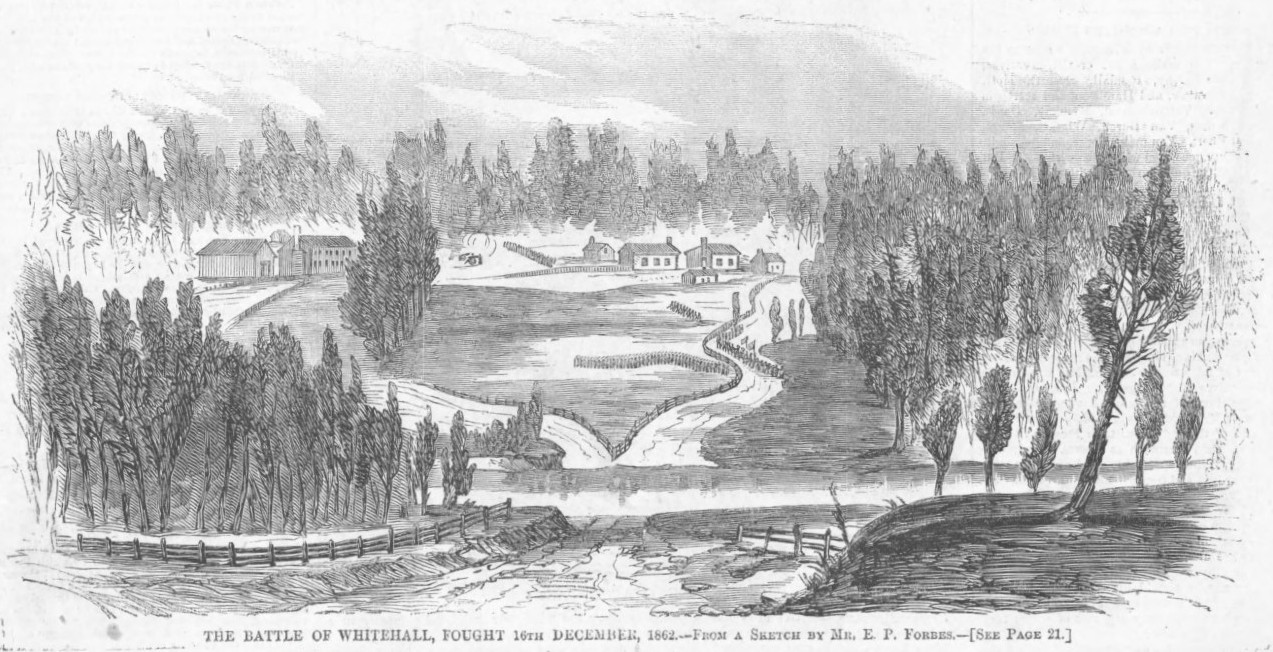
- Battle of Whitehall, fought 16th December 1862 (sketch by E. P. Forbes in Harper's Weekly, 1863)
Date	December 16, 1862
Location	Near White Hall, Wayne County, North Carolina
Result	Draw

Belligerents
United States (Union)	(Confederate States of America) CSA (Confederacy)

Commanders and leaders
John G. Foster; Jeptha Garrard	Beverly Robertson

Units involved
3rd New York Cavalry; 23rd New York Independent Battery; Amory's Brigade; Stevenson's Brigade; 46th Massachusetts Infantry Regiment	Robertson's Brigade

Strength
11,000 (total)	1,500 (total)

Casualties and losses
- 150

The Battle of White Hall, also called the Battle of White Hall Ferry, took place on December 16, 1862, in Wayne County, North Carolina, as part of the Union expedition to Goldsborough, North Carolina, during the American Civil War.

== Battle ==
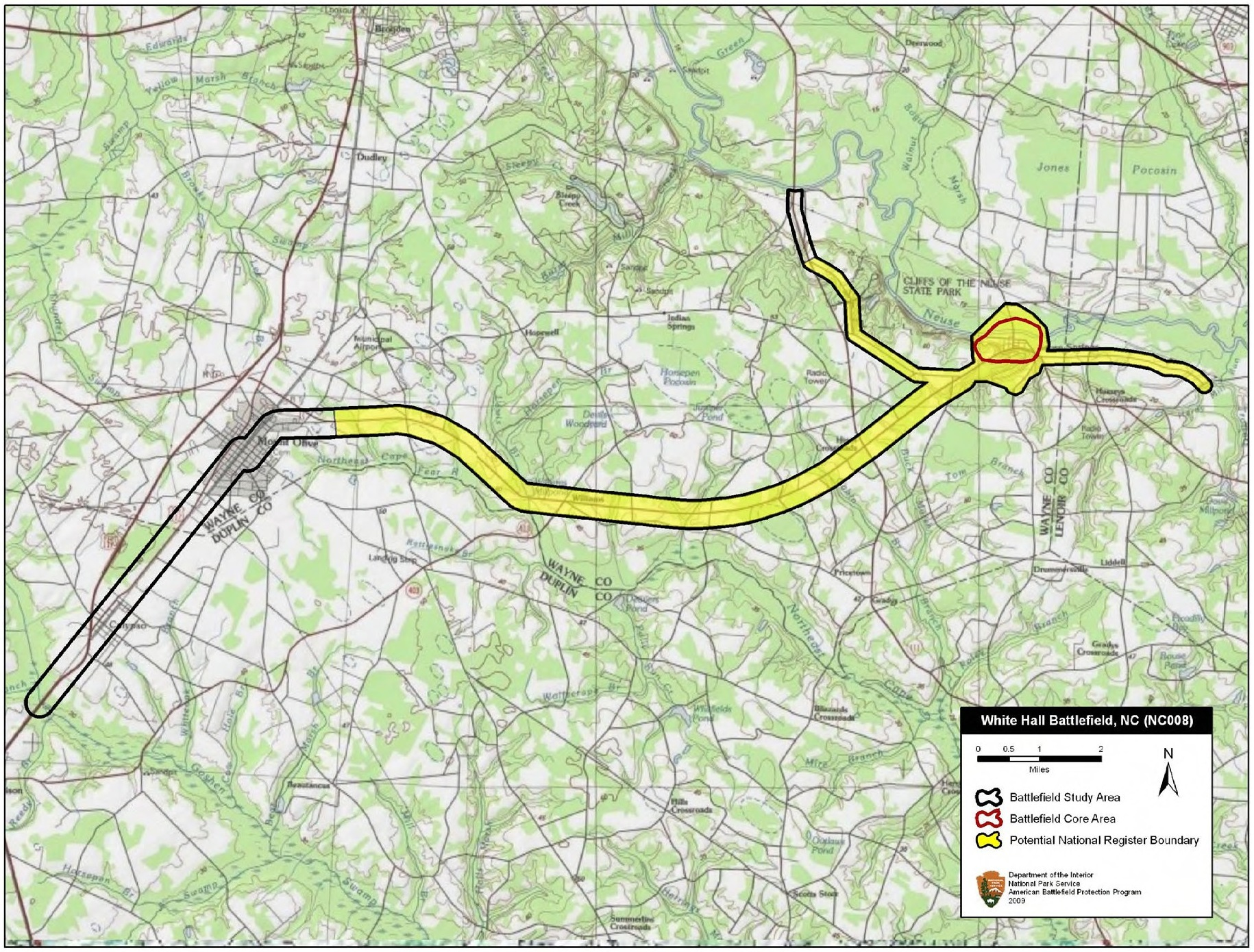
Map of White Hall Battlefield core and study areas by the American Battlefield Protection Program.

On December 15, Brig. Gen. John G. Foster's Union troops reached White Hall where Brig. Gen. Beverly Robertson had taken command of Confederate militia holding the north bank of the Neuse River. There was some skirmishing as the Federals set up several artillery units on a hill overlooking the town and Confederate defenses.

According to the report of the Union commanders, the Federals demonstrated against the Confederates for much of the day on December 16, attempting to fix the Confederates in position, while the main Union column continued toward the railroad, achieving success of the campaign.

Alleged unnamed Local historians dispute this account, claiming that one of the Union objectives of the Goldsborough Campaign (also known as Foster's Raid) was to destroy an ironclad ramming boat that the Confederates were building on the north bank of the Neuse river at that location. This boat, CSS Neuse, was one of several identical boats that were being built in upriver locations throughout the South, their purpose being to break the Union naval blockade. Only one of these boats, the CSS Albemarle, was completed in time to be useful, and succeeded in sinking several Union ships at Plymouth, North Carolina, and opening the port to Confederate shipping.

The Union plan was to take the bridge at Whitehall (present-day Seven Springs), destroy the CSS Neuse, and proceed by shorter route to destroy the rail line at Goldsborough. The Confederates had a superior defensive position, and they burned the bridge to prevent the Union forces from crossing. The Federals spent most of December 16 bombarding the town with artillery fire to destroy the Confederate defenses and to destroy the boat. Meanwhile, Union riflemen fired at the Confederates defending the boat. Local tradition says the Union riflemen were firing high all day, because the south bank of the river (where the Federals were) is actually higher than the north bank, though the river creates an illusion that the banks are even. It is also likely the Confederates suffered less casualties because their position on the bank of the Neuse river was narrow, and so only one regiment could fire at a time and in turn be exposed to fire from the Union soldiers.

Alleged by an unnamed source, Tradition also says that among the Confederate casualties were two free black teenagers, fighting with the local militia.

During the two days of battle, Union artillery heavily damaged the town. The CSS Neuse also took some slight damage, and its construction was delayed several weeks. Tradition says that several civilians took refuge in a stone jailhouse, which was eventually destroyed by cannon fire.

More recent analyses by historians have argued that the Union artillery caused heavy friendly fire casualties and that the casualty lists for the Union regiments were purposely underreported.

Near sundown on December 16, fearing they would be caught between Confederate forces from Kinston and others thought to be marching from Goldsborough, the Federals abandoned their attempt to cross the river at Whitehall and withdrew to the west. They crossed the Neuse River between Whitehall and Mount Olive, and continued on to fight an engagement at Goldsborough.

== Aftermath ==
Both sides claimed victory. The New York Herald published banner headlines announcing the alleged victory, as several New York regiments had taken part. The Union men claimed they had won because they inflicted serious damage on the CSS Neuse, and because the forces resisting the United States were unable to halt the Army's advance. However, the Confederates claim they won, since they inflicted heavier casualties on the attackers than they suffered, prevented the United States from crossing the river, and had kept the gunboat from being totally destroyed.

The CSS Neuse was completed late in the war, but she ran aground on a sandbar before reaching the sea and had to be scuttled to prevent her capture.

== Sources ==
- National Park Service battle description
- CWSAC Report Update
- The War of the Rebellion: a Compilation of Official Service Records
