= Battle of Port Walthall Junction =

Battle of the American Civil War

- Part of the American Civil War
Date	May 6–7, 1864
Location	Chesterfield County, Virginia 37°18′42″N 77°24′10″W
Result	Union victory

Belligerents
United States (Union)	(Confederate States of America) CSA (Confederacy)

Commanders and leaders
Benjamin Butler	Johnson Hagood

Strength
8,000	2,600

Casualties and losses
- 550
- Location within Virginia

The Battle of Port Walthall Junction was fought May 6–7, 1864, between Union and Confederate forces during the Bermuda Hundred Campaign of the American Civil War. Although initially successful, the Confederates were eventually defeated, allowing Union forces to cut a railroad. The Port Walthall Junction on the Richmond-Petersburg Railroad connected with the spur to Port Walthall.

== Battle ==
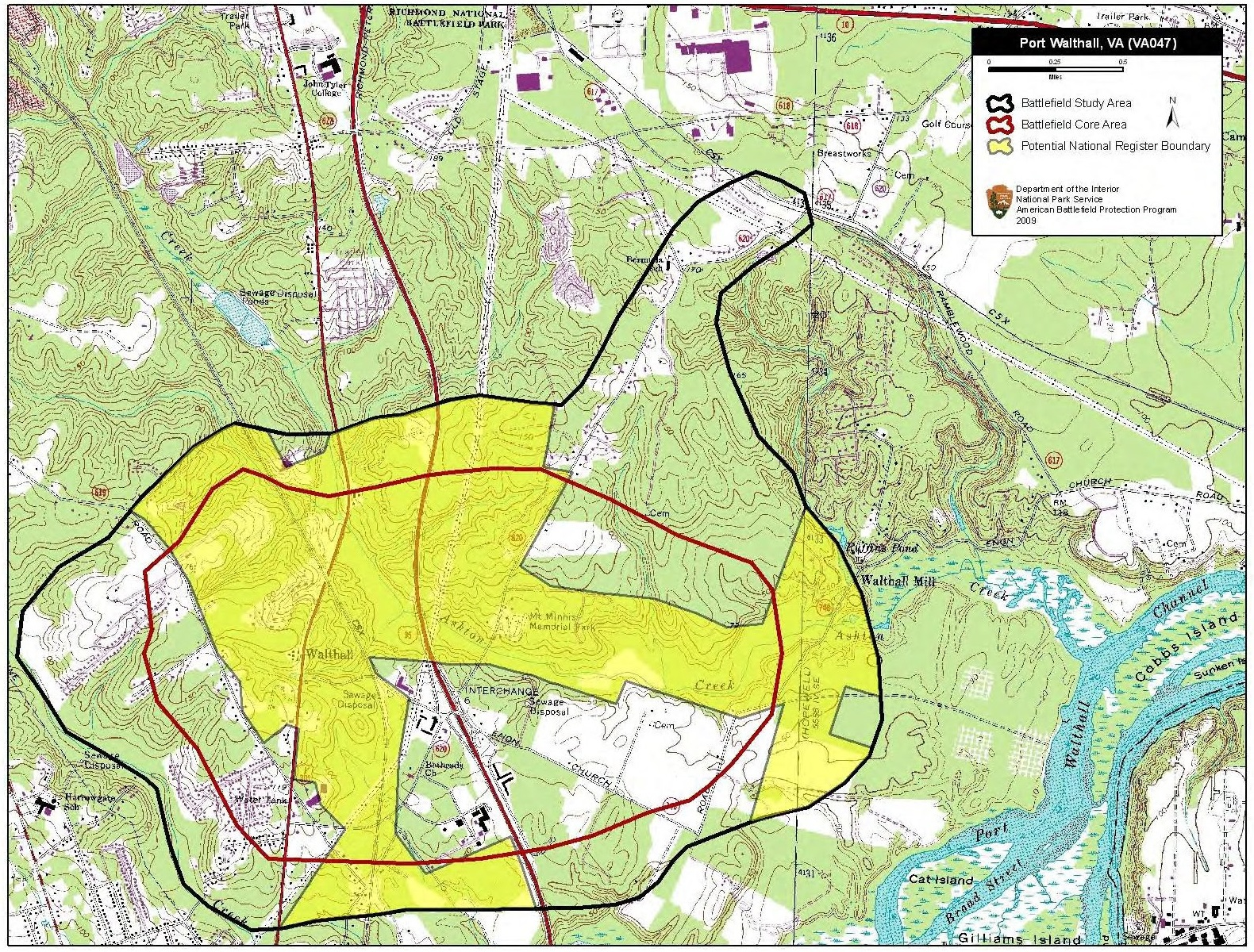
Map of Port Walthall Battlefield core and study areas by the American Battlefield Protection Program.

In conjunction with the opening of Lt. Gen. Ulysses S. Grant's Overland Campaign, Maj. Gen. Benjamin Butler's Army of the James, 33,000 strong, disembarked from transports at Bermuda Hundred on May 5, threatening the Richmond-Petersburg Railroad. On May 6, Confederate Brig. Gen. Johnson Hagood's brigade stopped initial Federal probes at Port Walthall Junction. On May 7, a Union division drove Hagood's and Brig. Gen. Bushrod Johnson's brigades from the depot and cut the railroad at Port Walthall Junction. Confederate defenders retired behind Swift Run Creek and awaited reinforcements.

== Aftermath ==
Union casualties were more than 300, Confederates fewer than 200, primarily from Hagood's brigade.
