= 2nd Massachusetts Infantry Regiment =

2nd Regiment Massachusetts Volunteer Infantry
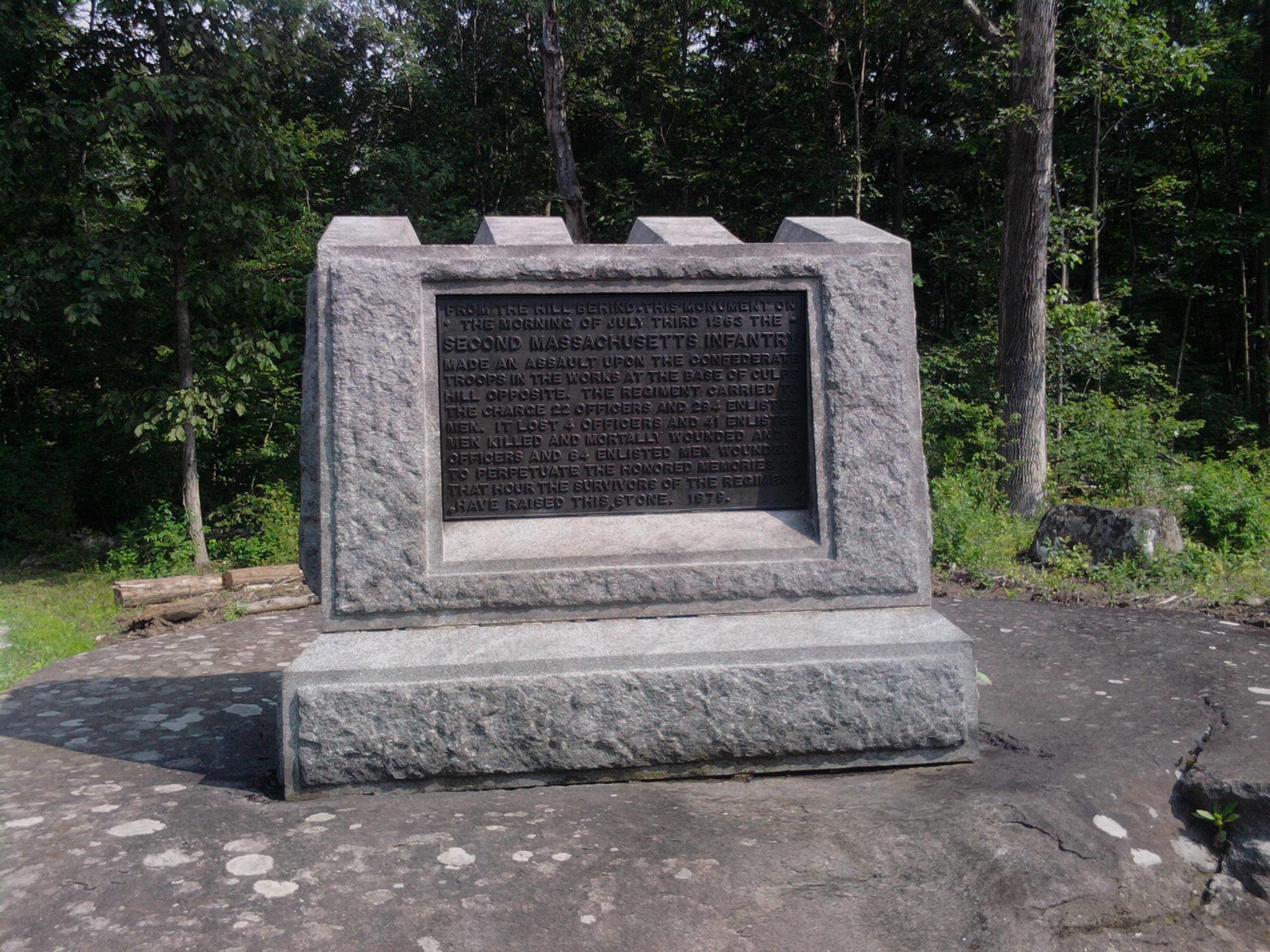
- Monument dedicated to the 2nd Massachusetts Infantry near Spangler's Spring on the Gettyburg Battlefield
- Active: May 25, 1861, to July 26, 1865
- Country: United States of America
- Allegiance: Union
- Branch: Union Army
- Type: Infantry
- Size: 1,687
- Part of: In 1863: 3rd Brigade (Ruger's), 1st Division (Williams's), XII Corps, Army of the Potomac
- Mottos: We carry the flag and keep step to the music of the Union.
- Engagements: First Winchester; Cedar Mountain; Antietam; Chancellorsville; Gettysburg; Wauhatchie; Lookout Mountain; Missionary Ridge; Kennesaw Mountain; Peachtree Creek; Siege of Atlanta; Sherman's March to the Sea

Commanders
- Notable commanders: Col. George H. Gordon; Col. George Leonard Andrews; Col. Samuel Miller Quincy; Col. William Cogswell; Lt. Col. Charles R. Mudge; Lt. Col. Charles Fessenden Morse; Cpt. Robert Gould Shaw

Insignia
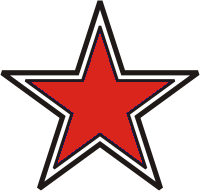
- XII Corps badge (First division)

The 2nd Regiment Massachusetts Volunteer Infantry was an infantry regiment in the Union Army during the American Civil War. Major George H. Gordon (Note: A Charlestown native raised in Framingham, Gordon graduated from West Point in 1846. In the Mexican–American War, he was brevetted to first lieutenant for gallantry at Cerro Gordo. Resigning from the army in 1854, he practiced law in Boston. He served throughout the war ending as a brigadier general in the army at Mobile Bay. After the war he rturned to law and was one of the founders of the Military Historical Society of Massachusetts. He died in Framingham in 1886. For more information, see his Wikipedia article.) (later Brigadier General), a West Point graduate and veteran of the Mexican–American War, organized the unit's recruitment and formation. The 2nd Massachusetts was trained at Camp Andrew in West Roxbury, Massachusetts on the site of the former Transcendentalist utopian community, Brook Farm. Roughly half the regiment was mustered in on May 18, 1861, and the remainder on May 25, 1861, for a term of three years. The regiment saw extensive combat as part of the Army of the Potomac (AoP) particularly during the Battle of Antietam and the Battle of Gettysburg. It later was part of the movement from the AoP to the Army of the Cumberland (AoC) after the defeat at Chickamauga.

== Service ==
=== Organization and early service ===
==== Initial organization and training ====
The 2nd Regiment was the first volunteer organization in the state to begin to take form after the dispatch of the Massachusetts militia to the front in April, 1861. Under the direction of Major George H. Gordon of the United States Army, recruiting offices for the 2nd Massachusetts were opened in Boston immediately after the first group of volunteer regiments departed Massachusetts for Washington on Thursday, April 18. This enthusiasm was quickly dampened and the offices closed due to the fact that Massachusetts had filled its quota and therefore could neither recruit nor send any additional volunteer units until a call was issued by the U.S. War Department. The unit's future second-in-command, Lieutenant Colonel George Leonard Andrews, (Note: Born in Bridgewater, Massachusetts, Andrews graduated first the West Point class of 1851. After graduating, he was assigned to the Army Corps of Engineers and from 1851 to 1854, worked on the construction of Fort Warren in Boston harbor. After a year teaching engineering at the academy, he resigned and worked as a civil engineer until the war. He served through the war ending as a brevet major general. After the war, he stayed briefly in the south before returning to Massachusetts. For ten years he taught languages at West Point and passed away at 70 in 1899 buried with honors and an escort from the Massachusetts militia. For more information, see his Wikipedia article.) made a trip to Washington to meet with Secretary of War Simon Cameron and obtained special permission to recruit a new three-years' regiment and wait until such time as it would be summoned by the federal government.

The welcome permission was telegraphed home, the recruiting offices were re-opened, and others were added in different cities throughout the state, Major Gordon's headquarters being at Boston. To his discretion much-practically everything-concerning the composition of the regiment was entrusted, both men and officers being selected by him. Recruiting proceeded and the regiment began training at Camp Andrew, named in honor of the governor, located at Brook Farm in West Roxbury, on the estate of Rev. James Freeman Clarke. Company A was the first to reach the spot, on Saturday, May 11, and was rapidly followed by other companies and detachments, so that a week later, May 18, four companies and parts of others had been mustered into the national service by Captain Amory of the United States Army. The commissions of the officers began to be issued the following Friday, May 24. There were the usual flag presentations, the first being battle flag on Wednesday, June 26, followed by a state banner the next Monday, July 1. At this time, the regiment was structured in ten companies with a 24-man regimental band. Major Gordon was promoted to Colonel and appointed commanding officer. The regimental staff was led by Lieutenant Colonel, George L. Andrews. The professional Gordon and Andrews commenced a strict, disciplined course of constant drill.

Prominent families were represented by Major Wilder Dwight, Adjutant Charles Wheaton, Jr., and Surgeon Lucius M. Sargent Jr. The companies were recruited from two existing militia company and eight raised new. (Note: Gordon andf his staff initially planned to use Company officers to recruit their own companies, but madfe an exception with the Abbot Grays of Lowell and the Andrew Light Guard of Salem.) Companies B, D, F, G, H, I, and K were from Boston; A was from Lowell, C from Salem, and E from Medway. Company A was from the Abbott Grays of Lowell commanded by Captain Edward G. Abbott; (Note: The 21-year-old, commissioned May 24, 1861, was the eldest son of Josiah Gardner Abbott (November 1, 1814 – June 2, 1891) a politician who served in the Massachusetts General Court and as a member of the United States House of Representatives from Massachusetts. His 19-year-old brother, Henry Livermore Abbott (1842–1864), joined the 20th Massachusetts Volunteer Infantry Regiment, or "Harvard Regiment" with his Harvard classmates. His 18-year-old brother, Fletcher Morton Abbott (1843–1925), was commissioned as a 2nd Lieut. in Company A on November 1, 1861. Edward would die at Cedar Mountain and Henry would die at The Wilderness. Only Fletcher would survive the war and return to Lowell, later graduating from Harvard Medical School.) Company B commanded by Captain Greely S. Curtis; Company C was from the Andrew Light Guard of Salem commanded by Captain William Cogswell; Company D commanded by Captain, James Savage Jr.; Company E commanded by Captain Samuel M. Quincy; Company F commanded by Captain, J. Parker Whitney; (Note: Robert Gould Shaw was this company's second lieutenant.)Company G commanded by Captain Richard Cary; Company H commanded by Captain, Francis H. Tucker; Company I commanded by Captain Adin B. Underwood; (Note: This company's second lieutenant was Rufus Choate, the son of the recently deceased Rufus Choate (October 1, 1799 – July 13, 1859) who was a lawyer, orator, and Whig senator. Through his father, he was second-cousins with George Cheyne Shattuck Choate, Joseph Hodges Choate, and William Gardner Choate, founder of the Choate School.) and Company K commanded by Captain Richard C. Goodwin. A band of 24 members from different towns and cities was led by Charles Speigle of Boston.

==== Initial deployment and service ====
On Saturday, July the well-drilled 2nd Massachusetts received orders to report as soon as possible at Williamsport, MD, as reinforcements of General Patterson. That Monday morning, July 8, the regiment entrained for South Station in Boston, and then took the Boston and Providence and New York, Providence and Boston Railroads to New London, CT, and by New York and Norwich Transportation Company paddlewheel steamers to New York. After the regiment disembarked near Battery Park and marched up Broadway to the armory for the night. The next morning, on the Hudson riverfront, they boarded ferries which took the across the river to Elizabethport, NJ. The 2nd Massachusetts then took the New Jersey Central Railroad across New Jersey and the Pennsylvania Railroad through Pennsylvania to Chambersburg, and then on the Western Maryland Railway (WMRR) to Hagerstown, until on Thursday afternoon, July 11, it reached Williamsport on the Potomac.

Early Friday morning, the regiment forded the river into Virginia and marched to Martinsburg, where it joined Patterson's main body, and was assigned to the 6th Brigade under Patterson's son-in-law Col. Abercrombie. Early Friday morning, the regiment forded the river into Virginia and marched to Martinsburg, where it joined Patterson's main body, and was assigned to the 6th Brigade under Col. Abercrombie. On July 3, Patterson had occupied Martinsburg, but remained inactive until July 15 when he marched to Bunker Hill. Instead of continuing to Winchester, Virginia, Patterson turned east and then retreated to Harpers Ferry. This took pressure off of Brig. Gen. Joseph E. Johnston in the Shenandoah Valley and he was able to march his troops and reinforce the Confederates under P.G.T. Beauregard at the First Battle of Bull Run. (Note: Winfield Scott's series of orders to Patterson had been less than clear and somewhat contradictory. This led to Patterson's failure to hold Johnston in the Valley and prevented him from reinforcing Beauregard. Patterson was widely blamed for the Union loss at Bull Run and defended his Civil War performance in his book, A Narrative of the Campaign in the Valley of the Shenandoah, in 1861, published in 1865. Despite this, Johnston declared that Patterson's army had largely deterred him from pursuing the shattered and disorganized Union troops as they retreated to Washington, D.C. following the battle. After multiple messages encouraging Patterson to attack, Scott replaced Patterson with Nathaniel P. Banks. Patterson was criticized for his failure to contain the Confederate forces. He was honorably discharged and mustered out of the Army on July 27, 1861.) Thursday, the 2nd Massachusetts was sent back to Harpers Ferry and three days later, Patterson learned Johnston had eluded him and gone to Bull Run, he fell back with his whole force. Col. Gordon was made commander of Harpers Ferry, with the regiment as garrison. While the 2nd Massachusetts was in the mill town, the loyal women of the town presented the regiment with a flag, which they had secretly made and kept for such an occasion.

Maj. Gen. Nathaniel P. Banks succeeded Patterson in command of the forces around Harpers Ferry on Thursday July 25, withdrawing to Pleasant Valley on the Maryland side with the few troops that remained after the departure of the three-months' men. Gordon remained in command at Harpers Ferry, with three companies of the 2nd Massachusetts, while the other six companies bivouacked on Maryland Heights securing the artillery there. Soon afterward Banks' command was extended down the Potomac covering the different fords and crossings. The 2nd Massachusetts was relieved on August 20, and marched three days and rejoined the brigade near Hyattstown, MD on Friday, August 23. The 2nd Massachusetts camped nearby at Darnestown for even more drilling, and the brigade remained for about two months. Soon after Gordon took temporary command of the brigade, which at that time consisted of the 12th Massachusetts, 12th and 16th Indiana Infantry Regiments, in addition to the 2nd Massachusetts. Reinforcements soon arrived and necessitated a reorganization, in which the 2nd Massachusetts went to the 3rd Brigade and joined the 5th Connecticut, 9th and 28th New York, 46th Pennsylvania, and Battery A, 1st Rhode Island Light Artillery Regiment.

On Tuesday, October 15, Brig. Gen. Williams took command of the brigade. After several preliminary orders during the following Monday, October 21, one came in the early evening to march immediately 11 miles (18 km) upriver, and the 2nd Massachusetts led the column, which moved rapidly toward Leesburg, meeting on the way survivors from across the river at Ball's Bluff. These men had been defeated on Monday, and the survivors were struggling to escape capture and get back across the Potomac. Before daylight, Tuesday morning, the column had reached Conrad's Ferry, and the regiment manned the riverbank, where during the cloudy day they helped rescue comrades who were still trapped on the opposite side. (Note: Members of the regiment had friends and family among three Bay State regiments involved in the battle, the 15th, 19th, and 20th Massachusetts Infantry. A Company's Capt. Abbott's brother in the 20th Massachusetts was one of the survivors.)In the evening, the regiment was sent to Edwards Ferry to reinforce the brigades covering the withdrawal. During the night, the 2nd Massachusetts marched there. The weather cleared Wednesday morning, and the Rebels realized the U.S. forces had been reinforced and withdrew. The AoP commander, McClellan arrived at Edwards' Ferry to take personal command, and that evening he ordered all forces on the Virginia side of the river at Edwards' Ferry to withdraw. The regiment joined the column and marched back to camp.

==== Winter camp ====
On Saturday, the regiment rejoined back to Abercrombie's brigade now numbered the 1st. On the same day, the entire division went back to Darnestown, and the 2nd Massachusetts encamped after two days' march at Seneca Creek, 3 miles (4.8 km) from the town. For the remainder of the fall, the regiment picketed the upper Potomac and again continuing the constant drilling. The health of the men suffered from malaria due to the mosquito-infested creek, but a change of camp shortly after gave no relief from the disease. Amid the hardships in the camp, the regiment managed to observe Thanksgiving due to the kindness of friends at home and the care the officers took to ensure a "very creditable feast. with proper accompaniment of devotion and recreation, made the day memorable."

The brigade was relieved on Wednesday, December 4, and set out for Frederick, where after three days of marching and waiting, their winter camp, Camp Hicks, was pitched in a pleasant wood where warm huts had been built with fireplaces, four miles east of the city beside the macadamized Baltimore pike, where the winter months passed with very little to break the monotony of camp life, though the proximity of Frederick and the friendliness of the people, as well as the ease of communication with their families and friends back home made the situation agreeable.

On Saturday, January 4, "the very coldest part of the winter," the chain of command ordered the regiment should cook two days' rations and get ready to march. The order came in writing on Sunday, and the 2nd Massachusetts was still on alert to move a week later on January 12. For the remainder of the month, the men kept their two days' rations cooked and in readiness.

=== Operations in 1862 ===
==== The Shenandoah Valley ====
To win the war, the United States needed to defeat the Confederate armies in the field. To win the war, the rebels had to break the will of the Federals to fight. The Shenandoah Valley, between the Blue Ridge Mountains and the Appalachians, figured in both of those war aims and ergo its control was strategically important. Known as the breadbasket of the Confederacy, the Shenandoah Valley provided a route for rebel attacks into Maryland, Washington, and Pennsylvania, thereby cutting the link between Washington and the midwest (Note: In June 1861, then militia Col. Thomas Jackson attacked the B&O contrary to the famous May 23, 1861, Martinsburg raid since revealed to be a postbellum, "Lost Cause" fiction.) — directly attacking the United States' will to fight. Second, any U.S. army entering Virginia could be attacked on its right flank through the many wind gaps across the Blue Ridge. The valley "was rich in grain, cattle, sheep, hogs, and fruit and was in such a prosperous condition that the Rebel army could march itself down and up it, billeting on the inhabitants." which meant that Yankee control of the valley would weaken the rebel armies helping to defeat them. If U.S. forces could reach Staunton in the upper Valley, it could possibly sever the vital Virginia and Tennessee Railroad, which ran from Richmond to the Mississippi River. Because of its strategic importance it was the scene of three major campaigns. The valley, especially in the lower northern section, was also the scene of bitter partisan fighting as the region's inhabitants were deeply divided over loyalties, and Confederate partisan John Mosby and his Rangers frequently operated in the area. Due its strategic importance, the valley saw an ebb and flow between the contesting armies until the last autumn of the war.

Transport of goods from the valley to the east was done via a network of macadamized pikes/turnpikes and rail between the larger towns supported by numerous smaller dirt roads and canals knitting them further. Much of this system had been put in place by Virginia Board of Public Works (VBPW) under the guidance of Claudius Crozet. The main north–south road transportation was the Valley Turnpike, (Note: This now approximates as U.S. Route 11 in the Shenandoah Valley of Virginia. In original sources and current usage,"Up the Valley" in this context refers to movement to higher altitude and indicates a southward direction. This was the Native American tribes' Great Path migratory route between what is now Georgia and Canada. As white settlers began to move up the valley in the eighteenth century, it became known as the "Great Wagon Road.) a public-private venture through the VBPW running 68 miles (109 km) from Martinsburg up through Winchester, Harrisonburg, and ending at Staunton. There were several other macadamized roads, like the Berrryville Pike, running between the larger towns and railroads. Three rail lines were the main east–west routes with B&O in the lower valley, Manassas Gap in the middle/upper, and the Virginia Central in the upper, southern end all connecting to the Valley Pike. The B&O met it at Martinsburg, the Manassas Gap met it at Strasburg after passing through the Blue Ridge Mountains at Manassas Gap at Front Royal, and the Virginia Central met it at Staunton after coming through the mountains in Crozet's Blue Ridge Tunnel.

===== Initial advances =====
This alert status at Camp Hicks, came to an end on Thursday morning, February 27, 1862, when the regiment was ordered to enter Frederick to entrain. The regiment had been on alert 53 days, a testament to its discipline. The regiment took the Baltimore and Ohio Railroad (B&ORR) to Sandy Hook, 3 miles (4.8 km) east of Harpers Ferry on the Maryland side. The men marched upstream and crossed a pontoon bridge into the mill town and found quarters in some of the deserted dwellings that afternoon.

Company F was detailed for provost duty and Lieut. Col. Andrews was made the base's provost marshal. On the following day, Friday, the 2nd Massachusetts received orders to reconnoiter Charles Town, 7 miles (11 km) to the west-southwest, and the regiment entered that historic town to the music of "John Brown." McClellan at once ordered a permanent occupation of the place, and the following Sunday, the regiment held religions services in the courthouse where John Brown had been condemned to death, the chaplain occupying the seat used by the judge in the trial.

Banks's army began threatening Jackson at Winchester, in the Shenandoah Valley, on Sunday, March 9; Jackson's remained confident and his troops were in "excellent spirits," The 2nd Massachusetts moved toward the valley via Berryville, 12 miles (19 km) where they met the macadamized Berryville Pike running 12 miles (19 km) west into Winchester, which the regiment "with the usual contradictory orders, countermarches, and skirmishes", soon headed for. On arrival, Wednesday, March 12, Banks' men found that the Confederates had retreated to the west, leaving Winchester's fortifications unmanned. The 2nd Massachusetts remained there some ten days.

While serving as an independent command in the Shenandoah Valley, Banks' division technically belonged to McClellan. On March 14, President Lincoln ordered McClellan to form all troops in his department into corps making Banks commander, in charge of his own former division, now under Williams, and the division of Brig. Gen Shields, to comprise the V Corps of the AoP. In this reorganization, the 2nd Massachusetts At this time another reorganization of the division took place, the regiment transferred to the 3rd Brigade in Williams' Division, of which Colonel Gordon took command and Lieut. Col. Andrews took over the regiment. The other regiments in the brigade were the 27th Indiana, 29th Pennsylvania, and 3rd Wisconsin.

On Thursday, March 20, Williams' Division was ordered toward Washington, and two days later arched as far as Snicker's Ferry, where a broken-down ponton bridge prevented their crossing. While waiting for it to be repaired the regiment was ordered back toward Winchester on account of renewed activity on the part of the enemy, reaching that place on Monday, March 24, after a sharp march, to find that Shields had driven off Jackson's threatening forces at the First Battle of Kernstown on Sunday.

Banks was ordered to pursue Jackson up the valley, to prevent him from reinforcing Rebels defending Richmond. Tuesday evening Williams' Division joined the pursuit. The 2nd Massachusetts went as far as Strasburg 16 miles (26 km) down the pike where Banks called off the pursuit while supply problems were addressed. For the next three days the Union forces advanced slowly while Jackson retreated to Mount Jackson.

On Wednesday, April 1, Banks lunged forward, up the valley (or south), and the regiment led the 3rd Brigade's column (Note: Gordon had the 2nd Massachusetts at the head of his column with five of its companies deployed as skirmishers, commanded by Andrews, accompanied by two squadrons the 1st Michigan Cavalry led by Col. Brodhead. In the van of the column were the remaining 2nd Massachusetts, Battery M, 1st New York Light Artillery, with 10-pounder Parrott rifled guns, commanded by Capt. Cothran; the 29th Pennsylvania under Col. Murphy and the 3rd Wisconsin under Col. Ruger. The 27th Indiana was the rearguard but had yet to catch up to the brigade.) in a running fight with Jackson's troops, a further 16.5 miles (26.6 km) up the Valley Turnpike. Gordon reported by a battery of three 10-pounder and one 24-pounder rifled guns, which halted his column's progress three times. Capt. Cochran, in every instance, succeeded without much difficulty in silencing and dislodging them, at times forcing them to temporarily abandon their pieces and take cover. The final halt was at Edinburg while the 2nd Massachusetts and 1st Michigan skirmishers were moving into the town. The Rebels took position on a rise covered by a small wood, and opened fire on the advancing U.S. forces. Taking position on a hill overlooking the town from the north, Cochrane's battery silenced the rebel battery within a half-hour. At Edinburg, the Rebels halted the 2nd Massachusetts and its following brethren by destroying the bridge over Stony Creek a large tributary of the North Fork of the Shenandoah River.

The next morning, the Rebel artillery bombarded The 2nd Massachusetts and its brigade in the morning and again the New York artillerymen's counter-battery fire drove them from their positions. (Note: In his report, Cochrane reported the Rebels' use of an imported percussion shells, few of which exploded. Further investigation of one revealed that no percussion caps had been inserted resulting in no explosion of the shell. Whether the omission was accidental due to inexperience or intentional, remained unknownm, but the men of the 2nd Massachusetts and the 3rd Brigade benefited.) For the next two weeks, the men in the 2nd Massachusetts and the others in Banks' V Corps watched the Confederates across the river between them, while Banks' staff completed preparations for another advance against Jackson were completed. Jackson took up a new position at Rude's Hill near Mount Jackson and New Market.

Banks advanced again on April 16, surprising Ashby's cavalry by fording Stony Creek at a place they had neglected to picket, capturing 60 of the horsemen, while the remainder of Ashby's command fought their way back to Jackson's position on Rude's Hill. On Thursday, April 17, Banks sent the 2nd Massachusetts and its brigade to fall upon the Confederate left flank. The attack caused Jackson's men to retreat and a Gordon, with the 2nd Massachusetts in the lead, followed, across the North fork of the Shenandoah and through Newmarket. Jackson assumed that Banks had been reinforced, so he withdrew quickly up the Valley to Harrisonburg on April 18. On Saturday, April 19, his men marched 20 miles (32 km) east out of the valley to Swift Run Gap. Banks occupied New Market and crossed Massanutten Mountain to seize the bridges across the South Fork in the Luray Valley, once again besting Ashby's cavalry, who failed to destroy the bridges in time. From that point, the regiment advanced on April 25, to near Harrisonburg, where the enemy were reported, but a reconnaissance of 11 miles (18 km) two days later, Sunday, April 27, showed the Confederates were gone. Banks now controlled the valley as far south as Harrisonburg.

Banks' report on the loss of contact and the vulnerability of his supply line, however, elicited a concerned reaction from Lincoln who recalled them to Strasburg, at the northern end. On Sunday evening, May 4, the regiment marched a short distance north on the evening of and the following day retreated to Newmarket. At midnight they were aroused to climb the Massanutten range on false information, returning to camp after two days passed on the eastern slope, finally reaching Strasburg on Tuesday, May 13.

Although Banks was aware of Jackson's location, he misinterpreted Jackson's intent and thought that he was heading east to aid Richmond. Without clear direction from Washington as to his next objective, Banks proposed his force also be sent east of the Blue Ridge, telling his superiors that "such [an] order would electrify our force." Instead, Lincoln decided to detach Shield's division and transfer it to Maj. Gen. Irvin McDowell at Fredericksburg, leaving Banks in the Valley with only a Williams' division.

===== Jackson's counterstroke =====
At Strasburg, the Manassas Gap Railroad met another macadamized road, the Winchester-Front Royal Pike, that ran 18 miles (29 km) along the eastern side of the valley and met Valley Pike at Winchester. Heading north, or down the valley, Valley Pike passed over Cedar Creek down to Middletown, 3 miles (4.8 km) further to Newtown (present day Stephens City), and finally 7 miles (11 km) into Winchester where it met Winchester-Front Royal road. Several dirt roads ran between these to paved roads on either side of the valley. Banks' reduced V Corps got to know the lay of the land during patrols and fatigues in the upper Shenandoah Valley in the next couple of weeks. They learned who the Unionists were and where the back roads went.

Shield's departure had stripped V Corps of men and artillery so that the force of 23,000 on May 1, was down to 9,000 by Wednesday, May 21. Soon, Banks started getting intelligence from the local Unionists and black population that Jackson's corps of 17,000 men, fresh from beating Frémont's at McDowell was heading his way Since Jackson was now positioned to block him from joining with Fremont, Banks began wondering if his now reduced force, at that time, of the Confederate approach, of about 6,500 men in Strasburg, about 1,000 in Front Royal, led by Col. Kenly.and 1,000 in Winchester. Jackson did not know the exact Union strengths, but was aware that the force at Front Royal, on the east side of the valley, was weaker than that at Strasburg. Front Royal and Strasburg were separated by about 12 miles (19 km) on the more direct railroad route, although longer paths existed on roads.

====== Indications ======
On May 23, Banks received reports of Jackson attacking the garrison getting word that Kenly was wounded before the telegraph link was severed. He fired off telegrams to Stanton keeping the Secretary updated on intelligence on the Front Royal attack. Upon receiving indications of a disaster, but still ignorant of its completeness, Banks sent the 3rd Wisconsin, some cavalry, and a section of artillery south on the Valley Turnpike but, between 8:00 and 9:00 p.m., he told them halt where they would avoid any risk of being cut off. Fugitives had streamed into Banks' headquarters and gave fuller account of Front Royal and built the picture that Jackson was moving towards Winchester, 18 miles (29 km) north on the turnpike. Strasburg and on the direct road to the Potomac.

He had continued wiring Washington with updates until early morning when he decided his outnumbered force's best option was to begin withdrawing to Winchester taking the Valley Turnpike so that he could take as much of his supply train with him as possible. In the night, therefore, the wagons were loaded, and the men put under arms, while scouts explored the roads leading from Front Royal to Winchester. These parties found Jackson held each road and was hastening to Winchester to cut off and capture the whole force. By 3:00 a.m., on May 24 the twelve-mile-long column of Banks' wagons began to roll north down the Valley Turnpike to Winchester, while Banks remained in Strasburg to get his force on the road.

At dawn, Banks wired Secretary Stanton when he confirmed that Jackson's 17,000 had completely routed the garrison at Front Royal "with considerable loss in killed, wounded, and prisoners". and were closing on him, turning his position. Under these circumstances, Banks knew he was basically in a race to reach Winchester, preserve his lines of communication, and increase the odds of reinforcement before contact. He soon found from scouts that Jackson had pulled back to consolidate his force at Front Royal, and Banks wired a flurry of messages to Washington, and was told to remain at Strasburg and reinforcements were on the way. When McDowell, who was then opposite Fredericksburg, told Washington, "I am entirely beyond helping distance of General Banks It will take a week or ten days to get to the valley," Washington reversed their decision and told Banks to head north, "to move at once towards Middletown, taking such steps to oppose the enemy (reported to be on the road between Front Royal and Middletown) a to General Williams may seem proper ....Cothran's Battery i on the hill behind us, awaiting your order-."

====== Retreat and First Winchester ======
At dawn, Banks had pushed cavalry push patrols to south to Woodstock, east along Manassas Gap Railroad, and across the fields to the Winchester-Front Royal Pike. He also tasked his cavalry commander, Hatch, to round up any stragglers and put to torch any supplies of military value that could not be carried off. He then joined his retreat north along the Valley Pike. When he did not hear from his scouts from the east of the valley, in "one of the smartest moves he made all day", Banks erred on the side of caution, and sent further scouts, elements of the 1st Maine and 1st Vermont Cavalry, north to Newtown to turn east down Chapel Road until they met, identified, and observed any Rebels. Feeling a bit more secure, at 09:00, Banks ordered the last of his wagon train to begin the 20-mile trek to Winchester. (Note: Alongside the nearly 8,00 men in his command, Banks had almost 4,000 civilians following his army. Overwhelmingly composed of Black residents who had taken their own freedom, it also included white Unionists from the valley who had been driven from their homes by their secessionist neighbors with nothing but the proverbial clothes on their backs.) The reinforcements to Kenlv had been recalled; the advance guard (southward) called in; and about 10:00 a.m., his last infantry was on the road, racing to reach Winchester before Jackson, who was on the road from Front Royal to that place.

The 3rd Brigade were among the troops preceding the trains; but at Newtown, just after Banks and the headquarters element had cleared the town, and just as the last wagons were crossing Cedar Creek, the Rebels appeared among the wagons, cutting off a considerable number. The 2nd Massachusetts and the rest of the brigade were sent back to reopen the way. Andrews and the regiment returned and drove the Confederates back off the Pike. Companies A and C deployed as skirmishers, and held the road open for some hours. Col. Andrews then burned any wagons that lacked horses, and at twilight, after continued the retreat, which was done slowly in column by platoons with skirmishers on either flank. The Ashby's Rebel cavalry followed closely and twice attacked the column, first by the light of the burning wagons a short distance from the town, and afterwards at Bartonsville, some miles beyond. The three or four companies of the 2nd Massachusetts forming the rear guard of the column and skirmishers and rebuffed these Rebel attacks. At Kernstown, Andrews halted, and the wounded of the regiment gathered in one of the houses, because no ambulances could not be obtained. (Note: Surgeon Leland, and the wounded, were taken prisoner at this house as the regiment pulled back platoon by platoon.) Jackson's men attacked again, this time infantry, and the 2nd Massachusetts began a fighting withdrawal back to Winchester, which was reached at 1:00 a.m. As ther fighting had finally ceased, despite skirmishing which continued through the rest of the night, the 2nd Massachusetts lay down in a field outside the town until daybreak, when the enemy again appeared in force. Banks immediately formed his line of battle with 3rd Brigade facing south on the right side of the Pike, the regiment on the right flank,

During the night, the advance of Maj. Gen. Richard S. Ewell's division (four brigades) reached Buffalo Lick. Jackson moved three of Ewell's brigades to the left to participate in the advance on the Valley pike, leaving Ewell with just one brigade and a regiment. In conjunction with Ewell's advance on the Front Royal Pike, Jackson advanced on the Valley Pike at early dawn in a heavy fog over a hill to the left of the pike, driving off the Banks' skirmishers who held it. Jackson quickly placed a section of artillery on the hill to engage Union artillery on Bower's Hill at a range of less than half a mile. In response, Andrews sent Companies D and G forward, under Capts. Cary and Savage, to a stonewall along Abrams Creek, and they began picking off the Rebel artillerymen.

This face-off continued for two hours. Jackson then brought up the remainder of his brigades to flank Banks' right. Despite numerous officers being wounded, Jackson's forces marched under fire to a position overlapping the Union right. Banks shifted reinforcements to his right, but after a volley or two, they broke. The 2nd Massachusetts was then exposed to a heavy flank fire; but withstood it.

Jackson then attacked Bower's Hill in the center. The Confederate assault, led by the Stonewall Brigade, swept irresistibly forward over the crest in the face of the 2nd Massachusetts and its brigade's determined resistance. With three enemy brigades in its front and three coming at its right flank, Banks gave Gordon permission to withdraw just as 3rd Brigade's position was becoming dire,

The regiment retired through Winchester, "in perfect order, the regiment moving down the slope by the right of companies to the rear under a hot fire." Passing through Winchester, under a fire from the houses of the secessionist citizens, it took the road to Martinsburg, in rear of the brigade, and continued to the Potomac opposite Williamsport. At daybreak the next morning the Companies A (Abbott), E (Quincy), H(Williams), and K (Goodwin), with three from the 3rd Wisconsin, and a section of Cothran's New York Battery, were sent as a rear guard to hold the approach to the river until the rest of the troops and trains had crossed. And here they remained for three days, until the last wagon had crossed and the whole corps were quietly in camp, when they were relieved and allowed to rejoin their regiments on the Maryland shore,

====== In defeat ======
Confederate pursuit was lethargic, as the troops were exhausted from the non-stop marching of the previous week under Jackson's command. Nevertheless, many Union prisoners fell into Confederate hands. Jackson's cavalry was disorganized from the actions of May 24 and could not execute an effective pursuit of a defeated enemy, yet Banks marched 32 miles (51 km) without a halt, threatened often by the pursuing enemy, and brought his column to Martinsburg, where the pursuit ceased. The 2nd Massachusetts received hard tack rations before the withdrawal renewed 13 miles (21 km) further to Williamsport, where the Potomac was crossed and Banks' V Corps was safe. Four companies of the 2nd Massachusetts with an equal detail from the 3rd Wisconsin and a section of artillery guarded the approaches to the river for three days while the crossing was effected and the camps were established on the Maryland side. The regiment had been severely tested; constantly serving as rear guard, it had marched 56 miles (90 km) in 33 hours, besides fighting in one pitched battle and in frequent skirmishes.

Banks was criticized for mishandling his troops and performing inadequate reconnaissance in the campaign, while his political allies sought to pin the blame for the debacle on the War Department. Despite these criticisms, Banks had managed to keep his outnumbered force whole and organized in its withdrawal. The 2nd Massachusetts had lost seven killed, six mortally and 41 otherwise wounded and 94 taken prisoners, 17 of whom were wounded. Among the captured were Maj. Dwight who had stopped to assist a wounded man, Surgeon Leland in charge of the wounded at Kernstown, and Assistant Surgeon Stone at the hospital in Winchester; all of whom were paroled within a few days. Because of his distinguished performance in the retreat, Gordon was made a brigadier general, Andrews and Dwight advanced one grade, and Company D's Capt. Savage became Major.

===== Recovery and return to the Shenandoah =====
While across the Potomac River, Brig. Gen. Greene, formerly colonel of the 60th New York, took temporarily took command of 3rd Brigade. (Note: George Sears Greene (May 6, 1801 – January 28, 1899), a member of the famous Rhode Island Greene family, was a civil engineer and one of the founders of the American Society of Civil Engineers and Architects and was responsible for numerous railroads and aqueduct construction projects in the northeastern United States. He had a record of distinguished in the U. S. Army from 1823 to 1836 after graduating second from his class at West Point. For more information, see his Wikipedia article.)

The retreat from the Valley caused fear in Washington that Jackson threaten the capital, as well as a fluirry of activity back home in Massachusetts. President Lincoln, who was exerting day to day strategic control over his armies in the field, took aggressive action in response. Not yielding to panic and drawing troops in for the immediate defense of the capital, he ordered Frémont to march from Franklin to Harrisonburg to engage Jackson and Ewell, to "operate against the enemy in such a way as to relieve Banks." He also sent orders to McDowell at Fredericksburg to stop his move on Richmond and send 20,000 men at once for the Shenandoah attack Jackson and Ewell. Lincoln's plan was to spring a trap on Jackson using the three armies of Banks, Frémont, and McDowell. Banks would recross the Potomac and pursue up the Valley. McDowell detachment would move to Front Royal positioned to join in attacking Jackson's column as it passed by and then crushing him against Frémont.

Unfortunately for Lincoln, his plan was complex and required synchronized movements by separate commands. McDowell reluctantly sent Shields' division back to Banks, to be followed by Edward Ord's division. Frémont, the real problem for Lincoln's plan, rather than marching to Harrisonburg as ordered opted to go Moorefield because of the exceptionally difficult road conditions to Harrisonburg (Note: Frémont was also aware of the enormous area his department was required to defend, as well as concerned about dividing his force and abandoning his subordinate, Jacob D. Cox, who had been attacked in the Kanawha in southwestern Virginia on May 23. .) This meant instead of a figurative hammer striking on an anvil, Lincoln could only hope for a pincer movement catching Jackson at Strasburg, requiring intricate timing for success.

Jackson learned of Shields's return march on Monday, May 26, but Lee had urged him to threaten the line of the Potomac. While the bulk of his army stayed near Charles Town, he ordered the Stonewall Brigade to demonstrate against Harpers Ferry on May 29–30. On May 30, Shields recaptured Front Royal and Jackson began moving his army back to Winchester. Lincoln's plan continued to unravel as Banks declared his army was too shaken to move in pursuit. Frémont moved slowly on poor roads while Jackson used paved roads in the valley, and Shields would not leave Front Royal until Ord's division arrived. Jackson reached Strasburg before either any of the three federal armies could attack with the Stonewall Brigade catching up with Jackson's after noon on Sunday, June 1.

Banks V Corps was finally ready and recovered to move on Tuesday, June 10. That morning, the force crossed the Potomac, and the 2nd Massachusetts bivouacked that night at Falling Waters and Wednesday night at Bunker Hill. On Thursday, June 12, the regiment and its division marched through Winchester with drums beating before continuing south on Winchester-Front Royal Pike outside Winchester to encamp, where a halt of six days followed. On Wednesday, July 18, the regiment moved to near Front Royal then halted until Sunday, July 6, during which Brig. Gen. Gordon returned to the command of the brigade.

On that Sunday, the 2nd Massachusetts marched by slow stages to and through Front Royal through the Manassas, moving 6 miles (9.7 km) to Chester Gap. After four days, Banks V Corps had moved the roughly 25 miles (40 km) to Warrenton by Friday, July 11. The regiment had now joined the Army of Virginia, commanded by Maj. Gen. Pope, who redesignated Banks' troops as his II Corps. The 1st Division now consisted of two brigades, Crawford's 1st Brigade and Gordon's 3rd (Note: The 3rd Brigade had lost the 29th Pennsylvania had been reduced to three regiments with the detachment of the 29th Pennsylvania. Additionally, Charles H. T. Collis's small company of men calling them the "Zouaves d'Afrique, or "Colis' Zouaves," which had served attached to other regiments in the valley, were attached to the 2nd Massachusetts as an extra skirmish company to the 2nd Massachusetts.) while Augur's 2nd Division had three brigades.

==== The Virginia and Maryland campaigns ====
After the collapse of McClellan's Peninsula campaign in the Seven Days Battles of June, Lincoln appointed John Pope, who had had some success in the Western Theater, to command the newly formed Army of Virginia. Lincoln hoped he would be more aggressive general than McClellan, but did not work well with his subordinate commanders although some of his enlisted men were encouraged by Pope's aggressive tone. The army consisted of the existing departments operating around Virginia: Frémont's, McDowell's, Banks'. Sturgis's brigade from the Military District of Washington, and Cox's division from the Kanawha Valley in western Virginia. It was reorganized into three corps of 51,000 men, under Sigel (I Corps); (Note: Sigel replaced Frémont, who refused to serve under Pope (his junior in rank) and resigned his command.) Banks (II Corps); and McDowell (III Corps). Sturgis's Washington troops constituted the Army reserve. Three cavalry brigades under Beardsley, Hatch and Bayard were attached directly to the three infantry corps. Parts of three of McClellan's AoP corps (III, V, and VI) and Burnside's IX Corps (commanded by Maj. Gen. Jesse L. Reno), eventually joined Pope for combat operations, raising his strength to 77,000.

Pope had been tasked in early June to demonstrate toward Gordonsville and Charlottesville and draw off as much as possible of the force in front of General McClellan, who then occupied the line of the Chickahominy, and to distract the attention of the enemy in his front so as to reduce as far as practicable the resistance opposed to his advance on Richmond. As a result, the 2nd Massachusetts found itself in Warrenton and Little Washington in the heat of the 1862 summer as Pope gathered his forces

Meanwhile, Lee sent Jackson and Longstreet north to get between Pope's gathering army and Richmond while leaving a smaller force to buffer McClellan and his beaten army on the Peninsula.

===== The Northern Virginia campaign =====
The order directing the 2nd Massachusetts to Warrenton proved to be a mistake as Little Washington, roughly 20 miles (32 km) further west by the Blue Ridge Mountains, was the place meant, and on Wednesday, July 16 the regiment marched to the correct location arriving the next day. The 2nd Massachusetts remained encamped there picketing and drilling for the next three weeks until August 6.

On July 29, Pope moved his headquarters from Washington to the field. Halleck told him of the plan to link up with McClellan's army, but rather than waiting for this to occur, Pope moved some of his forces to a position near Cedar Mountain, from whence he could launch cavalry raids on Gordonsville. In response to this threat, Jackson chose to go on the offensive, attacking Pope's vanguard under Banks, planning to repeat his defeat in detail of Pope's army, and after defeating Banks, he then hoped to move on Culpeper Court House, 26 miles (42 km) to prevent Pope from uniting his troops. Accordingly, Jackson set out on August 7 for Culpeper. As in his Shenandoah campaign, Jackson would maneuver to gain local numerical superiority in the coming action. He sent cavalry under Robertson was sent ahead to erase Pope's cavalry guarding the Rapidan River fords and occupying Madison Court House, on his left flank as he marched northward.

====== Banks moves south ======
Marching on Wednesday and Thursday, August 6 and 7, to Hazel River, 2nd Massachusetts received 50 recruits sent from home. The new men were welcomed and assigned, and they joined a march on Friday, to Culpeper, while Crawford's 1st Brigade (Note: His brigade consisted of the 5th Connecticut, 10th Maine (commanded by Col. George L. Beal), 28th New York, and 46th Pennsylvania (commanded by Col. Joseph Knipe) infantry regiments.) continued on toward Cedar Mountain to support patrolling U.S. cavalry. The 2nd Massachusetts went into bivouac about midnight.

Meanwhile, Jackson's march north had been hindered by a severe heat wave at the beginning of August, as well as by his characteristic secrecy about his intentions causing confusion among his subordinates on the exact route of advance. As such, his column had only progressed 8 miles (13 km) by the evening of August 8 when the 2nd Massachusetts encamped at Culpepper. Even though Robertson had cleared Pope's cavalry from the fords, they quickly alerted the army of the Confederate advance, so Pope ordered Sigel to reinforce Banks, and Banks was ordered to maintain a defensive line on a ridge above Cedar Run, 7 miles (11 km) south of Culpeper Court House.

Banks, still smarting from defeat by Jackson in the Valley, was anxious for revenge, and, instead of waiting for the rest of the army, he planned to take the initiative and attack Jackson before he could fully form his lines, despite being outnumbered.

On Saturday morning, August 9, Jackson crossed the Rapidan River, led by Ewell's division, followed by Winder's division, with A.P. Hill's division in the rear. Around 9:00 a.m., Ewell's vanguard. Early's brigade made contact with U.S. cavalry and artillery on the ridge above Cedar Run, just to the northwest of Cedar Mountain. At the same time back in Culpeper, Gordon received orders to move 3rd Brigade from bivouac rapidly to the front to support Crawford's 1st Brigade, 1st Division, who had met the enemy. (Note: Charles H. T. Collis, an Irish immigrant who settled in Philadelphia and became a prominent young lawyer and his officers had returned to Penmnsylvania to raise a full regiment that would become the 114th Pennsylvania Infantry Regiment. The NCOs and enlisted men of company remained attached to 2nd Massachusetts as an extra skirmishing company.).

The 2nd Massachusetts and its brigade began at once and marched from camp near Culpeper Court. After a fatiguing march in the intense heat, from the effects of which one private died on the march, the regiment reached the front at about noon. Gordon was sent with his three regiments and two batteries to take position on the extreme right by a wood near Slaughter Mountain, some 1,600 yards from the enemy's position, where it was formed in line. The 2nd Massachusetts took the left of the line and let the men stack arms and recover from the march.

====== Enemy contact ======
As stated above, Virginia was in the middle of an August heat wave which effected both armies. By 2:00 p.m., it was 98 °F (36.7 °C) and fighting did not start for another 90 minutes, 3:30 p.m., the peak of the day's heat. The sweltering heat hampered Jackson's army's movements, and the initial action consisted of a nearly two-hour artillery duel with neither side gaining a clear advantage. Some artillerymen suffered heat stroke as they frenetically fired their guns. The effective Federal artillery fire plunging around the Crittenden Gate had severely disrupted the Early's deployment in a line on the eastern side of the Culpeper-Orange Turnpike (which ran roughly parallel to present-day U.S. Route 15) on the high ground on the opposite bank of Cedar Run. As the rest of Ewell's division arrived they formed on Early's right, anchored against the northern slope of the mountain and deployed their six guns on its ridge. Winder's division formed to Early's left, on the west side of the Turnpike, with Taliaferro's brigade closest to Early, and Thomas S. Garnett's on the far left in a wheat field at the edge of a woods.

Until 4:00 p.m., the 2nd Massachusetts saw only a few discharges from the enemy's guns aimed at them when a severe artillery fire began, extending from the left of the regiment's line down the brigade. The U.S. batteries (Note: Banks' artillery consisted of 4th and 6th Maine Light Artillery Batteries; Batteries K, L, and M of the 1st New York Light Artillery Regiment; Battery L, 2nd New York Artillery; 10th Battery, New York Light Artillery; Battery E, Pennsylvania Light Artillery; and Battery F, 4th U.S. Artillery.) responded with such success that the whole of Banks' left, consisting of Augur's 2nd Division Augur's division, advanced from its first position despite Rebel artillery occupying a height giving them advantages of a plunging fire.

A little before 5:00 p.m., as the artillery fight began to wane, Charles S. Winder fell mortally wounded. (Note: Winder was killed by a gun in Hall's 2nd Maine Light Artillery Battery. He had been ill that day and was taken onto the field in an ambulance wagon. While attempting to direct his troops, he was struck by a shell fragment. Winder's left arm and side were torn to pieces, and he died a few hours later.) As a result, division command devolved on Taliaferro, who was completely ignorant of Jackson's battle plan. Dispositions on his part of the field were still incomplete with his left flank dangerously exposed to the woods.

Before leadership could properly be restored to the division the Banks' attack began. Banks gained an early advantage and mauled Winder's disorganized division. The 2nd Massachusetts, with the rest of Gordon's 3rd Brigade, was initially the only reserve.

He led off with Augur's 2nd Division, which launched an attack through the fields east of the Culpeper Road against the Confederate right. The Federal advance was swift and threatened to break the Confederate line, prompting Early to come galloping to the front from Cedar Mountain where he was directing troop dispositions. The 2nd Division's 1st (under Geary) and 2nd (under Prince) Brigades swept forward in the heat in two massive lines forward through a thick cornfield. (Note: Geary's 1st Brigade was made of the 5th Ohio, the 7th Ohio, the 29th Ohio, and the 66th Ohio regiments. Prince's 2nd Brigade was made of the 3rd Maryland, the 102nd New York, the 109th Pennsylvania, the 111th Pennsylvania, the 8th US US Infantry regiments, and the 12th US Infantry Battalion. Augur's 3rd Brigade was under the 2nd Massachusetts' former commander, Greene, who had in his brigade the 3rd Delaware, 1st District of Columbia, and the 60th and 78th New York Infantry.) Rebel batteries on his left on the slope of Cedar Mountain across the South Branch of Cedar Run opened up with solid shot into the blue ranks in the corn. (Note: This was Latimer's Virginia Battery of Ewell's Division which had moved with his two remaining brigades – Trimble's and Forno's, along the western slope of Cedar Mountain upon an elevated spot, about 200 feet above the valley.) The firing intensified as they neared the Confederates' line. The artillery kept up a galling fire. (Note: Jackson wrote "... which opened with marked effect upon the enemy's batteries. For some two hours a rapid, and continuous fire of artillery was kept up on both sides. Our batteries were well served and damaged the enemy seriously.") A small depression and a split-rail fence shielded Early's men, and the Federals, fighting without much cover save for that offered by the cornstalks, were getting the worst of the shooting match including Augur himself who received a wound in the foot.

Early's stabilizing presence and the raking fire of the Confederate guns halted the Augur's advance on the right. On the left, forward of the 2nd Massachusetts' position, Crawford attacked Winder's division, sending three of his regiments (Note: These were COL George D. Chapman's 5th Connecticut, COL Dudley Donnelly's 28th New York, and COL Joseph Knipe's 46th Pennsylvania.) directly across the wheat field while six companies of the 3rd Wisconsin, from the 3rd Brigade, advanced on Crawford's right flank through an overgrown bushy field just west of the wheat field. Crawford's assault rapidly crossed the wheat field while the attention of Garnett's men was occupied by Geary and Prince's attack on the Confederate right. The U.S. forces crashed into the woods directly into the flank of the 1st Virginia Infantry Battalion, who under the pressure from attack on two fronts broke for the rear. Crawford pushed on, not waiting to reform their lines, rolling through the outflanked 42nd Virginia until they found themselves in Taliaferro's and the artillery's rear. A gap occurred between the Rebel brigades, and Yankees men streamed through the gap. Unaware of the disaster to his right, the 3rd Brigade's old acquaintances, the Stonewall Brigade moved forward in the bushy field, routing the vastly outnumbered 3rd Wisconsin skirmishers in a matter of minutes. About to pursue the retreating Federals, the Stonewall Brigade suddenly learned their right flank, the 27th Virginia, had fled when they discovered Crawford's men in the woods to their right and rear. Jackson got the threatened Rebel batteries away before Crawford's attack could capture them, but his left threatened to break.

To counter this, Jackson now brought up A.P. Hill who counterattacked Crawford's Brigade. Gordon and his brigade heard quite a rapid musketry firing in their front, behind a range of timber distant about one-third of a mile (500 m) from their position. They soon received an order to move up and support Crawford's brigade, who was engaging the enemy's left. The 2nd Massachusetts pushed forward at the double-quick to fill the gap, and the 2nd Massachusetts on the left of the brigade line. The regiment was formed in line at the edge of the wood but was soon moved farther to the right. The fire of the regiment was mostly reserved until the advancing of the line of the enemy afforded a fair mark, when they fired by file, which was opened and continued with perfect coolness and great effect.

Initially appearing staggered, Hill's soon began flanking the brigade's right and opened a heavy fire. For at. least thirty minutes this terrible fire continued. Companies were without officers; officers and men were falling in every direction from the fire of Hill's division which outnumbered the brigade yet still, there was no general falling back. Hill's men having gained the 3rd Brigade's right and rear due to the overlapping of his superior numbers, poured a destructive crossfire into 3rd Brigade. Gordon soon realized his position was becoming untenable. His right began crumbling away until the 2nd Massachusetts stood alone and almost surrounded. Andrews found the Rebel fire so destructive that his right company was obliged to fall back, losing its captain and more than half of its men.

The enemy continued advancing, and Andrews saw his men falling rapidly with one flank having been turned. Gordon, meanwhile realized he would see his brigade destroyed if he remained there, and considering his duty served, ordered a retreat to save his brigade. Andrews at once complied therewith, and the regiment fell back across Cedar Creek to nearly its original position. While retreating, the color sergeant discovered that the regimental colors' eagle - a rich, heavily gold-plated one at the top of the staff - had been shot off; already some back from the forward position, he retraced his steps, found the eagle, and brought it back in triumph gaining a field commission. Jackson's advance was stopped, however, by the appearance of Ricketts 2nd Division of McDowell's III Corps. At that position, the 2nd Massachusetts passed the night until relieved by the aforementioned troops from McDowell's corps.

====== The Rappahannock and Second Bull Run ======
The regiment and its brigade had been under fire for roughly 30 minutes yet had suffered greatly. Gordon reported, "I had lost more than 30 in every 100 of my command." The casualties of the regiment were heavy, embracing more than a third of the force taken into action. The 2nd Massachusetts had lost six officers killed and mortally wounded (including Major Savage), (Note: Per Col. Andrews – "I have to lament the loss of Company A's Capt. Abbott, Company G's Capt. Cary, Company K's Capt, Goodwin, Company E's Capt. Williams, and Company H's 2nd Lieut. Perkins, all of whom fell on the field, having done all that officers could do to encourage and direct their men, and displaying perfect coolness and courage. Saddening as is the loss of these brave, gallant officers, all of whom were men of education, ability, and high social position, who had devoted themselves to the service of their country in her hour of need and proved themselves able and faithful in the discharge of duty, there remains the consolation.") two wounded and taken prisoners, one a prisoner but not wounded, and four seriously wounded but still within their lines, and several others slightly wounded. Of 23 officers who led their men into action only seven came back unhurt. Of 500 enlisted men 160 were killed, wounded or missing. On a positive note, just prior to contact with the Rebels, seven Confederate cavalrymen have been captured by the 2nd Massachusetts' pickets who had advanced under the impression that the men in the woods belonged to their own army.

From Culpepper the regiment was moved, in common with the whole of General Pope's army, to the north bank of the Rappahannock, on Tuesday, August 19. Here for one week, it was moved up and down the stream every day without tents or other baggage, and after the movement of Jackson upon Manassas, with little food, until at times officers and privates alike were reduced to the growing corn around them. Often under fire, performing hard marches, with no shelter at night during heavy rain, moving daily to the sound of the cannon, the few weeks of the service on the Rappahannock severely tasked the devotion of this regiment.

At the time of the Second Battle of Bull Run, General Banks' II Corps lay within sound of the conflict but were left idle. The next morning, II Corps, supposedly cut off from the main army, had orders to burn all luggage and all ambulances save one to a regiment, and by a detour across the Occoquan, escape from Broad Creek to Centreville, or further North.` The 2nd Massachusetts, by permission, saved its train on condition it should cause no delay, and again placed in front, forded the Occoquan, and during a pouring rain, marched five hours without a halt. The subsequent few days and nights were characterized by great hardships and exposure, but on the 2nd of September it came inside the line of the fortifications in front of Washington.

===== The Maryland campaign =====
Maryland Campaign, actions September 3–20, 1862 Confederate Union

Despite significant Confederates manpower losses over the spring and summer campaigns, Lee decided to invade Maryland and Pennsylvania, and cut off the B&O from Washington threatening the capital and Baltimore, to "annoy and harass the enemy." This invasion would relieve pressure on Virginia's agriculture, lower Northern morale and adversely influence the upcoming mid-term Congressional elections of 1862 approaching in November, incite an uprising in Maryland, and gain foreign recognition by an Army of Northern Virginia (ANV) victory on Northern soil.

After Pope's defeat, Lincoln reluctantly turned back to Maj. Gen. McClellan who repaired the Army of the Potomac (AoP) after the First Battle of Bull Run and could do it again. On September 2, Lincoln named McClellan to command "the fortifications of Washington, and all the troops for the defense of the capital." McClellan, a strong organizer and a skilled trainer of troops, took command of the AoP, bolstered by units absorbed from Pope's army, included six infantry corps, about 102,000 men. He organized his army into six corps. Hooker's I Corps had the divisions of King, Ricketts, and Meade. Sumner's II Corps had the divisions of Richardson, Sedgwick, and French. Porter's V Corps had the divisions of Morell's, Sykes, and Humphreys. Franklin's VI Corps had the divisions of Slocum and Smith, and Couch (from the IV Corps). Burnside IX Corps had the divisions of Willcox, Sturgis, Rodman, and Cox (the Kanawha Division). Finally, Mansfield's XII Corps had the divisions of Williams and Greene, and Alfred Pleasonton's cavalry division. The 1st Division was the 2nd Massachusetts' division. It still consisted of Crawford's 1st Brigade and Gordon's 3rd Brigade.

McClellan's AoP left Washington starting on September 7 with his 87,000-man army in a slow pursuit. Naturally cautious, he assumed he would be facing over 120,000 Confederates, and as a result, argued with Washington that the forces defending the capital report to him. The Kanawha Division had joined an AoP with low morale after its defeats on the Peninsula and at Second Bull Run, but upon moving northwest into Maryland, the morale rose due to the "friendly, almost tumultuous welcome" that they received from the citizens of the state. (Note: As McPherson and other historians have noted, this was a contrast to the reception of the Confederate invasion which was lukewarm at best and hostile at most, despite the state being a slave state.) McClellan had organized his army into three wings as he moved northwest in pursuit of Lee. Burnside, as the Right Wing, now commanded Hooker's I and IX Corps, now commanded by Reno. The Center Wing, was under Maj. Gen. Edwin Vose Sumner, was his II Corps and Mansfield's XII Corps. The Left Wing, commanded by Maj. Gen. William B. Franklin, consisted of his own VI Corps and Maj. Gen. Darius N. Couch's division of the IV Corps.

On September 17, the II Corps was redesignated as the XII Corps, Army of the Potomac, with the 2nd Massachusetts remaining in the 3rd Brigade of the 1st Division. During the Battle of Antietam, the XII Corps, commanded by Maj. Gen. Joseph K. Mansfield supported General Joseph Hooker's advanced through the cornfield during the morning phase of the battle and received heavy casualties including Lieutenant Colonel Dwight, who was mortally wounded. The regiment lost 12 killed and 51 wounded, among the wounded were Captains Francis and Robert Gould Shaw along with Lieutenants Crowninshield and Mills. General Mansfield was also killed in the battle and command of the XII Corps passed to General Henry W. Slocum.

==== Fredericksburg and Burnside ====
Later in the year, they marched to Fredericksburg, Virginia, but did not participate in the Battle of Fredericksburg. During this time, at Stafford Court House, Captain Shaw left the regiment to become colonel of the 54th Massachusetts Infantry.

In May, 1863, the regiment participated in the Battle of Chancellorsville. In the battle, Stonewall Jackson's corps executed a surprise flanking movement and smashed into the right flank of the Army of the Potomac, severely damaging the unsuspecting XI Corps. The neighboring troops, including the XII Corps with the 2nd Massachusetts, entrenched hastily and was able to stop the Confederate advance before it overran the entire army.

=== Battle of Gettysburg ===
After Chancellorsville, the regiment marched north to Pennsylvania following General Robert E. Lee's Army of Northern Virginia. It participated in the Battle of Gettysburg. On July 3, the third day of the battle, it made an attack against the Confederate troops at the base of Culp's Hill, near Spangler Spring. The regiment's commander, 23-year-old Lieutenant Colonel Charles R. Mudge, replied to the order to attack, "Well it is murder, but it's the order." In the charge a bullet struck Mudge just below the throat and killed him instantly. The regiment suffered 137 casualties in the assault. After the battle, the regiment was sent to New York City to help end the Draft Riots that were going on. Cpt. Charles Fessenden Morse of Company B was promoted to lieutenant colonel.

=== Atlanta ===
Late in 1863, the XII Corps, with the 2nd Massachusetts included, along with the XI Corps was placed under the command of General Joseph Hooker and sent west to join the Army of the Cumberland. (Note: The route began on the United States Military Railroad (USMRR) in Virginia before transitioning to the Baltimore & Ohio RR from Washington to Columbus, the Columbus, Piqua and Indiana Railroad (CP&I) and Indiana Central Railway to Indianapolis, the Louisville, New Albany and Chicago Railroad (LNA&C) to Louisville, the Louisville & Nashville Railroad (L&N) to Nashville, and finally using the Nashville & Chattanooga Railway (N&CR) to reach Bridgeport. Hooker's command traveled 1,200 miles from Virginia to Knoxville in eleven and a half days with two corps of 20,000 men arriving intact with all arms and supplies. In contrast, Longstreet's 12,000 troops arrived piecemeal after a twelve-day 800-mile journey with fifteen different railroads. The Rebels' original plan of four-days travel over five railroads and 540 miles had been scuttled by the Burnside's capture of Knoxville cutting the East Tennessee and Virginia Railroad.) Hooker's two Corps played a decisive role in the Battle of Wauhatchie, which opened up the "Cracker Line" to the besieged Union army, and seized Lookout Mountain in the famed "Battle Above The Clouds" during the early stages of the Battle of Chattanooga. In 1864, it participated in General William T. Sherman's Atlanta campaign. Later, the XI Corps and XII Corps were combined to form the XX Corps. It participated in the Battle of Kennesaw Mountain, The Battle of Peachtree Creek and the Siege of Atlanta. In September, it was part of the forces the occupied Atlanta, with Lt. Col. Morse serving as provost marshal of the city.

=== March to the sea ===
In November, the 2nd Massachusetts was part of Sherman's March to the Sea. The regiment was in Raleigh, North Carolina, when General Joseph E. Johnston's Confederate army surrendered to Sherman on April 26, 1865. The regiment was mustered out in July. The 2nd Massachusetts Regiment lost during service 14 Officers and 176 Enlisted men killed and mortally wounded and 2 Officers and 96 Enlisted men by disease for a total of 288.

== Affiliations, battle honors, detailed service, and casualties ==
=== Organizational affiliation ===
Attached to:

- Attached to Abercrombie's Brigade, Patterson's Army, July, 1861
- Abercrombie's Brigade, Banks' Division, Department of the Shenandoah, to August, 1861
- Gordon's Brigade, Banks' Division, Army of the Potomac (AoP), to March 1862.
- Gordon's 3rd Brigade, Williams' 1st Division, Banks' V Corps, to April, 1862.
- 3rd Brigade, 1st Division, Dept. of the Shenandoah, to June, 1862
- 3rd Brigade, 1st Division, II Corps, Pope's Army of Virginia (AoV), to September, 1862
- 3rd Brigade, 1st Division, XII Corps, Army of the Potomac (AoP), to October, 1863
- 3rd Brigade, 1st Division, XII Corps, Army of the Cumberland (AoC), to April, 1864
- 2nd Brigade, 1st Division, XX Corps, AoC, to July, 1865

=== List of battles ===
The official list of battles in which the regiment bore a part:

- First Battle of Winchester
- Battle of Cedar Mountain
- Battle of Antietam
- Battle of Chancellorsville
- Battle of Gettysburg
- Battle of Wauhatchie
- Battle of Lookout Mountain
- Battle of Missionary Ridge
- Battle of Kennesaw Mountain
- Battle of Peachtree Creek
- Siege of Atlanta
- Sherman's March to the Sea

=== Detailed service ===
==== 1861 ====
- Organized at Camp Andrew in West Roxbury, MA for three year service, June 20
- Mustered into federal service July 8
- Moved by train and steamship to Maryland, July 8
- Duty at Harper's Ferry, WV, August to October, 1861
- At Conrad's Ferry October 23–24, and picket duty at Seneca Mills until December 4
- Duty at Frederick, MD, until February 27, 1862

==== 1862 ====
- Reconnaissance to Charleston February 27–28
- Occupation of Winchester March 12
- Pursuit of Jackson up the Shenandoah Valley March 24-April 27
- First Battle of Kernstown March 22–23
- Strasburg, March 27
- Woodstock April 1
- Edenburg April 1–2
- Operations in Shenandoah Valley May 15-June 17
- Buckton Station May 23
- Retreat to Martinsburg and Williamsport May 23-June 6
- Middletown and Newtown May 24
- Battle of Winchester May 25 (Rear guard May 24–25)
- At Williamsport until June 10
- Moved to Front Royal June 10–18, thence to Warrenton and Little Washington July 11–17
- Pope's Campaign in Northern Virginia August 6-September 2
- Battle of Cedar Mountain August 9
- Fords of the Rappahannock August 19–23
- Guard trains during the Second Battle of Bull Run August 28–30
- Maryland Campaign September 6–22
- Battle of Antietam September 16–17
- Duty at Maryland Heights September 19-October 29
- Picket duty at Blackford's Ford and Sharpsburg, MD, until December
- March to Fredericksburg December 12–16
- Duty there until January 20, 1863
- Action at Dumfries, VA, December 29

==== 1863 ====
- Mud March January 20–24
- At Stafford Court House until April 27
- Chancellorsville Campaign April 27-May 6.
- Battle of Chancellorsville May 1–5
- Brandy Station and Beverly Ford June 9
- Gettysburg Campaign June 11-July 24.
- Battle of Gettysburg July 1–4
- Pursuit of Lee to Warrenton Junction, VA, July 5–24
- On detached duty at New York City to suppress riots, August 16 to September 13
- Transfer to Army of the Cumberland and moved to Bridgeport, AL, September 24-October 3
- Depart Culpeper on United States Military Railroad (USMRR) for Washington DC September 24
- Entrain at Washington September 25 and travel via Baltimore, MD; Columbus, OH; Indianapolis IN; Louisville, KY, and Nashville, TN
- Arrived Stevenson, AL, thence Bridgeport, October 3
- Guarding Nashville & Chattanooga Railroad at Elkwater Bridge and Tullahoma until April, 1864
- Regiment veteranize December 31, 1863

==== 1864 ====
- Veterans on furlough January 10 to March 1, 1864
- Atlanta Campaign May 1-June 11
- Demonstration on Rocky Faced Ridge and Dalton May 8–11
- Battle of Resaca May 14–15
- Cassville May 19
- Non-Veterans left front for muster out May 22, and mustered out at Chattanooga, Tenn., May 25, 1864
- New Hope Church May 25
- Operations on line of Pumpkin Vine Creek and battles about Dallas, New Hope Church and Allatoona Hills May 26–29
- Guard trains to Kingston and back May 29-June 8
- Raccoon Creek June 6
- Operations about Marietta and against Kennesaw Mountain June 10-July 2
- Marietta June 11–14
- Gilgal or Golgotha Church June 15
- Lost Mountain June 15–17
- Muddy Creek June 17
- Noyes Creek June 19
- Kolb's Farm June 22
- Assault on Kenesaw June 27
- Ruff's Station or Smyrna Camp Ground July 4
- Chattahoochie River July 5–17
- Peach Tree Creek July 19–20
- Siege of Atlanta July 22-August 25
- Operations at Chattahoochie River Bridge August 26-September 2
- Occupation of Atlanta September 2-November 15
- March to the Sea November 15-December 10
- Monteith Swamp December 9
- Siege of Savannah December 10–21

==== 1865 ====
- Campaign of the Carolinas January to April
- Thompson's Creek, near Chesterfield, March 2
- Thompson's Creek, near Cheraw, SC, March 3
- Averysboro, NC, March 16
- Battle of Bentonville, March 19–21
- Occupation of Goldsboro March 24
- Advance on Raleigh April 9–13
- Occupation of Raleigh April 14
- Bennett's House April 26, for surrender of Johnston and his army
- March to Washington, DC, via Richmond, VA, April 29-May 20
- Grand Review May 23
- Provost duty at Washington until July
- Mustered out July 11, and discharged at Boston, MA, July 26

=== Casualties ===
The regiment lost a total of 288 men during service; 14 officers and 176 enlisted men killed or mortally wounded, 2 officers and 96 enlisted men died of disease.

== Notable members ==
- George Leonard Andrews (August 31, 1828 — April 4, 1899) was an American professor and civil engineer.
- William Cogswell (August 23, 18388 — May 22, 1895) was a U.S. representative from Massachusetts, the 16th and 19th mayor of Salem who was also a prominent Essex County attorney.
- Greely Stevenson Curtis (November 21, 1830 – February 12, 1897) was a civil engineer, architect and fire commissioner of Boston
- George Henry Gordon (July 19, 1823 — August 30, 1886) was a prominent lawyer.
- Henry Lee Higginson (November 18, 1834 — November 14, 1919) was a businessman and philanthropist best known as the founder of the Boston Symphony Orchestra and a patron of Harvard University.
- Charles Fessenden Morse (September 22, 1839 – December 11, 1926) was an influential businessman and civic leader in postwar Kansas City, Missouri.
- Samuel Miller Quincy (June 13, 1832 — March 24, 1887) was the 28th mayor of New Orleans and the son of Josiah Quincy Jr., former mayor of Boston.
- Robert Gould Shaw (October 10, 1837 — July 18, 1863) was born into an abolitionist family from the Boston upper class, and commanded the first all-black regiment (the 54th Massachusetts) in the Northeast.
- Adin Ballou Underwood (May 19, 1828 — January 24, 1888) was an attorney and later the commander of the 33rd Massachusetts Volunteer Infantry who was seriously wounded at the Battle of Wauhatchie, and postwar served as surveyor of the Port of Boston and returned to his law practice.

== Monuments ==
There is a monument to the 2nd Massachusetts at Gettysburg which was erected in 1879. It is positioned on Colgrove Avenue near Spangler's Meadow. The monument was the first regimental monument placed on what is widely considered the "battlefield" today.

Form the tablet on the front of the monument:

From the hill behind this monument on the morning of July 3, the Second Massachusetts Infantry made an assault upon the Confederate troops in the works at the base of Culp's Hill opposite. The regiment carried to the charge 22 officers and 294 enlisted men. It lost 4 officers and 41 enlisted men killed and mortally wounded and 6 officers and 84 enlisted men wounded. To perpetuate the honored memories of that the survivors of the Regiment have raised this stone 1879.

From the rear:

Lieut. Col. Charles R. Mudge Captain Thomas B. Fox Captain Thomas R. Robeson Lieut. Henry V.D. Stone
Color bearers - Leavitt C. Durgin, Rupert J. Sadler, Stephen Cody
First Sergeant Alonzo J. Babcock, Sergeant William H. Blunt.
Corporals
Charles Burdett, Theodore S. Butters, Jeremiah S. Hall, Patrick Heoy, Ruel Whittier, Gordon S. Wilson.
Privates
Samuel T. Alton, George M. Baily, Henry C. Ball, Wallace Bascom, John Briggs, Jr., David B. Brown, William T. Bullard, James A. Chase, Peter Conlan, John Derr, James T. Edmunds, William H. Ela, John E. Farrington, Silas P. Foster, Willard Foster, Joseph Furber, Fritz Goetz, Daniel A Hatch, John J. Jewett, John Joy, Charles Kiernan, William Marshall, Frederick Maynard, Andrew Nelson, Rufus A. Parker, Philo H. Peck, Sidney S. Prouty, Richard Seavers, Charles Trayner, David L. Wade

One of the two lion sculptures flanking the grand staircase at the Boston Public Library is dedicated to the Second Massachusetts. The plinth it rests on lists their engagements. The lion is by Louis St Gaudens and was funded by surviving members of the regiment in the early 1890s.

== Popular culture ==
The advance of the 2nd Massachusetts through Miller's Cornfield during the Battle of Antietam is portrayed at the beginning of the 1989 film Glory. The "2nd Mass" is portrayed in the Falling Skies television show.

== Later units ==
The 211th Military Police Battalion maintains lineage and honors of the 2nd Massachusetts and is a subordinate unit of the Massachusetts National Guard.

== See also ==
- List of Massachusetts Civil War units
- Massachusetts in the Civil War
