= George Leonard Andrews =

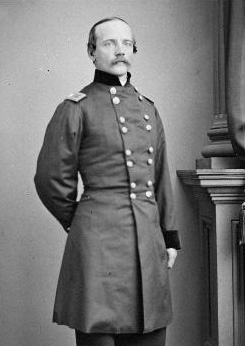
- George Leonard Andrews
- Born: August 31, 1828; Bridgewater, Massachusetts, U.S.
- Died: April 4, 1899 (aged 70); Brookline, Massachusetts, U.S.
- Burial place: Mount Auburn Cemetery; Cambridge, Massachusetts
- Military career
- Allegiance: United States of America; Union
- Branch: United States Army; Union Army
- Service years: 1851–1855; 1861–1865
- Rank: Brigadier General; Brevet Major General
- Commands: 2nd Massachusetts Infantry Regiment; 2nd Brigade, 1st Division, XII Corps; 4th Brigade, 1st Division, XII Corps; 1st Brigade, 3rd Division, XIX Corps; Corps d'Afrique; District of Baton Rouge and Port Hudson
- Conflicts: American Civil War; First Battle of Winchester; Battle of Cedar Mountain; Battle of Antietam; Siege of Port Hudson
- Other work: United States Marshal, Professor of French & Modern Languages at the United States Military Academy

George Leonard Andrews (August 31, 1828 – April 4, 1899) was an American professor, civil engineer, and soldier. He was a brigadier general in the Union Army during the American Civil War and was awarded the honorary grade of brevet major general.

During the Civil War, Andrews served in a number of important commands, first as the colonel of the 2nd Massachusetts, a regiment which saw heavy action in the Battles of Cedar Mountain and Antietam, among other actions. Mentored by Maj. Gen. Nathaniel Prentice Banks, Andrews became part of Banks's staff and was assigned several command roles in the Army Department of the Gulf during the later years of the war.

After the war, Andrews pursued a variety of vocations, including service as a United States Marshal, before returning to the United States Military Academy at West Point as a professor until his retirement.

== Early career ==
George Andrews was born in Bridgewater, Massachusetts, son of Manasseh and Harriet Leonard Andrews. In 1851, Andrews graduated first in his class from the United States Military Academy at West Point. After graduating, he was assigned to the Army Corps of Engineers with the rank of brevet second lieutenant. From 1851 to 1854, he served as assistant to Lt. Col. Sylvanus Thayer who was in command of the construction of Fort Warren in Boston harbor. From 1854 to 1855, he was assistant professor of engineering at West Point. He then resigned from the service and was engaged in civil engineering work until the beginning of the Civil War. Some sources have confused General Andrews with Colonel George Lippitt Andrews, U.S. Army (as both are George L. Andrews).

== Civil War ==
=== 2nd Massachusetts ===
At the start of the Civil War, Andrews assisted with the organization of the 2nd Regiment Massachusetts Volunteer Infantry of which he was appointed lieutenant colonel. The 2nd Massachusetts was attached in July 1861 to the Army Department of the Shenandoah commanded by Maj. Gen. Nathaniel Banks. During 1861, they took part in minor operations in the vicinity of Harpers Ferry, Virginia.

In the spring of 1862, Banks's forces were confronted by Lt. Gen. Thomas Jackson's Confederate forces in a series of battles known as Jackson's Valley Campaign. In May 1862, Andrews succeeded Col. George Henry Gordon as commander of the 2nd Massachusetts and led the regiment during the First Battle of Winchester. On June 13, 1862, Andrews was promoted to colonel.

Andrews remained in command of the 2nd Massachusetts until October 2, 1862, during which time he led the regiment in two more major battles. On August 9, 1862, Banks's forces again engaged Jackson, and were again defeated, in the Battle of Cedar Mountain. In early September, Banks was reassigned to the defenses of Washington and his forces were re-organized, becoming the XII Corps in the Army of the Potomac, and took part in the Maryland Campaign. During this campaign, Andrews led the 2nd Massachusetts in the Battle of Antietam on September 17, 1862. The regiment took part in the assaults on the Confederate position through the infamous Cornfield and suffered heavy casualties before being forced to make an orderly retreat.

In October 1862, Andrews was elevated to brigade command and briefly commanded the 2nd Brigade, 1st Division of the XII Corps, then the 4th Brigade of the same division while the Army of the Potomac re-grouped in the aftermath of the Maryland Campaign.

=== New Orleans expedition ===
On October 26, 1862, Andrews was assigned to Maj. Gen. Banks's expedition to New Orleans and was promoted to brigadier general on November 9, 1862. As a key member of Banks's staff, Andrews spent the winter of 1862–1863 in New York City, playing a major role in organization and planning the expedition. Banks replaced Maj. Gen. Benjamin Butler as commander of the Department of the Gulf and intended to move north from New Orleans with a large force to assist in taking control of the Mississippi River.

Andrews reached New Orleans with the last detachment of new troops on February 11, 1863. He was briefly placed in command of the 1st Brigade, 3rd Division, XIX Corps but less than a month later, in March 1863, Andrews was appointed chief of staff to Maj. Gen. Banks. In this capacity, Andrews assisted in organizing the Siege of Port Hudson, a costly operation consisting of several naval and land assaults. Confederate forces in Port Hudson, the last Confederate stronghold on the Mississippi River, ultimately surrendered on July 9, 1863, after hearing of the surrender of Vicksburg, Mississippi. Andrews personally accepted the sword of the Confederate commander of Port Hudson during the formal surrender and returned it to him as a compliment to their bravery.

=== District of Baton Rouge and Port Hudson ===
The day after the fall of Port Hudson, Andrews was assigned to organize the African-American troops in the Army of the Gulf, forming the Corps d'Afrique. Andrews was also placed in command of the Army District of Baton Rouge and Port Hudson. He retained command of the district and the Corps d'Afrique until February 1865. To recruit African-Americans, Andrews dispatched soldiers to plantations throughout his district to enlist freed slaves.

On February 27, Andrews was relieved from command of the District of Baton Rouge and Port Hudson and reported to New Orleans where he was appointed provost marshal general for the Department of the Gulf. He served as an aide to Maj. Gen. Edward Canby during the Siege of Mobile Campaign which forced the surrender of the last Confederate stronghold on the Gulf coast. For his service during this campaign, Andrews was given a commendation by Canby.

After the Confederacy's surrender in April 1865, Andrews spent a portion of the summer as Maj. Gen. Canby's chief of staff, then resigned his commission on August 24, 1865. On January 13, 1866, President Andrew Johnson nominated Andrews to the honorary grade of brevet major general, United States Volunteers, to rank from March 26, 1865, and the United States Senate confirmed the award on March 12, 1866.

== Post-war career ==
After the Civil War, Andrews spent two years as a planter in Mississippi. He then moved back to Massachusetts and was a United States marshal from 1867 to 1871. He was a professor of French at West Point from 1871 to 1882, and of modern languages from 1882 until his retirement in 1892. he died in 1899

Fort Andrews, a fortification on Peddocks Island in Boston Harbor, was named after him. Constructed in 1897, the fort held the largest garrison of any fortification in Boston Harbor in the early 20th century (two thousand troops). It was abandoned by the U.S. Army in 1946 and is currently in ruins.

== See also ==
- List of American Civil War generals (Union)
- List of Massachusetts generals in the American Civil War
- Massachusetts in the American Civil War
