= Adin Ballou Underwood =

American lawyer

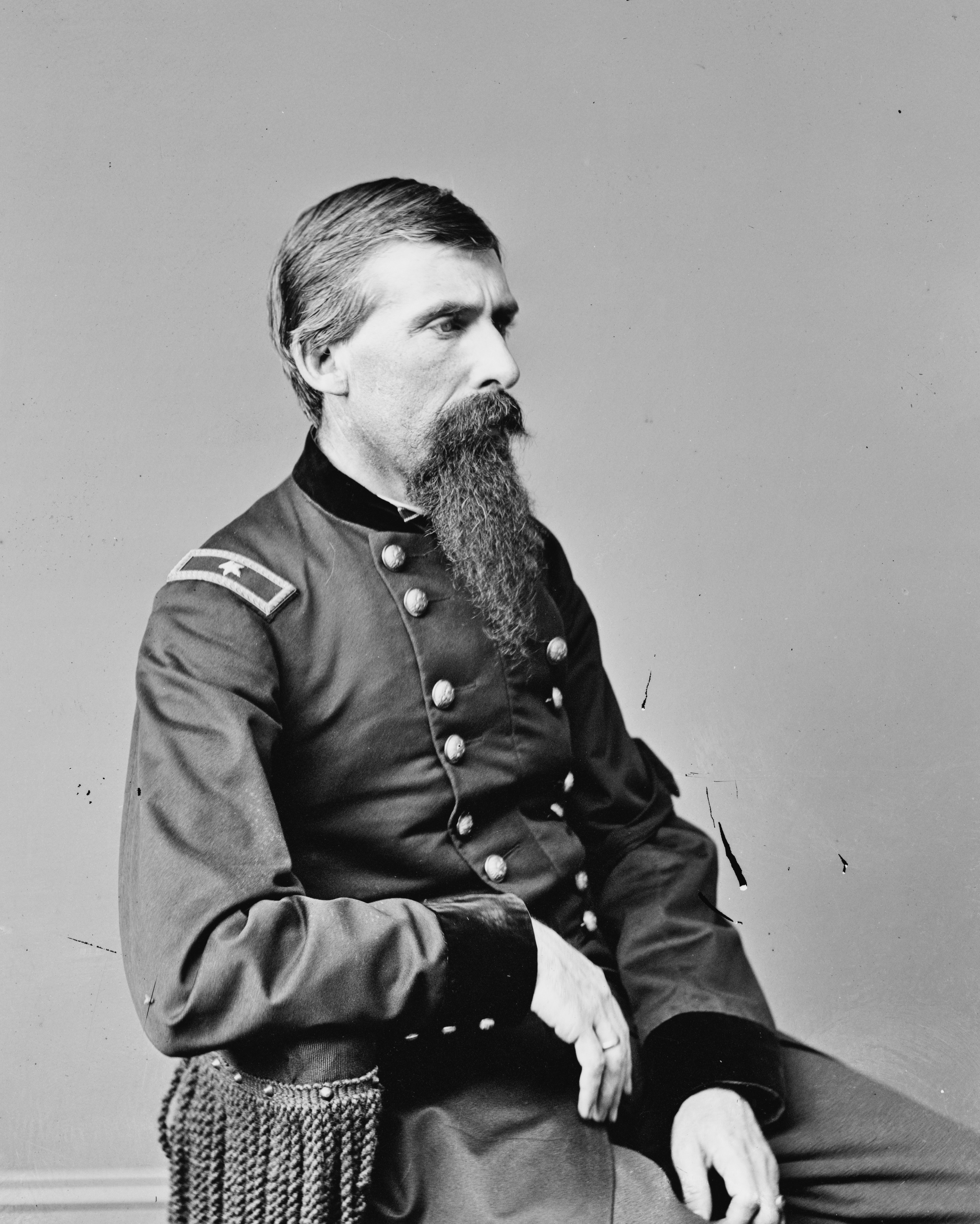
- Born: May 19, 1828; Milford, Massachusetts, U.S.
- Died: January 24, 1888 (aged 59); Boston, Massachusetts, U.S.
- Burial place: Newton, Massachusetts, U.S.
- Education: Brown University; Harvard Law School
- Military career
- Allegiance: United States of America: Union
- Branch: Union Army
- Rank: Brigadier General; Brevet Major General
- Unit: 2nd Massachusetts Infantry Regiment
- Commands: 33rd Massachusetts Infantry Regiment
- Conflicts: American Civil War; Battle of Fredericksburg; Battle of Chancellorsville; Battle of Gettysburg; Battle of Wauhatchie
- Other work: Lawyer, Customs Surveyor

Adin Ballou Underwood (May 19, 1828 – January 24, 1888) was a general in the Union Army during the American Civil War.

== Biography ==
Underwood was born in Milford, Massachusetts, on May 19, 1828, and was renamed later after Christian activist Adin Ballou. He studied law at Brown University, attended Harvard Law School and spent a year in Prussia. When the civil war began he practiced law in Boston. He was commissioned as Captain in the 2nd Massachusetts Infantry Regiment. In 1862 he joined the new 33rd Massachusetts Infantry Regiment as a Major and served in that unit; eventually becoming its Colonel in April 1863.

After the Gettysburg campaign the XI Corps, of which the regiment was part of, transferred to the west.

On October 29, at the Battle of Wauhatchie, Underwood was shot in the thigh and crippled for life. He still was promoted to Brigadier General in November. The wound healed slowly and when he returned to duty in 1865 he was medically unfit for field service, instead doing court-martial duty. In August 1865 he was brevetted to Major General and mustered out of the U.S. Volunteers. Returning to Boston; he served as surveyor of the port and practiced law again. Underwood died there on January 24, 1888.

== Works ==
- The Three Years' Service of the Thirty-third Mass. Infantry Regiment 1862-1865. 1880.

== See also ==
- List of American Civil War generals (Union)
