= Camp Andrew =

Former American Civil War training camp

Coordinates: 42°17′34.81″N 71°10′23.31″W

Camp Andrew is a former American Civil War training camp that existed in 1861 in West Roxbury, Massachusetts. It was named for John Albion Andrew, governor of Massachusetts at the time, and was used for the initial organization of the 2nd Massachusetts Infantry Regiment in May–July 1861. The site was on the former Brook Farm, a utopian socialist community from 1841 through 1847. As a youth, Robert Gould Shaw was taken on visits to Brook Farm by his father. He is most famous as the commander of the 54th Massachusetts Infantry Regiment. In his early military career he trained at Camp Andrew as an officer of the 2nd Massachusetts.

== See also ==
- List of military installations in Massachusetts
