= Oak Grove Cemetery (Falmouth, Massachusetts) =

Historic cemetery in Massachusetts, United States

- U.S. National Register of Historic Places
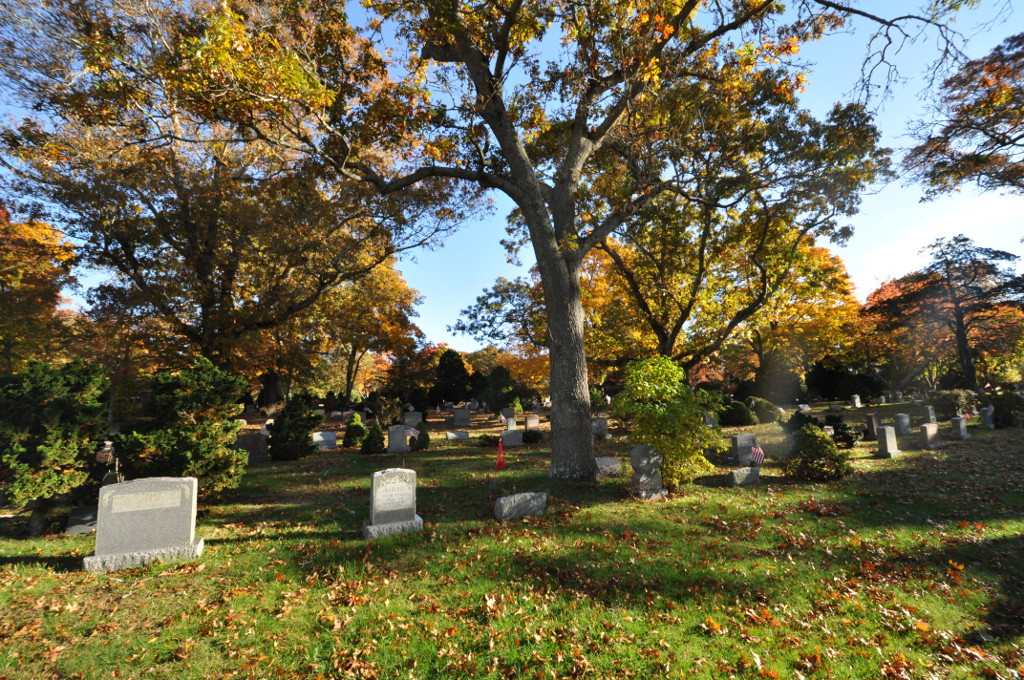

- Location within Cape Cod Location within Massachusetts Location within the United States
- Location: 48 Jones Road, Falmouth, Massachusetts
- Coordinates: 41.5639°N 70.6165°W
- Area: 22 acres (8.9 ha)
- Built: 1851 (relocated burials have earlier dates)
- NRHP reference No.: 14000560
- Added to NRHP: September 10, 2014

The Oak Grove Cemetery is an historic cemetery on Jones Road in Falmouth, Massachusetts.

== Overview ==
The private cemetery was established in 1849 with the initial purchase of 5 acres (2.0 ha) of land fronting on Palmer Road. This original section of the cemetery was laid out in the then-popular rural cemetery style, with winding lanes. The cemetery was enlarged in 1886, 1939, and 1952, with the 1939 purchase including the section facing Jones Road that now serves as its main entrance. Its Colonial Revival chapel was built in 1935 with funding by a bequest of Elizabeth G. Parke. The cemetery is the burying ground for many of Falmouth's most important citizens, including most of its veterans (including those from the American Revolutionary War and the War of 1812 which were relocated from family cemeteries), and ship captains who were the town's leading citizens in the 19th century. One of its most famous burials is that of Katharine Lee Bates, author of "America The Beautiful".

The cemetery was listed on the National Register of Historic Places in 2014.

== Notable burials ==
- Frank Barrows (1844–1922), Major League Baseball player for the Boston Red Stockings
- Katharine Lee Bates (1859–1929), author of America the Beautiful
- Sylvia Donaldson (1849–1937), one of the first women elected to the Massachusetts House of Representatives
- Robert Emmons (1872–1928), football player and coach, yachtsman, and millionaire
- Irvin McDowell Garfield (1870–1951), son of president James A. Garfield
- Charles Fessenden Morse (1839–1926), Union Army officer
- Joshua Crowell Robinson (1834–1908), member of the Massachusetts House of Representatives

== See also ==
- National Register of Historic Places listings in Barnstable County, Massachusetts
- Oak Grove Cemetery at Find a Grave
