= Battery M, 1st New York Light Artillery =

Battery I, 1st New York Light Artillery Regiment
- Active: 15 November 1861 – 23 June 1865
- Country: United States
- Allegiance: (United States) Union; New York
- Branch: Union Army
- Type: Field Artillery
- Size: Artillery Battery
- Equipment: 4 x 10-pounder Parrott rifles and 2 x 3-inch Ordnance rifles (1862); 1857 12-pounder Napoleons (1864)
- Engagements: American Civil War; 1st Battle of Winchester (1862); Battle of Cedar Mountain (1862); 2nd Battle of Bull Run (1862); Battle of Antietam (1862); Battle of Chancellorsville (1863); Battle of Gettysburg (1863); Atlanta campaign (1864); Sherman's March to the Sea (1864); Battle of Bentonville (1865)

Commanders
- Notable commanders: George W. Cothran; John D. Woodbury

Battery M, 1st New York Light Artillery Regiment was an artillery battery from New York state that served in the Union Army during the American Civil War. The battery was organized in October 1861. It fought at First Winchester, Cedar Mountain, Second Bull Run, and Antietam in 1862. Battery M fought at Chancellorsville and Gettysburg in 1863. It took part in the Atlanta campaign and Sherman's March to the Sea in 1864 and fought at Bentonville in 1865. The battery marched in the Grand Review of the Armies and was mustered out in June 1865.

== Organizations ==
Organized at Lockport, N.Y., and mustered in at Rochester November 15, 1861. Left State for Washington, D.C., November 21, 1861. Attached to Banks' Division, Army of the Potomac, to March, 1862. Artillery, Williams' Division, Banks' 5th Army Corps, to April, 1862, and Dept. of the Shenandoah to June, 1862. Artillery, 1st Division, 2nd Army Corps, Army of Virginia, to September, 1862. Artillery, 1st Division, 12th Army Corps, Army of the Potomac, to May, 1863. Artillery Brigade, 12th Army Corps, Army of the Potomac, to October, 1863. Artillery, 1st Division, 12th Army Corps, Army of the Cumberland, to April, 1864. Artillery, 1st Division, 20th Army Corps, to July, 1864. Artillery Brigade, 20th Army Corps, to June, 1865.

== Service ==
Duty in the Defenses of Washington, D. C., until March, 1862. Advance on Winchester March, 1862. Occupation of Winchester March 12. Advance from Strasburg to Woodstock and Edenburg April 1–2. Woodstock April 1. Edenburg April 1–2. Near Edenburg April 7–11 and 14. South Fork of the Shenandoah April 19. McGaheysville April 27. Operations in the Shenandoah Valley to June 17. Middletown and Newtown May 24. Winchester May 25. Retreat to Williamsport May 25–26. Battle of Cedar Mountain August 9. Pope's Campaign in Northern Virginia August 16-September 2. Beverly Ford August 20. Rappahannock River August 21. Plains of Manassas August 27–29. Battle of Bull Run August 30 (Reserve). Battle of Antietam September 16–17. At Maryland Heights until December. March to Fairfax Station December 10–14 and duty there until January 20, 1863. "Mud March" January 20–24, 1863. Duty at Stafford Court House until April 27. Chancellorsville Campaign April 27-May 6. Battle of Chancellorsville May 1–5. Gettysburg (Pa.) Campaign June 11-July 24. Battle of Gettysburg, Pa., October 4. Guard Nashville & Chattanooga Railroad until April, 1864. Reopening Tennessee River October 26–29. Atlanta (Ga.) Campaign May 1 to September 8. Operations about Rocky Faced Ridge, Tunnel Hill and Buzzard's Roost Gap May 8–13. Battle of Resaca May 14–15. Cassville May 19. New Hope Church May 25. Operations on line of Pumpkin Vine Creek and battles about Dallas, New Hope Church and Allatoona Hills May 26-June 5. Operations about Marietta and against Kenesaw Mountain June 10-July 2. Pine Hill June 11–14. Lost Mountain June 15–17. Gilgal or Golgotha Church June 15. Muddy Creek June 17. Noyes Creek June 19. Kolb's Farm June 22. Assault on Kenesaw June 27. Ruff's Station, Smyrna Camp Ground, July 4. Chattahoochee River July 5–17. Peach Tree Creek July 19–20. Siege of Atlanta July 22-August 25. Operations at Chattahoochee River Bridge August 26-September 2. Occupation of Atlanta September 2-November 15. March to the sea November 15-December 10. Siege of Savannah December 10–21. Campaign of the Carolinas January to April, 1865. Robertsville, S. C., January 29, 1865. Averysboro, N. C., March 16. Battle of Bentonville March 19–21. Occupation of Goldsboro March 24 and of Raleigh April 14. Bennett's House April 26. Surrender of Johnston and his army. March to Washington, D.C., via Richmond April 29-May 20. Grand Review May 24. Mustered out June 23, 1865.

Battery lost during service 13 Enlisted men killed and mortally wounded and 1 Officer and 11 Enlisted men by disease. Total 25.

== Antietam ==
At the Battle of Antietam on 16–17 September 1862, Battery M led by George W. Cothran was armed with four 10-pounder Parrott rifles and two 3-inch Ordnance rifles. Casualties in the action were 6 wounded. A week after the battle, the battery reported 5 officers and 119 enlisted men present for duty. When XII Corps went into action at 7 pm, Cothran's battery joined the I Corps batteries north of the cornfield and engaged Confederate targets near the West Woods until late in the afternoon.

== Atlanta campaign ==
At the Battle of Kolb's Farm on 22 June 1864, Battery M commanded by Captain John D. Woodbury was armed with M1857 12-pounder Napoleons. While assisting in the defense of Alpheus S. Williams' division, the guns fired canister and spherical case shot to repulse a Confederate infantry attack.

== See also ==
- List of New York Civil War units
