= Charles Fessenden Morse =

American Union Army officer (1839–1926)

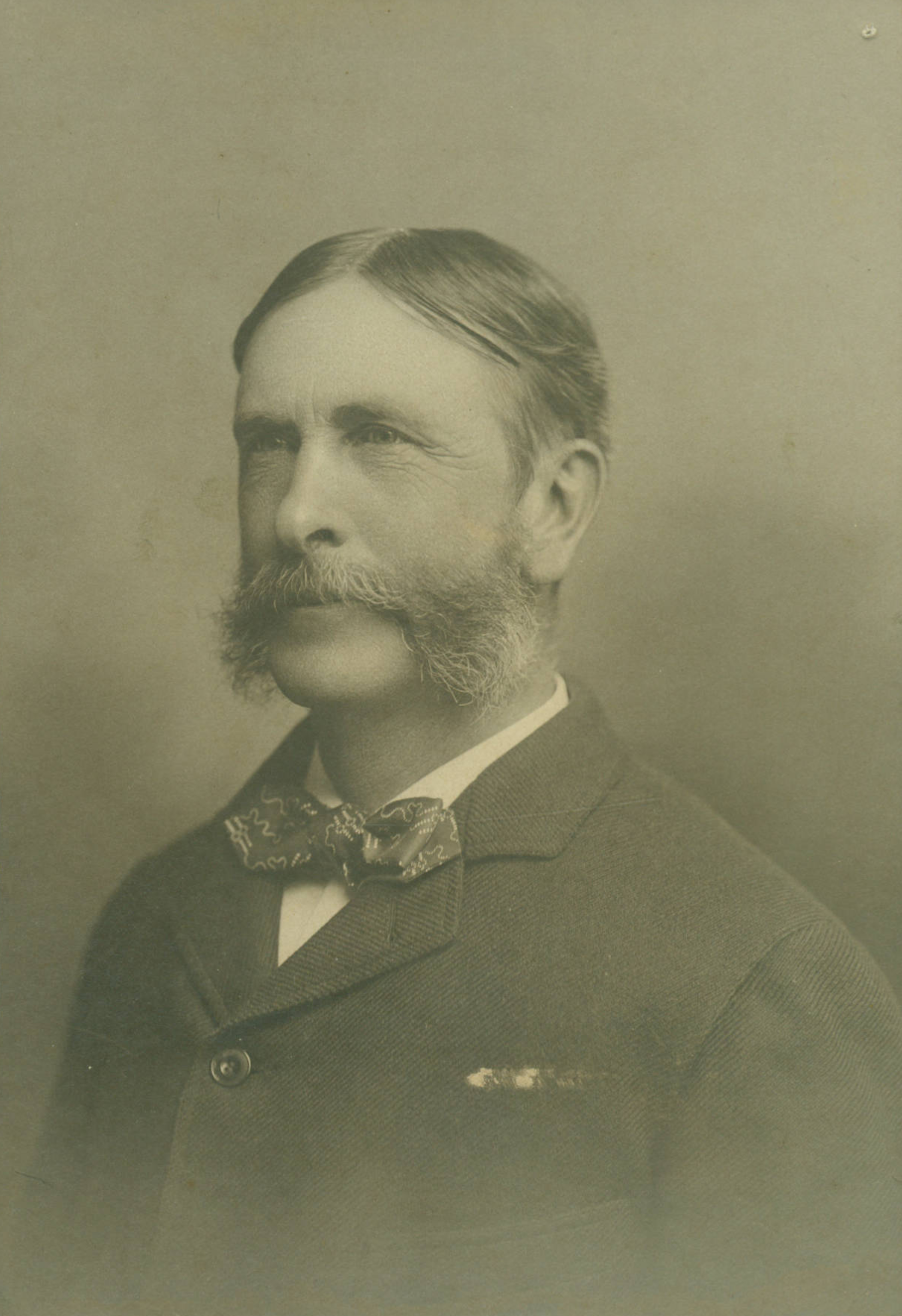
- Charles Fessenden Morse c. 1897
- Born: September 22, 1839; Boston, Massachusetts, U.S.
- Died: December 11, 1926 (aged 87)
- Burial place: Oak Grove Cemetery
- Education: Harvard University, S.B. (1858)
- Military career
- Allegiance: Union
- Branch: Union Army
- Service years: 1861–1865
- Rank: Lieutenant Colonel
- Commands: 2nd Regiment Massachusetts Volunteer Infantry
- Conflicts: Battle of Gettysburg
- Other work: Letters written during the Civil War, 1861-1865

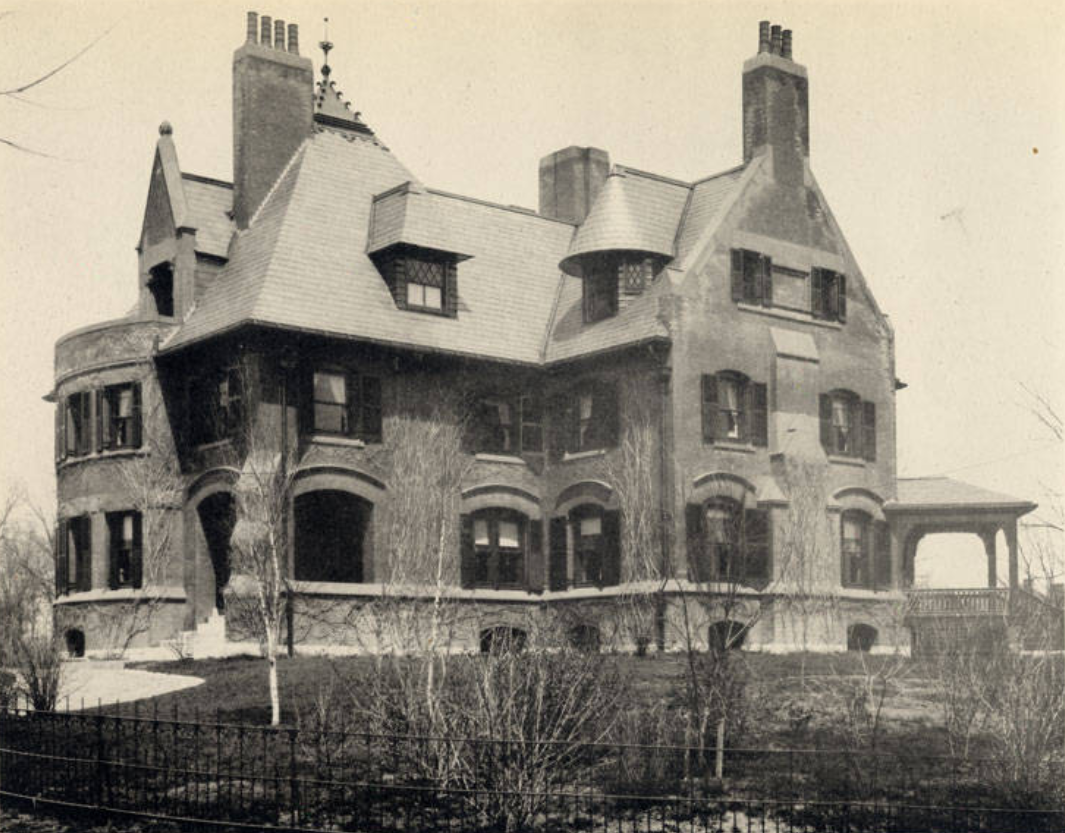
Morse's residence in Kansas City, designed by Peabody & Stearns

Charles Fessenden Morse (September 22, 1839 – December 11, 1926) was a Lieutenant Colonel in the Union Army during the American Civil War and, afterward, an influential businessman and civic leader in Kansas City, Missouri.

== Early life ==
Morse was born in Boston, and spent his childhood there. He attended Harvard University, graduating in 1858 with a S.B. degree.

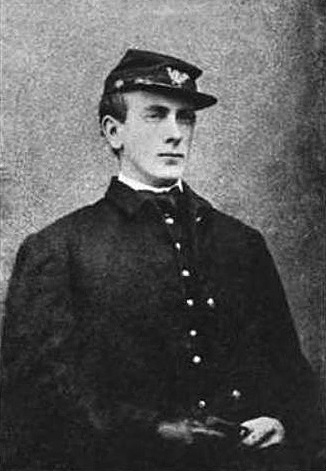
Morse in the Civil War

== Civil War ==
Soon after the start of the Civil War in 1861, Morse joined the 2nd Massachusetts Volunteer Infantry, where he fought alongside some of his Harvard classmates, including the future colonel of the 54th Massachusetts Volunteer Infantry, Robert Gould Shaw. The two became close friends, maintaining near-daily correspondence until the latter's death in the Battle of Fort Wagner in July 1863. Morse was promoted to captain of the regiment's Company B, and served in this role at the battles of Cedar Mountain, Antietam, and Chancellorsville. After Gettysburg, he was promoted to lieutenant colonel of the 2nd Massachusetts, a rank he held until the end of the war. During the Atlanta campaign waged by Union General William T. Sherman in 1864, Morse served as provost marshal of the city following its burning and Union occupation, where "[b]y all accounts, [he] kept strict order."

== Business career ==
After the war, Morse tried his hand at cotton farming in Georgia, but was unsuccessful. He traveled west in 1870 and found greater success in a series of positions in the railroad business. In 1878, Morse left his post as general manager of the Atchison, Topeka and Santa Fe Railway in Topeka, Kansas at the suggestion of his friend, Charles Francis Adams Jr., and relocated to Kansas City, where he served first as general manager and eventually president of the Kansas City Stockyards. Morse also served for several years as president of the Kansas City Metropolitan Street Railway company. He was one of the first residents of the city's exclusive Hyde Park district, a gated suburb established outside the city limits near the frontier town of Westport in 1882. During the 1880s and 1890s, Col. Morse helped establish several elite civic institutions, including The Barstow School and the Kansas City Country Club. Morse maintained a summer residence in Falmouth, Massachusetts, to which he retired in 1913.

== In popular culture ==
A young Captain Morse was portrayed by Donovan Leitch Jr. in the 1989 film Glory, though this appearance was fictionalized. (Morse is shown as an officer of the 54th Mass., while in reality he never left the 2nd Mass and never participated in the attack on Fort Wagner.) His battlefield letters to Robert Gould Shaw served as primary sources for the books that inspired the film. Lt. Colonel Morse is cited in several sections of the 2009 non-fiction novel, The Bonfire - The Siege and Burning of Atlanta, written by Marc Wortman. Lt. Colonel Morse appears in the Index eighteen times, which provides quotations and references to his military role in the Union Army and as the Provost Marshal of Atlanta following the battle of Atlanta.

== See also ==
- Robert Gould Shaw
