= 33rd Massachusetts Infantry Regiment =

Regiment of the Union Army during the American Civil War

33rd Massachusetts Volunteer Infantry
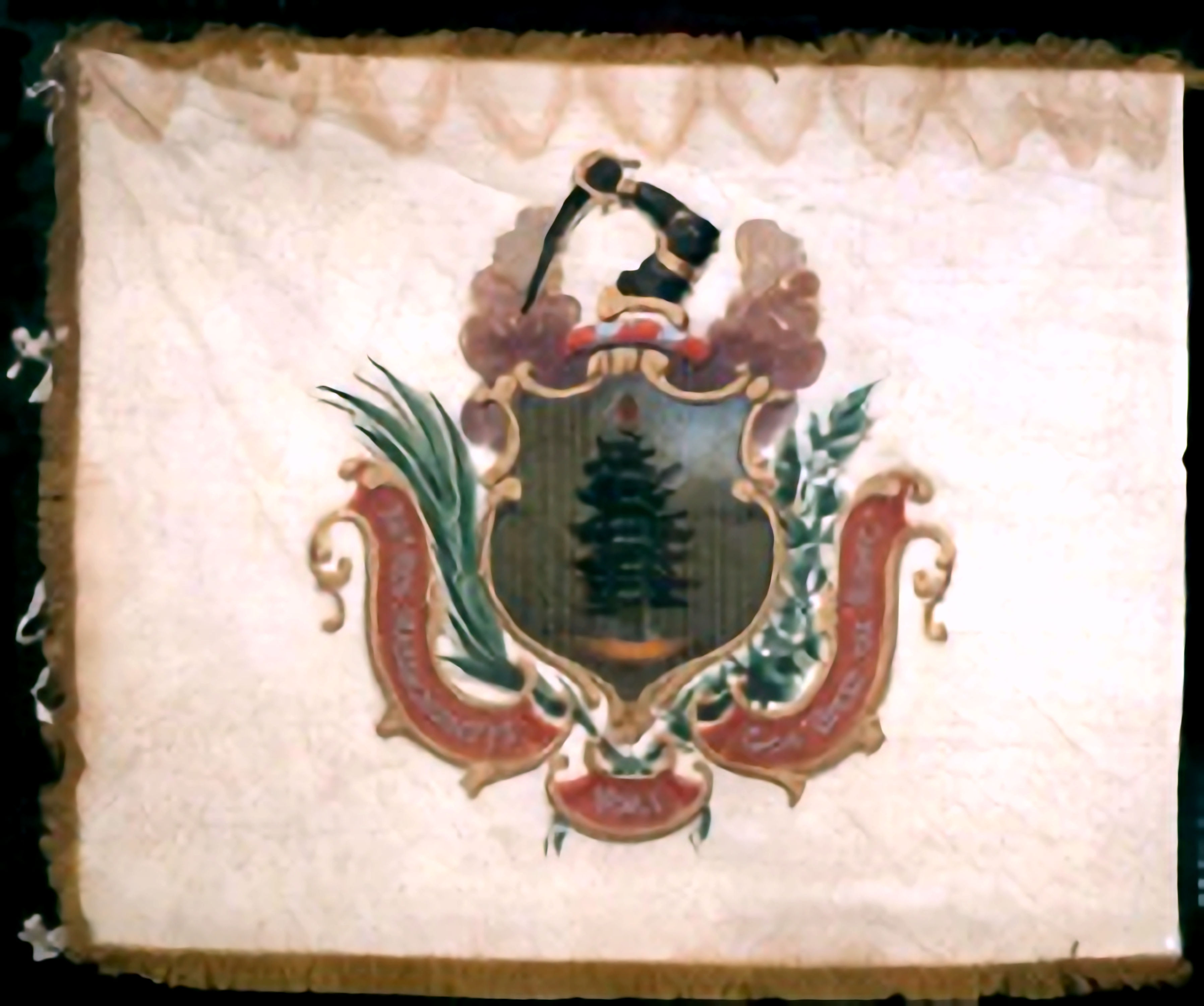
- Regimental colors of 33rd Massachusetts Volunteers
- Active: August 6, 1862 - July 2, 1865
- Country: United States
- Allegiance: Union
- Branch: Infantry
- Type: Regiment
- Engagements: Battle of Chancellorsville; Battle of Gettysburg; Battle of Wauhatchie; Battle of Missionary Ridge; Atlanta campaign; Battle of Resaca; Battle of Dallas; Battle of New Hope Church; Battle of Allatoona; Battle of Marietta; Battle of Kolb's Farm; Battle of Kennesaw Mountain; Battle of Marietta; Battle of Peachtree Creek; Siege of Atlanta; Sherman's March to the Sea; Carolinas campaign; Battle of Bentonville

Commanders
- Colonel: Adin B. Underwood
- Lieutenant Colonel: Godfrey Rider, Jr.

The 33rd Massachusetts Volunteer Infantry was an infantry regiment that served in the Union Army during the American Civil War.

== Service ==
The 33rd Regiment Massachusetts Infantry was organized at Springfield, Massachusetts and mustered in for a three-year enlistment on August 6, 1862 under the command of Colonel Adin B. Underwood.

The regiment was attached to Military District of Washington to October 1862. 2nd Brigade, 2nd Division, XI Corps, Army of the Potomac, to October 1863, and Army of the Cumberland to April 1864. 3rd Brigade, 3rd Division, XX Corps, Army of the Cumberland, to June 1865.

The 33rd Massachusetts Infantry mustered out of service on June 11, 1865 and was discharged July 2, 1865.

== Detailed service ==
Moved to Washington, D.C., August 14–17. Duty in the defenses of Washington, D.C., and provost duty at Alexandria, Va., until October 10, 1862. Moved to Fairfax Station October 10, then to Fairfax Court House and duty there until November 1. Moved to Warrenton, then to Germantown November 1–20. Marched to Fredericksburg December 10–15. Camp at Falmouth until January 20, 1863. "Mud March" January 20–24, 1863. At Falmouth until April 27. Chancellorsville Campaign April 27-May 6. Battle of Chancellorsville May 1–5. Brandy Station and Beverly Ford June 9. Gettysburg Campaign June 11-July 24. Battle of Gettysburg July 1–4. At Bristoe Station August 3-September 24. Movement to Bridgeport, Ala., September 24-October 3. March along line of Nashville & Chattanooga Railroad to Lookout Valley, Tenn., October 25–28. Battle of Wauhatchie, Tenn., October 28–29. Chattanooga-Ringgold Campaign November 23–27. Tunnel Hill November 24–25. Missionary Ridge November 25. March to relief of Knoxville November 28-December 17. Duty in Lookout Valley until May, 1864. Atlanta Campaign May to September. Demonstration on Rocky Faced Ridge May 5–11. Buzzard's Roost Gap May 8–9. Battle of Resaca May 14–15. Cassville May 19. Advance on Dallas May 22–25. Battle of New Hope Church May 25. Operations on line of Pumpkin Vine Creek and battles about Dallas, New Hope Church, and Allatoona Hills May 25-June 5. Operations about Marietta and against Kennesaw Mountain June 10-July 2. Pine Hill June 11–14. Lost Mountain June 15–17. Gilgal or Golgotha Church June 15. Muddy Creek June 17. Noyes Creek June 19. Kolb's Farm June 22. Assault on Kennesaw June 27. Ruff's Station or Smyrna Camp Ground July 4. Chattahoochie River July 5–17. Duty as division train guard July 17 to August 27. Battle of Peachtree Creek July 19–20. Siege of Atlanta July 22-August 25. Operations at Chattahoochie River Bridge August 26-September 2. Occupation of Atlanta September 2-November 15. March to the sea November 15-December 10. Siege of Savannah December 10–21. Carolinas Campaign January to April 1865. Lawtonville, S.C. February 2. Skirmish, Raleigh Road, near Fayetteville, N.C., March 14. Averysboro March 16. Battle of Bentonville March 19–21. Occupation of Goldsboro March 24. Advance on Raleigh April 10–13. Occupation of Raleigh April 14. Bennett's House April 26. Surrender of Johnston and his army. Marched to Washington, D.C., via Richmond, Va., April 29-May 20. Grand Review of the Armies May 24. Duty at Washington until June 11.

== Casualties ==
The regiment lost a total of 188 men during service; 7 officers and 104 enlisted men killed or mortally wounded, 77 enlisted men died of disease.

== Commanders ==
- Colonel Adin B. Underwood
- Lieutenant Colonel Godfrey Rider, Jr. - commanded at the Battle of Wauhatchie after Col Underwood was wounded in action

== See also ==
- List of Massachusetts Civil War Units
- Massachusetts in the American Civil War
