= Stony Creek (Virginia) =

Stony Creek (Virginia) Tributary to Nottoway River
- Location within Virginia

Location
- Country: United States
- State: Virginia
- County: Sussex; Dinwiddie

Physical characteristics
- Source: Confluence of Butterwood Creek and White Oak Creek
  - location: about 1/2 mile SW of Center Star, Virginia
  - coordinates: 37°05′06″N 77°39′46″W
  - elevation: about 172 feet amsl
- Mouth: Confluence of Stony Creek and the Nottoway River
  - location: Stony Creek, Virginia
  - coordinates: 36°56′51″N 77°22′50″W
  - elevation: about 60 feet amsl
- Length: 21 miles/34 kilometers from the confluence of Butterwood Creek and White Oak Creek

Basin features
- Progression: southeast
- River system: Nottoway River
- Tributaries
  - left: White Oak Creek; Seat Island Branch; Chamberlains Bed
  - right: Butterwood Creek; Rocky Run Creek; Hawkins Run; Mortar Branch; Black Branch; Sappony Creek
- Waterbodies: Richardsons Pond
- Bridges: Dinwiddie County 645; Dinwiddie County 647; US 1 I-85; Dinwiddie County 619; Dinwiddie County 609; Dinwiddie County 609; Dinwiddie County 670; Dinwiddie County 680; Sussex County 618; US 301; I-95

Stony Creek is a 21-mile-long (34 km) tributary of the Nottoway River in southeastern Virginia of the United States. The creek is formed by the confluence of Butterwood Creek and White Oak Creek in Dinwiddie County, Virginia.

== Course ==
Stony Creek flows east then south from the Butterwood-White Oak Creek confluence west of the town of Dinwiddie, Virginia. It flows east again south of the town. Both US 1 and I-85 have bridges over it.

Stony Creek flows east and south, where it picks up a large tributary, Sappony Creek, just north of VA 40. From here it flows a short distance east through Stony Creek, Virginia to a confluence with the Nottoway River.

== Sources ==
Stony Creek is formed at the confluence of Butterwood Creek and White Oak Creek in Dinwiddie County, Virginia. Butterwood Creek is actually longer than Stony Creek at 25 miles in length and arises near Wellville, Virginia at an elevation of nearly 400 feet amsl. Butterwood Creek then flows east through swampy areas to join White Oak Creek. White Oak Creek also arises at about 400 feet amsl and about a 1/2 mile east of Butterwood Creek near Wilsons, Virginia. White Oak Creek then flows east to Colemans Lake and then takes a bend south to join Butterwood Creek.

== Watershed ==
The watershed of Stony Creek is punctuated by swampy areas and narrow floodplains. It starts in the Piedmont of Virginia and flows east and south through a small gorge to the Coastal Plain southeast of Dinwiddie, Virginia. Once in the Coastal Plain it widens out and acquires a wide floodplain with fringing swamps.

== River Modifications ==
Stony Creek does not have any named impoundments directly on its course. However, a number of its tributaries contain impoundments. These include Twin Lakes on Butterwood Creek, Winfields Millpond and Spiers Pond on Sappony Creek and Richardsons Pond on an unnamed tributary. Stony Creek flows under eleven bridges from the Butterwood-White Oak Creek confluence to the Nottoway River.

== Geology ==
Stony Creek flows from the Piedmont to the Coastal Plain of Virginia. The forming confluence is at the edge of mafic and felsic rocks metavolcanic rocks and the Petersburg Granite. Petersburg Granite underlies most of the course and once in the Coastal Plain, it flows a short distance through the Windsor Formation and then through alluvium to the Nottoway River.

== See also ==
- List of rivers of Virginia
