= 1st District of Columbia Infantry Regiment =

1st District of Columbia Infantry
- Active: 1861–1865
- Country: United States of America
- Allegiance: Union
- Branch: Infantry
- Type: Regiment
- Part of: II Corps, Army of Virginia; XII Corps, Army of the Potomac; XXII Corps, Department of Washington
- Engagements: Battle of Cedar Mountain; Battle of Fort Stevens

Commanders
- Notable commanders: James A. Tait

The 1st District of Columbia Infantry was a Union Army infantry regiment which fought in the American Civil War.

== History ==
The regiment was organized during the summer of 1861 by James A. Tait, who served as the unit’s first colonel. After serving in garrison duties in the defenses of Washington, D.C., the regiment was sent to the Shenandoah Valley in May 1862, although it did not see any combat during the 1862 Valley Campaign. When Union forces in the Shenandoah region were consolidated into the Army of Virginia, the 1st D.C. Infantry became part of the 2nd Division, II Corps. As part of the army, it fought in the Battle of Cedar Mountain and served in reserve at the Second Battle of Bull Run. Following the campaign, the regiment was reassigned to the defenses of Washington, where it served for the remainder of the war. At first, it was part of the XII Corps of the Army of the Potomac, but was transferred to the Department of Washington.

During the Battle of Fort Stevens, the 1st District of Columbia helped defend the northern line of forts and entrenchments but failed to see any combat. On February 28, 1865, the regiment was consolidated with the 2nd District of Columbia Infantry.

== See also ==
- List of District of Columbia Civil War regiments

== Sources ==
- Civil War in the East
