= First Battle of Winchester =

American Civil War engagement in Virginia

Coordinates: 39.1773°N 78.1744°W

- Part of the American Civil War
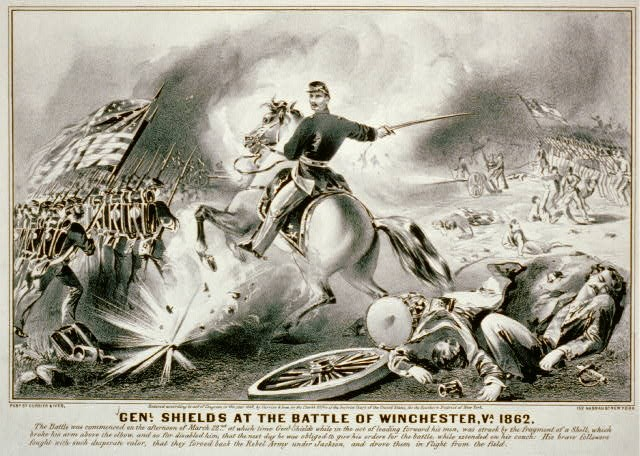
- Gen Shields at Winchester
| Date | May 25, 1862 |
| Location | Frederick County, Virginia and Winchester, Virginia |
| Result | Confederate victory |

Belligerents
| United States | Confederate States |

Commanders and leaders
| Nathaniel P. Banks | Stonewall Jackson |

Strength
| 6,500 | 16,000 |

Casualties and losses
| 2,019 (62 killed; 243 wounded; 1,714 missing) | 397 (68 killed; 329 wounded) |

The First Battle of Winchester, fought on May 25, 1862, in and around Frederick County, Virginia, and Winchester, Virginia, was a major victory in Confederate Army Maj. Gen. Thomas J. "Stonewall" Jackson's Campaign through the Shenandoah Valley during the American Civil War. Jackson enveloped the right flank of the Union Army under Maj. Gen. Nathaniel P. Banks and pursued it as it fled across the Potomac River into Maryland. Jackson's success in achieving force concentration early in the fighting allowed him to secure a more decisive victory which had escaped him in previous battles of the campaign.

== Background ==
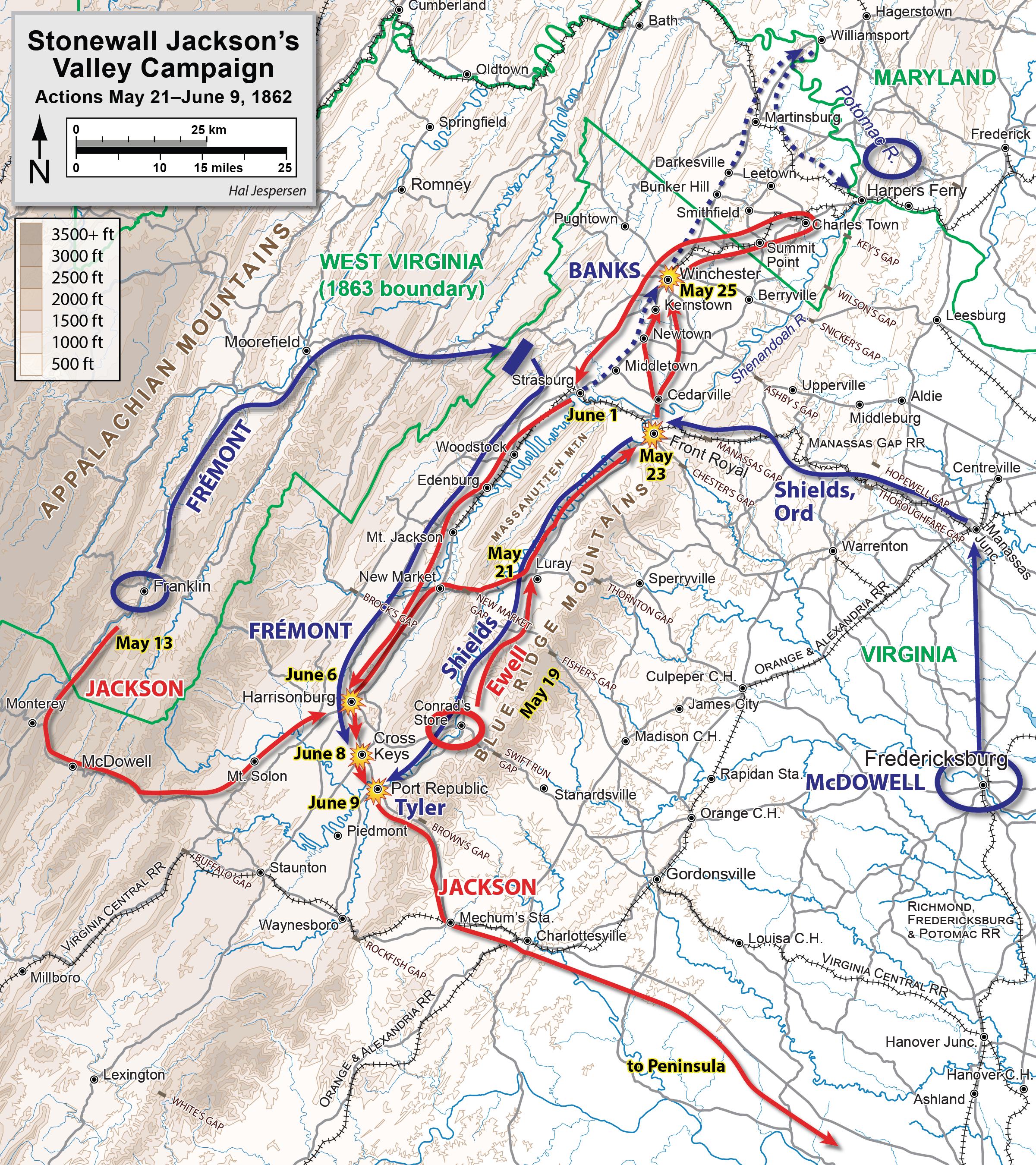
Jackson's Valley Campaign: Front Royal to Port Republic. Confederate Union

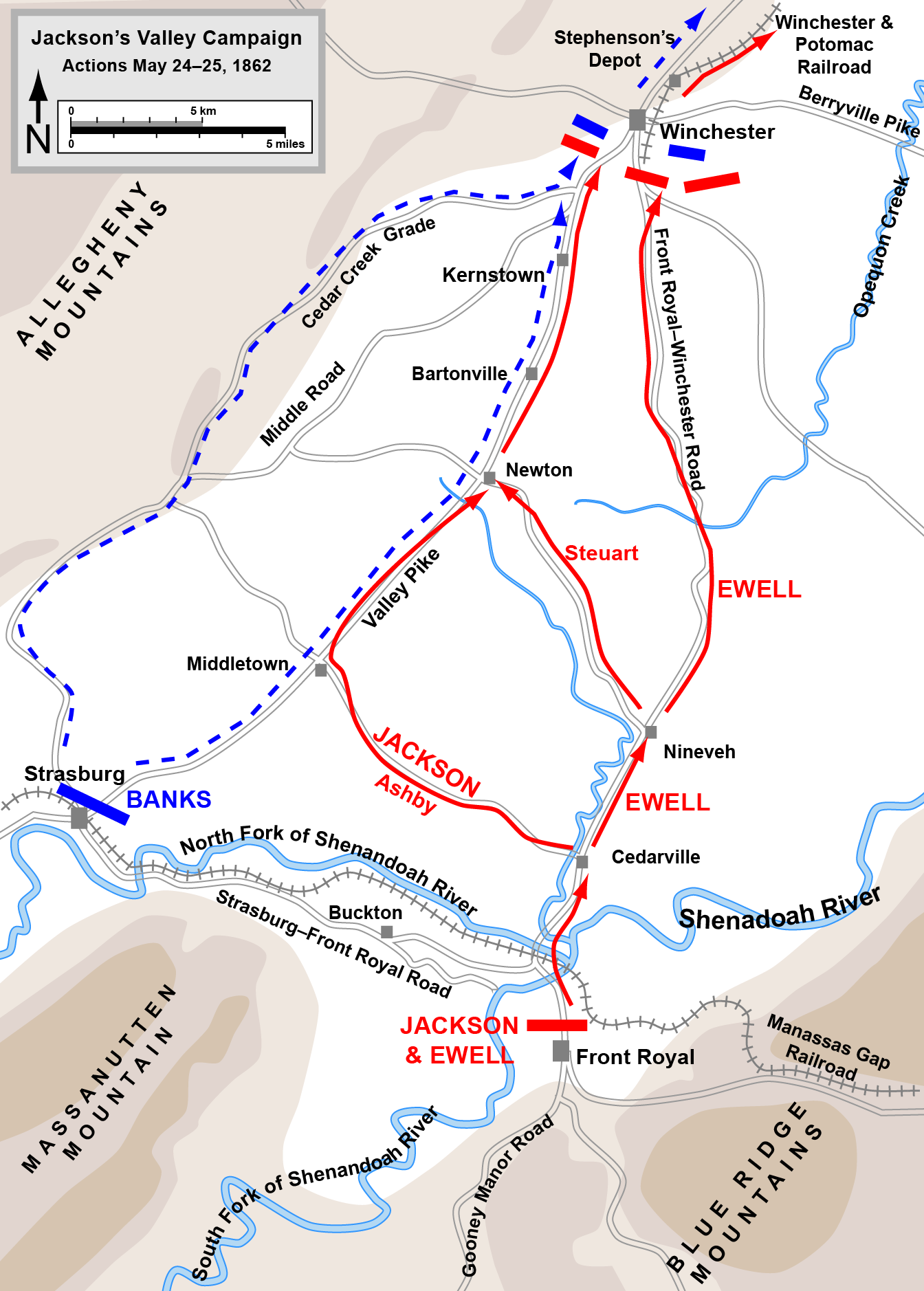
Actions from Front Royal to First Winchester, May 24–25, 1862.

Maj. Gen. Nathaniel P. Banks learned on May 24, 1862, that the Confederates had captured his garrison at Front Royal, Virginia, and were closing on Winchester, turning his position. He ordered a hasty retreat down the Valley Pike from Strasburg. His columns were attacked at Middletown and again at Newtown (Stephens City) by Jackson's converging forces. The Confederates took many Union prisoners and captured so many wagons and stores that they later nicknamed the Union general "Commissary Banks". Jackson pressed the pursuit for most of the night and allowed his exhausted soldiers only a few hours of sleep before dawn.

Banks now deployed at Winchester to slow the Confederate pursuit. He had two brigades of infantry under Colonels Dudley Donnelly and George Henry Gordon, a mixed brigade of cavalry under Brig. Gen. John P. Hatch, and 16 guns. Gordon's brigade was placed on the Union right on Bower's Hill with its left flank at the Valley Pike, supported by a battery of artillery. The center of the line (Camp Hill) was held by the cavalry supported by two guns. Donnelly's brigade was placed in a crescent on the left to cover the Front Royal and Millwood roads with the rest of the artillery. At earliest light the Confederate skirmish line advanced in force driving the Union pickets back to their main line of battle.

== Battle ==
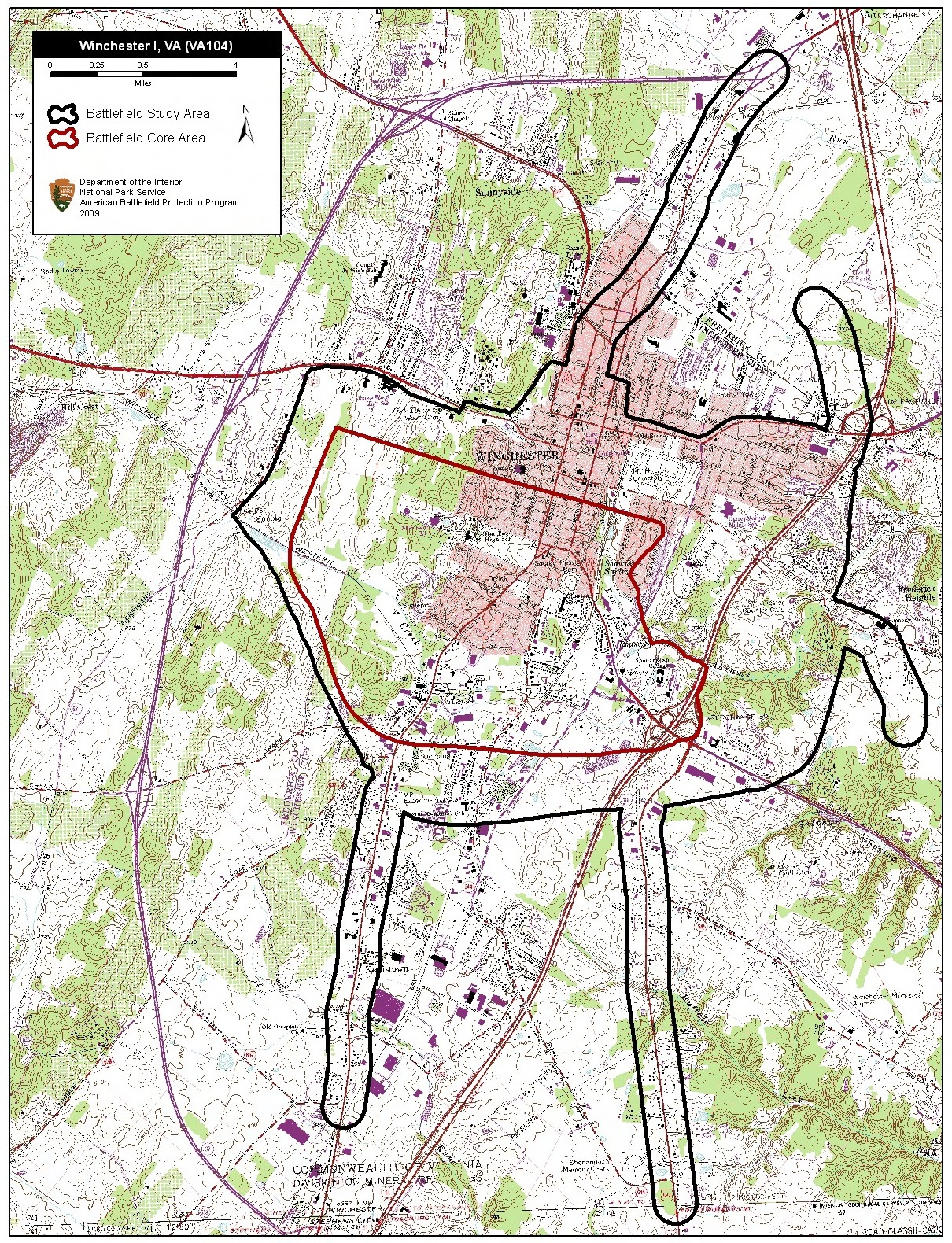
Map of Winchester I Battlefield core and study areas by the American Battlefield Protection Program.

During the night, the advance of Maj. Gen. Richard S. Ewell's division (four brigades) reached Buffalo Lick. Jackson moved three of Ewell's brigades to the left to participate in the advance on the Valley pike, leaving Ewell with just Trimble's brigade and Bradley Johnson's Maryland regiment. At dawn, he deployed Trimble's brigade astride the Front Royal Pike and advanced against the Union left flank. His leading regiments (in particular the 21st North Carolina Infantry Regiment) came under heavy fire from Union forces deployed behind stone fences and were repulsed. Confederate forces regrouped and brought up artillery. Ewell advanced the regiments of Trimble's brigade, sending regiments to either side of the high ground to enfilade the Union position. Donnelly withdrew his brigade to a position closer to town with his right flank anchored on Camp Hill. Ewell then attempted a flanking movement to the right beyond the Millwood Road, but in response to orders from Banks, Donnelly withdrew through the town.

In conjunction with Ewell's advance on the Front Royal Pike, Jackson advanced on the Valley Pike at early dawn in a heavy fog. At Jackson's command, Winder's brigade swept over a hill to the left of the pike, driving off the Union skirmishers who held it. Jackson quickly placed a section of artillery on the hill to engage Union artillery on Bower's Hill at a range of less than half a mile. Union sharpshooters along Abrams Creek began picking off the cannoneers. Jackson brought up the rest of his artillery and a duel ensued with the Union guns on Bower's Hill.

Jackson then brought up the brigades of Fulkerson, Campbell, and Elzey to support Winder. Despite numerous officers being wounded, Jackson's forces were in good order and nearly ready for an attack. He then deployed Brig. Gen. Richard Taylor's Louisiana brigade (led by the Louisiana Tigers) reinforced by two regiments of Fulkerson's brigade and backed up by Scott's brigade, to the left along Abrams Creek. Taylor marched under fire to a position overlapping the Union right and then attacked Bower's Hill. The Confederate assault swept irresistibly forward over the crest in the face of determined resistance. With three enemy brigades in its front and three coming at its right flank, Gordon's Union brigade gave way and Union soldiers began streaming back into town.

Union forces retreated through the streets of Winchester and north on the Valley Pike to Martinsburg. After resting in Martinsburg, Banks' command continued north to the Potomac River, crossing it at Williamsport. Confederate pursuit was lethargic, as the troops were exhausted from the non-stop marching of the previous week under Jackson's command. Nevertheless, many Union prisoners fell into Confederate hands. Brig. Gen. Turner Ashby's cavalry was disorganized from the actions of May 24 and did not pursue until Banks had already reached the Potomac.

== Aftermath ==
First Winchester was a major victory in Jackson's Valley Campaign, both tactically and strategically. Union plans for the Peninsula Campaign, an offensive against Richmond, were disrupted by Jackson's audacity, and thousands of Union reinforcements were diverted to the Valley and the defense of Washington, D.C.
