= George Henry Gordon =

American lawyer

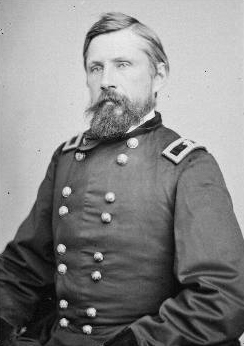
- Brig. Gen. George H. Gordon
- Born: July 19, 1823; Charlestown, Massachusetts
- Died: August 30, 1886 (aged 63); Framingham, Massachusetts
- Burial place: Framingham Centre, Framingham, Massachusetts
- Military career
- Allegiance: United States of America; Union
- Branch: United States Army; Union Army
- Service years: 1846–1854, 1861–1865
- Rank: Brigadier General; Brevet Major General
- Conflicts: Mexican–American War; Battle of Cerro Gordo; American Civil War; Jackson's Valley campaign; Battle of Antietam

George Henry Gordon (July 19, 1823 – August 30, 1886) was an American lawyer and a Union general in the American Civil War.

== Early life ==
Gordon was born in Charlestown, Massachusetts. He moved to Framingham, Massachusetts at the age of five with his widowed mother. He graduated from the United States Military Academy in 1846, 43rd in a class of 59 cadets. He served under Lt. Gen. Winfield Scott in the Mexican–American War, earning the brevet of first lieutenant for gallantry at Cerro Gordo. He resigned from the army in 1854. After taking a course in the Harvard Law School, he practiced law in Boston.

== Civil War ==
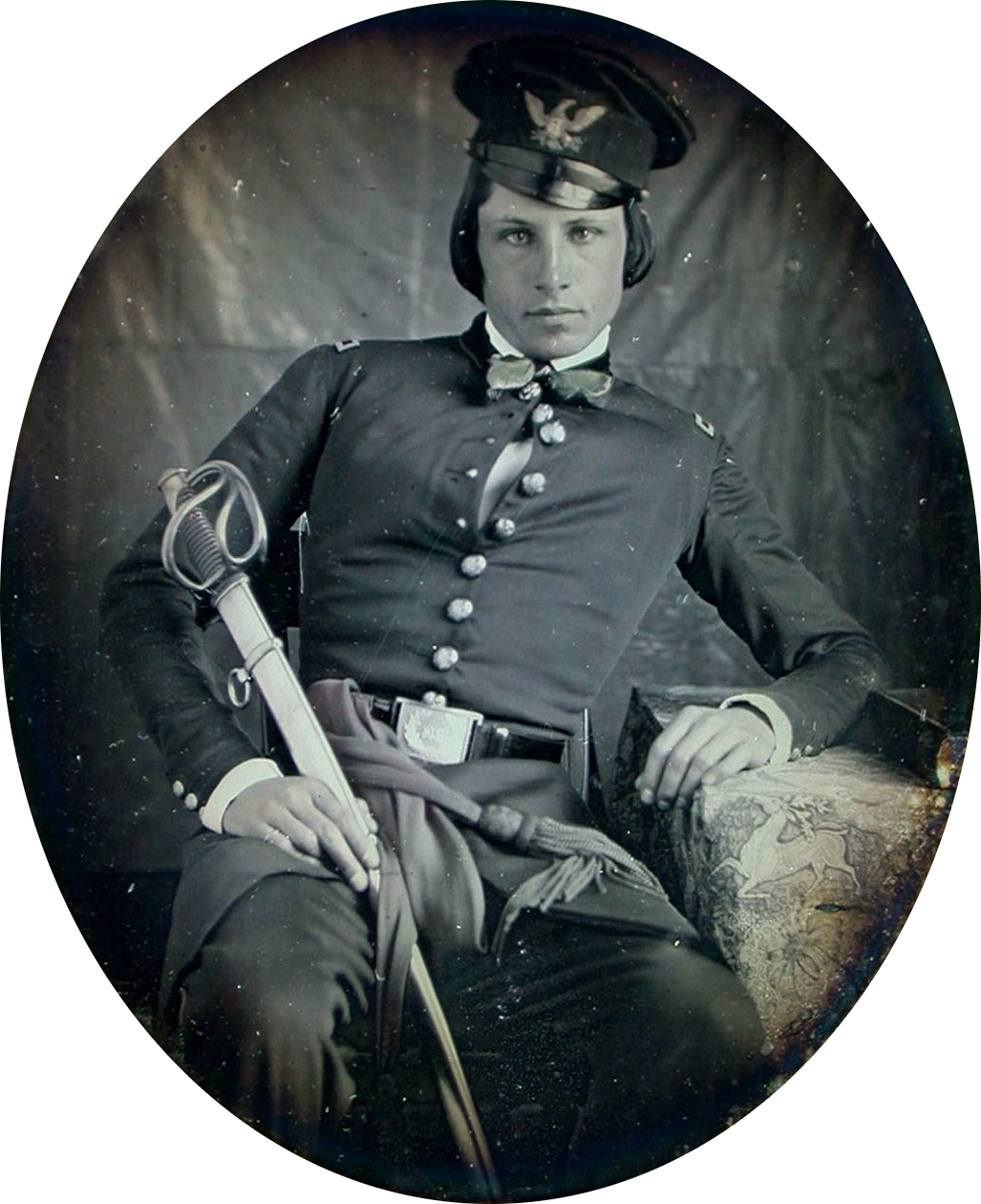
Lieutenant Gordon, ca. 1846

When the Civil War erupted in 1861, Gordon organized and became colonel of the 2nd Regiment Massachusetts Volunteer Infantry. The regiment served guarding the upper Potomac River and Frederick, Maryland, and in the spring of 1862, Gordon served under Maj. Gen. Nathaniel P. Banks, unsuccessfully opposing Maj. Gen. Stonewall Jackson in the Shenandoah Valley. Gordon was appointed a brigadier general of volunteers on June 12, 1862, to rank from June 9, 1862.

Gordon commanded a brigade in XII Corps, Army of the Potomac, at the Battle of Antietam, becoming acting division commander when Brig. Gen. Alpheus S. Williams became acting corps commander. He also took command of 1st Division, XI Corps, following the Battle of Gettysburg and was transferred with it to the Department of the South. There he commanded troops on Folly Island, South Carolina. Starting in November 1864, Gordon served in the Department of Virginia. He commanded the Eastern District of that department from February 1865 until he left the army.

Gordon served in the army until August 24, 1865. On January 13, 1866, President Andrew Johnson nominated Gordon for the award of the honorary grade of brevet major general, United States Volunteers, to rank from April 9, 1865, and the U.S. Senate confirmed the award on March 12, 1866.

== Postbellum career ==
After the war, Gordon practiced law in Boston. He was one of the founders of the Military Historical Society of Massachusetts. He published the following books:

- History of the Second Massachusetts Regiment (1876)
- History of the Campaign of the Army of Virginia under Gen. John Pope from Cedar Mountain to Alexandria (1880)
- A War Diary of the Events of the War of the Great Rebellion, 1863-65 (1882)
- Brook Farm to Cedar Mountain (1883)

Gordon died in Framingham, Massachusetts, and is buried in Framingham Centre.

== See also ==
- List of American Civil War generals (Union)
- List of Massachusetts generals in the American Civil War
- Massachusetts in the American Civil War
