= General Curtis =

General Curtis may refer to:

- Alfred Cyril Curtis (1894–1971), British Indian Army major general
- Arthur R. Curtis (1842–1925), Union Army brevet brigadier general (post-war honorary grade)
- Edward Peck Curtis (1897–1987), U.S. Army Air Corps major general
- Greely S. Curtis (1830–1897), Union Army brevet brigadier general
- Henry Curtis (British Army officer) (1888–1964), British Army major general
- Merritt B. Curtis (1892–1966), U.S. Marine Corps brigadier general
- Newton Martin Curtis (1835–1910), Union Army brigadier general and brevet major general
- Reginald Salmond Curtis (1863–1922), British Army major general
- Samuel Ryan Curtis (1805–1866), Union Army major general
