= List of Massachusetts generals in the American Civil War =

The flag of the Commonwealth of Massachusetts

There were approximately 120 general officers from Massachusetts who served in the Union Army during the American Civil War. This list consists of generals who were either born in Massachusetts or lived in Massachusetts when they joined the army (in the case of Regular Army officers, the date that they joined army might have preceded the Civil War by many years). The list includes both Regular and Volunteer Army generals as well as those who received the temporary or honorary rank of brevet brigadier general.

== Union ==
- Henry Livermore Abbott
- Charles Francis Adams Jr.
- Thomas J.C. Amory
- John F. Anderson
- George Leonard Andrews
- Nathaniel Prentice Banks
- John G. Barnard
- James Barnes
- William Francis Bartlett
- James L. Bates
- William E. Blaisdell
- Samuel Breck
- Henry Shaw Briggs
- Horace Brooks
- Sidney Burbank
- Benjamin Franklin Butler
- Sumner Carruth
- Samuel Chamberlain
- Thomas Edward Chickering
- Robert E. Clary
- William Cogswell
- Cyrus B. Comstock
- Darius N. Couch
- Robert Cowdin
- Charles H. Crane
- George H. Crosman
- Caspar Crowninshield
- James A. Cunningham
- Arthur R. Curtis
- Greely S. Curtis
- Nelson H. Davis
- Charles Devens
- Arthur F. Devereux
- Charles A. R. Dimon
- Alonzo G. Draper
- William F. Draper
- Nathan Dudley
- Thomas H. Dunham
- William Dwight
- Joseph Cushing Edmands
- Oliver Edwards
- Henry L. Eustis
- Charles Everett
- William O. Fiske
- Jones Frankle
- Arthur A. Goodell
- William Gates
- Oliver P. Gooding
- George Henry Gordon
- Patrick R. Guiney
- Edward Needles Hallowell
- Alfred S. Hartwell
- George P. Hawkes
- Joseph Hayes
- Guy Vernor Henry
- Edward Winslow Hinks
- Joseph Hooker
- Timothy Ingraham
- Horatio Jenkins Jr.
- Thomas D. Johns
- Edward F. Jones
- Erasmus D. Keyes
- John W. Kimball
- William S. King
- Ralph W. Kirkham
- Frederick W. Lander
- William H. Lawrence
- Horace C. Lee
- William Raymond Lee
- William S. Lincoln
- Charles G. Loring
- Charles Russell Lowell
- Luke Lyman
- George N. Macy
- Randolph B. Marcy
- Napoleon B. McLaughlen
- Nelson A. Miles
- Albert Ordway
- Francis A. Osborn
- Charles J. Paine
- Francis W. Palfrey
- Henry L. Patten
- Charles L. Peirson
- Josiah Pickett
- Joseph B. Plummer
- Carroll H. Potter
- George L. Prescott
- Samuel Miller Quincy
- S. Tyler Read
- Paul Joseph Revere
- Henry S. Russell
- Horace Binney Sargent
- Rufus Saxton
- Isaac F. Shepard
- Thomas Sherwin
- Augustus B. R. Sprague
- Luther Stephenson Jr.
- Isaac Stevens
- Robert H. Stevenson
- Thomas G. Stevenson
- Charles P. Stone
- Sylvanus Thayer
- William S. Tilton
- Zealous Bates Tower
- Edward D. Townsend
- Adin Ballou Underwood
- Charles F. Walcott
- Francis Amasa Walker
- George Hull Ward
- Lucius H. Warren
- Francis Washburn
- Ansel Dyer Wass
- Stephen Minot Weld Jr.
- George D. Wells
- Amiel Weeks Whipple
- Charles A. Whittier
- Edward A. Wild

== Confederate ==
- Charles Adams
- Albert Blanchard
- Charles Dimmock
- Edward A. Perry
- Albert Pike
- Daniel Ruggles
- Claudius W. Sears

== See also ==
- Massachusetts in the American Civil War
- List of Massachusetts Civil War units
