= Arthur Curtis =

Arthur Curtis may refer to:

- Arthur Hale Curtis (1881–1955), American football player and coach, gynecologist
- Arthur R. Curtis (1842–1925), Union Army officer during the American Civil War
- Arthur Curtis (rugby union) (1924–1989), Irish rugby union player
- Sir Arthur Colin Curtis, 3rd Baronet (1858–1898), of the Curtis baronets

== See also ==
- Curtis (surname)
