= Thomas H. Dunham =

- Born: July 30, 1840; Boston, Massachusetts
- Died: October 1, 1925 (aged 85); Beverly, Massachusetts
- Burial place: North Beverly Cemetery, Beverly Massachusetts
- Military career
- Allegiance: United States of America
- Branch: (United States) Union Army
- Service years: 1861–1865
- Rank: Colonel
- Commands: Company F, 11th Regiment Massachusetts Volunteer Infantry; 11th Regiment Massachusetts Volunteer Infantry
- Conflicts: American Civil War
- Awards: Brevet Brigadier General

Thomas Harrison Dunham Jr. (July 30, 1840 – October 1, 1925) was a volunteer soldier in the Union Army during the American Civil War who rose from the rank of private to colonel and in 1867 was awarded the honorary grade of brevet brigadier general, to rank from March 13, 1865.

== Early career ==
Dunham was the son of Thomas Harrison Dunham Sr. and Eliza West Dunham. His father was an entrepreneur in cotton textiles manufacturing and ropemaking, primarily in Boston and Plymouth, Massachusetts. Before the Civil War, Dunham worked as a shipping clerk in Boston.

== Civil War service ==
Soon after the start of the Civil War, Dunham assisted with the recruitment of a company of infantry in Boston. Although he first enlisted as a private, Dunham was almost immediately promoted to corporal on May 8, 1861. In June 1861, his company became Company F of the 11th Regiment Massachusetts Volunteer Infantry. The regiment departed for Washington, D.C., on June 29, 1861.

Arriving at Washington on July 3, the 11th Massachusetts became part of the First Brigade, Third Division of Brigadier General Irvin McDowell's army. On July 21, 1861, the 11th Massachusetts took part in the First Battle of Bull Run, the first major land battle of the Civil War. During the engagement, which resulted in the full retreat of the Union army, the 11th Massachusetts suffered relatively minor casualties and primarily acted in support of Rickett's artillery battery. During Bull Run, Dunham was given a Battlefield promotion to sergeant.

Dunham spent the winter of 1861 to 1862 encamped with the 11th Massachusetts near Washington while the Union army trained and prepared for the Peninsular Campaign. At the start of the campaign, the regiment was engaged in the Battle of Williamsburg on May 5, 1862, taking serious casualties. For their conduct during the battle, the Governor John Andrew of Massachusetts awarded the unit a new regimental battle flag. During the remainder of the Peninsular campaign, the 11th Massachusetts was primarily engaged in picket duty. They played a minor role in the Seven Days Battles being engaged in the Battles of Savage's Station and Malvern Hill.

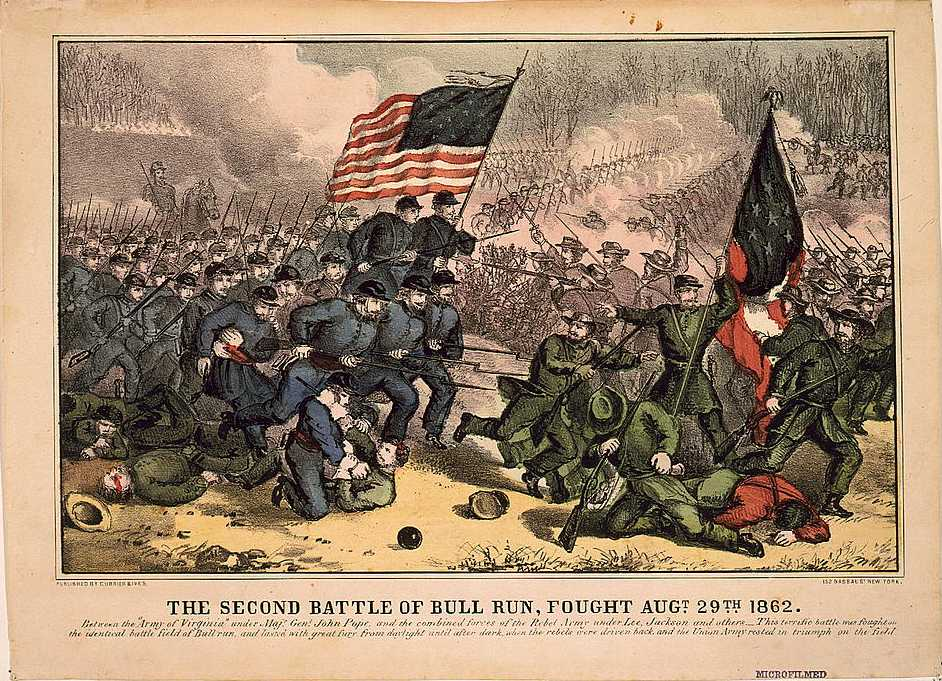
Union forces temporarily break through the Confederate lines during the Second Battle of Bull Run

After the failure of the Peninsular Campaign, the 11th Massachusetts next saw combat during the Second Battle of Bull Run on August 28, 1862. As part of Brigadier General Cuvier Grover's brigade (Second Brigade, Third Division of the III Corps), the 11th Massachusetts led its brigade in a charge on the entrenched position of the Confederates along an unfinished railroad bed. After fierce hand-to-hand combat, the charge of Grover's brigade broke through the enemy position. As Colonel William E. Blaisdell, commanding officer of the 11th Massachusetts, wrote, "The enemy broke in confusion and ran, numbers throwing away their muskets." Historians, including John J. Hennessy, have claimed that the breakthrough of Grover's brigade might have resulted in a Union victory if the breach had been exploited and reinforced. However, Union reinforcements did not arrive, Grover's brigade were surrounded and forced to retreat back over the unfinished railroad, suffering severe casualties. 40 percent of the 11th Massachusetts were killed, wounded, or captured. During this action, Dunham was again promoted, this time to first sergeant.

The 11th Massachusetts was present for but did not take part in the Battle of Fredericksburg. After this battle, the regiment went into winter camp with the rest of the Army of the Potomac in the vicinity of Falmouth, Virginia. While in winter camp, Dunham was promoted to sergeant major on February 5, 1863, and then, on the next day, he received a commission as a second lieutenant. Dunham's regiment was heavily engaged during the Battle of Chancellorsville on May 2, 1863. At Chancellorsville, Dunham was seriously wounded. He recovered and was promoted to first lieutenant. Dunham was again seriously wounded during the Battle of the Wilderness on May 6, 1864.

Dunham was promoted to captain and the command of Company F of the 11th Massachusetts in June 1864, however, due to the severity of his wound, he was forced to accept an administrative position as assistant adjutant general of the Third Brigade, Second Division of the II Corps. In this capacity he played a key role in assisting Col. Thomas Alfred Smyth who commanded the brigade.

In October 1864, Dunham returned to his former regiment and was promoted to the command of the 11th Massachusetts. After more than three years of duty, the unit was but a small fraction of its original size and therefore Dunham was not immediately promoted to colonel (as most regimental commanders were). In January 1865, he was promoted to major. He was recognized for his service during the Siege of Petersburg with a promotion to colonel. Dunham mustered out of the army on July 14, 1865, after more than four years of service. On March 29, 1867, President Andrew Johnson nominated Dunham for the award of the honorary grade of brevet brigadier general, to rank from March 13, 1865, and the U.S. Senate confirmed the award on April 5, 1867.

== Post-war ==
After the war, Dunham worked as a United States Customs official in Boston. He married Helen A. Griffin and they had six children.

== See also ==
- List of Massachusetts generals in the American Civil War
- Massachusetts in the American Civil War
