= Tremlett =

Tremlett is a surname. Notable people with the surname include:

- Andrew Tremlett (born 1964), British Church of England priest
- Chris Tremlett (born 1981), former English cricketer
- David Tremlett (born 1945), English/Swiss artist and sculptor
- George Tremlett (1939–2021), English politician
- Giles Tremlett (born 1962), English journalist and author
- Henry Martyn Tremlett (1833–1865), Lieutenant-colonel in the American Civil War
- Maurice Tremlett (1923–1984), English cricketer and father of Tim Tremlett
- Rex Tremlett (1903–1986), British-South African miner and writer
- Sarah Tremlett (born 1956), English poet and filmmaker
- Thomas Tremlett (1834–1894), English cricketer and lawyer
- Tim Tremlett (born 1956), former English county cricketer and father of Chris Tremlett
- Tony Tremlett (bishop) (1914–1992), Bishop of Dover
- Tony Tremlett (priest) (1937–2016), Anglican archdeacon
