= General Dunham =

General Dunham may refer to:

- Bill Dunham (born 1961), Royal Marines brigadier general
- Thomas H. Dunham (1840–1925), Union Army colonel later awarded the honorary grade of brevet brigadier general
- William D. Dunham (1920–1990), U.S. Air Force brigadier general
