= Robert E. Clary =

Robert Emmet Clary
- Born: March 21, 1805; Ashfield, Massachusetts, U.S.
- Died: January 19, 1890 (aged 84); Washington, D.C., U.S.
- Burial place: Oak Hill Cemetery; Washington, D.C., U.S.
- Spouse: Esther Philipson (m. 1829)
- Children: 5
- Military career
- Allegiance: United States of America; Union
- Branch: United States Army; Union Army
- Service years: 1828 – 1869
- Rank: Colonel; Brevet Brigadier General
- Conflicts: American Civil War

Robert Emmet Clary (March 21, 1805 – January 19, 1890) was a career soldier in the United States Army. Graduating from the United States Military Academy at West Point, New York, in 1828, he served in the quartermaster corps for most of his career. At the end of the American Civil War, he was awarded the honorary grade of brevet brigadier general.

== Early life ==
Born March 21, 1805, in Ashfield, Massachusetts, the second son of Electa (Smith) and Ethan Allen Clary was named after the recently executed Irish patriot Robert Emmet. Their family could trace its line back to John and Sarah Clary who arrived in Watertown in 1640. The younger Clarys were raised in a house at Benton Park, at the corner of State and Federal streets in Springfield, where their father clerked a few blocks away at the armory. Springfield's Walnut Street was named after the trees which lined the Clary property.

Appointed to the U. S. Military Academy in 1823, Clary graduated thirteenth in his class of 1828. Commissioned a second lieutenant in the 5th U.S. Infantry Regiment, Clary, like many in his class, was sent to the Jefferson Barracks at St. Louis, Missouri. On March 31, 1829, Clary married his first wife, Esther Philipson, the daughter of a prosperous merchant family; West Point classmate Jefferson Davis served as his best man.

== Military career ==
Clary served at various stations throughout the country prior to the Civil War. By 1861, he had been promoted to major and was chief quartermaster of the Department of Utah.

=== Civil War ===
Shortly after the outbreak of the Civil War, Clary was appointed chief quartermaster for the Department of West Virginia. In July 1862, he served as chief quartermaster of the short-lived Army of Virginia in the summer of 1862 under the command of Major General John Pope. After that command was absorbed by the Army of the Potomac, Clary served as chief quartermaster in several army departments until August 1864, when he was placed in charge of the Memphis army depot, in which capacity he served until the end of the war. On June 30, 1866, President Andrew Johnson nominated Clary for the award of the honorary grade of brevet brigadier general, U.S.A., (Regular Army), to rank from March 13, 1865, and the U.S. Senate confirmed the award on July 25, 1866.

=== Post-Civil War ===
Clary retired from the army on February 22, 1869, as a colonel. He died on January 19, 1890, in Washington, D.C. and was buried in Oak Hill Cemetery.

== Family ==
Clary had several brothers and sisters, one of whom, retired U.S. Navy commodore Albert Gallatin Clary, was still living at the time of his older brother's death. Clary's first marriage to Esther produced five children who lived to adulthood. Son Robert, Jr. would follow his father into the army, dying as captain in 1864. One daughter, Maria Louisa, married Charles Pomeroy Stone before the war, and died in 1862, leaving Stone with one infant daughter.

== See also ==
- List of Massachusetts generals in the American Civil War
- Massachusetts in the American Civil War
