= Henry Livermore Abbott =

Union Army general (1842–1864)

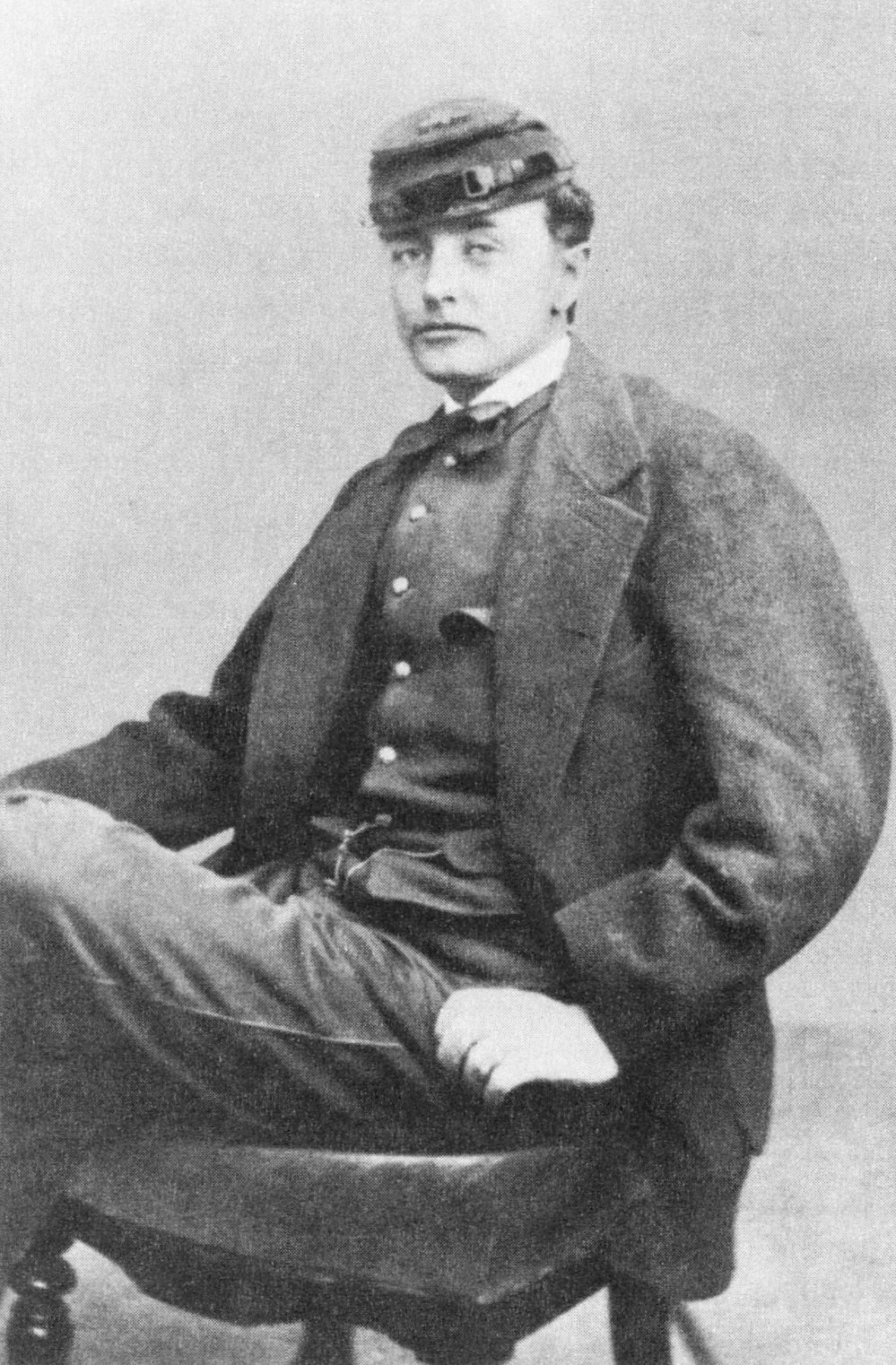
- Born: January 21, 1842; Lowell, Massachusetts, U.S.
- Died: May 6, 1864 (aged 22); Battle of the Wilderness, Virginia, U.S.
- Burial place: Lowell Cemetery; Lowell, Massachusetts, U.S.
- Relatives: Josiah Gardner Abbott (father)
- Military career
- Allegiance: United States of America; Union
- Branch: United States Army; Union Army
- Service years: 1861–1864
- Rank: Major; Bvt. Brigadier General (posthumous)
- Commands: 20th Massachusetts Volunteer Infantry
- Conflicts: American Civil War; Battle of Ball's Bluff; Peninsula Campaign; Battle of Fair Oaks; Battle of Glendale; Battle of Malvern Hill; Battle of Fredericksburg; Battle of Chancellorsville; Battle of Gettysburg; Battle of Bristoe Station; Battle of the Wilderness (DOW)

Henry Livermore Abbott (January 21, 1842 – May 6, 1864) was a Major in the Union Army during the American Civil War (Civil War). Abbott was posthumously awarded the grade of brevet brigadier general, United States Volunteers, to rank from August 1, 1864, and the grades of brevet lieutenant colonel, brevet colonel and brevet brigadier general, United States Army, all to rank from March 13, 1865 for gallant and meritorious services at the Battle of the Wilderness, where he was killed in action. Abbott was engaged at the center of several key Civil War battles and was widely known and admired for his leadership, courage and composure under fire.

== Early life ==
Henry Livermore Abbott, the third of eleven children, was born in Lowell, Massachusetts on January 21, 1842, the son of Josiah Gardner Abbott, a successful lawyer and judge. In 1876, Josiah Gardner Abbott was elected to the United States House of Representatives. He was a prominent member of the Democratic Party. Henry's mother, Caroline, was the daughter of U.S. Congressman Edward St. Loe Livermore. Both of Henry's parents were descended from officers who served in the Continental Army during the American Revolutionary War.

Henry was a prodigy and in 1856 he enrolled in Harvard University at age 14 with his older brother Edward ("Ned"). The brothers roomed together at a fashionable private boarding house near campus. The young Henry found the rigid atmosphere at Harvard "irksome" and was frequently admonished for "indecorum at prayers," "neglect of mathematics," and "tardiness at recitation." Nonetheless, Henry graduated from Harvard in the middle of the class in 1860. He was reading law in his father's law office when the Civil War broke out.

=== Initial reluctance to volunteer and enrollment in Union Army ===
Henry's father obtained an appointment for Henry as a captain in the 2d Massachusetts Volunteer Infantry Regiment after the Confederates attacked Fort Sumter. Henry declined this appointment and, in May 1861, he joined the Fourth Battalion Massachusetts Volunteer Militia along with several of his friends, including his best friend, future United States Supreme Court Justice Oliver Wendell Holmes Jr. After Holmes and several other friends left to join the 20th Massachusetts Volunteer Infantry Regiment, Abbott joined that regiment on July 10, 1861. At the end of August 1861, Abbott was commissioned a second lieutenant in the 20th Massachusetts Infantry, which became known as the "Harvard Regiment" because so many of its officers were Harvard graduates.

Abbott initially was more reluctant than his older brother, Ned, and his younger brother, Fletcher, to enlist. He wrote to his father that he was more literary and domestic than his brothers, but that he would be ashamed of himself forever if he did not do anything in the time of crisis. Many of the soldiers in Abbott's company were sailors and fishermen from Nantucket. The first commander of the 20th Massachusetts Infantry Regiment was Colonel William Raymond Lee, a United States Military Academy graduate and professional soldier.

== American Civil War service ==
=== Ball's Bluff, the Peninsula, Seven Days' Battles ===
On October 21, 1861, Abbott's 20th Massachusetts Volunteer Infantry Regiment was ordered to cross the Potomac River from their camp at Poolesville, Maryland and with other Union Army units to make a demonstration towards Leesburg, Virginia. This foray resulted in the comparatively minor Battle of Ball's Bluff, Virginia. The small battle had large consequences as the poorly scouted and coordinated movement of Union Army forces led to the rout of the Union force and the death of Colonel and U.S. Senator Edward Dickinson Baker, a close friend of President Abraham Lincoln. The U.S. Congress thereafter established the Joint Committee on the Conduct of the War, which bedeviled generals and others for the rest of the war. The consequences were severe for the 20th Massachusetts Infantry Regiment as well. The regiment suffered casualties of 30 percent killed and wounded and 37 percent captured. The Confederates routed the Union forces just after they had crossed the Potomac River from Maryland into Loudoun County, Virginia, scaled steep bluffs, crossed a field and run into the Confederate States Army forces hidden in the woods on the other side. Abbott ordered the men of his company to fight lying down, but he continued to direct them from a standing and walking position. Despite Abbott's brave attempt to hold the line, the 20th Massachusetts Infantry and other Union troops were steadily forced back. The line finally broke and many men leaped over the bluffs and some tried to swim across the Potomac River and drowned. Others drowned when the overloaded boats in which they tried to recross the river capsized. Abbott and Captain William F. Bartlett led survivors of the 20th Massachusetts Infantry up the river to Smart's Mill, where they found a rowboat and got everyone across the river into Maryland under cover of darkness. The 20th Massachusetts Infantry Regiment held up well compared to most other Union regiments at Ball's Bluff but lost 87 of 300 men as killed and wounded and 111 as prisoners, including Colonel Lee, in its efforts to hold the Union line.

Abbott was promoted to first lieutenant on November 8, 1861. After rebuilding its strength for four and one-half months at Poolesville, Maryland, the 20th Massachusetts Volunteer Infantry Regiment took part in the Peninsula Campaign. They were engaged especially at the Battle of Fair Oaks, where the regiment lost 28 men killed and wounded out of about 350. Later the 20th Massachusetts Infantry helped cover Major General George B. McClellan's retreat during the Seven Days' Battles. On June 30, 1862, Abbott was wounded in the right arm at the Battle of Glendale, which compelled him to leave the regiment temporarily in order to recuperate at home. He refused to leave the field, however, until after the Battle of Malvern Hill the next day. On August 9, 1862, Abbott's brother Ned was killed in action at the Battle of Cedar Mountain.

=== Fredericksburg, Mud March, Second Fredericksburg ===
On September 2, 1862, Abbott's regiment covered the retreat of the defeated forces of Union Major General John Pope after the Second Battle of Manassas or Bull Run. Weeks of hard duty took their toll on Abbott, who was not fully recovered from the wound he suffered at the Battle of Glendale. Abbott missed the Battle of Antietam because he was hospitalized with typhoid fever and grief over the death of his brother at Cedar Mountain. The 20th Massachusetts Infantry again suffered heavy losses at Antietam. Soon after the battle, Abbott's brother Fletcher, who was suffering from dysentery, joined him in the hospital. Abbott recovered by November 1862 and returned to the regiment camped at Falmouth, Virginia across the Rappahannock River from Fredericksburg, Virginia. He was accompanied on his return by Holmes, who was returning after recovery from a wound suffered at the battle of Antietam.

Abbott next courageously led his men at the Battle of Fredericksburg. Due to the absence of Colonel Lee, Captain George Macy was acting colonel, and Abbott was acting major of the regiment. In preliminary street fighting on the eve of the battle, Abbott was one of the few officers in the 20th Massachusetts Infantry not to be killed or wounded, when he and his men engaged in fierce combat against the 21st Mississippi Infantry Regiment commanded by Abbott's Harvard classmate and friend, Lieutenant Lane Brandon. Abbott's men drove Confederate forces away from the river so Union Army engineers could complete pontoon bridges for a crossing in force. Thirty of the 60 men that Abbott had led into combat had been killed or wounded. Overall, 113 of the 335 men in the regiment became casualties that day. The next day, Abbott participated with his regiment in the disastrous Union Army assault on Marye's Heights where waves of Union attackers were cut down by Confederate artillery and infantry protected by a stone wall. Abbott survived unscathed, although a bullet did hit his scabbard. Sixty men and three officers were killed in a matter of minutes in the attack on Marye's Heights, bringing the losses of the 20th Massachusetts Infantry in the battle to 168 men and 8 officers of 335 men and officers engaged. Abbott largely blamed Republican political leadership for the losses because they had removed Major General George McClellan, a fellow Democrat, from command of the Army of the Potomac.

After the infamous "Mud March" of January 1863, Major General Joseph Hooker replaced Major General Ambrose Burnside as commanding general of the Army of the Potomac. In late March, Henry's 9–year old brother, Arthur, died from "the croup." After two weeks in Boston following Arthur's death, Henry returned to his regiment. On May 3, 1863, Abbott fought with his regiment during the Second Battle of Fredericksburg, Virginia, which was part of the Chancellorsville Campaign. Major General John Sedgwick, commander of the "grand division" of which the 20th Massachusetts Infantry was a part, was ordered to take Fredericksburg and then come to the aid of the bulk of the Union Army which came under heavy attack from Confederate forces at Chancellorsville. The 20th Massachusetts Volunteer Infantry Regiment was on the far right of the line and suffered only 2 dead and 13 wounded, one of whom was Oliver Wendell Holmes Jr. who was wounded for the third time. In this battle, the Union troops overwhelmed the more lightly defended Marye's Heights. Sedgwick was stopped from joining Hooker at nearby Chancellorsville by Confederate forces at the Battle of Salem Church. Brigadier General John Gibbon's division, including the 20th Massachusetts Infantry Regiment, which had been left to hold the line at Fredericksburg, had to retreat across the Rappahannock River to join Hooker and Sedgwick, who had recrossed the river further upstream.

=== Gettysburg, Pickett's Charge and Bristoe Station ===
On June 5, 1863, Hooker realized that Confederate General Robert E. Lee was moving his army north and began to follow them, keeping the Army of the Potomac between Washington, D.C. and Lee's forces. President Lincoln accepted Hooker's resignation as commanding general of the Army of the Potomac on June 27, 1863 and appointed Major General George Gordon Meade to replace him. The 20th Massachusetts Volunteer Infantry Regiment, under its new colonel, Paul J. Revere, grandson of the hero of the American Revolution of the same name, arrived in its position on Cemetery Ridge at Gettysburg, Pennsylvania on July 2, 1863, the second day of the Battle of Gettysburg. Although not moved to the front line until later that night, the 20th Massachusetts Infantry came under shelling on the evening of July 2, 1863. Eleven officers or men of the regiment were killed or severely wounded, including Colonel Revere, who was mortally wounded. The 20th Massachusetts Infantry was moved into the center of the line, about 100 yards to the left of a copse of trees that constituted the Union center and was main objective pointed out by General Lee. The Confederate bombardment of Union positions on Cemetery Ridge at Gettysburg on the afternoon of July 3, 1863 was generally high and beyond the front line although the 20th Massachusetts Infantry Regiment did suffer a few casualties during the shelling. The bombardment was followed by Pickett's Charge which the 20th Massachusetts Volunteer Infantry took a key part in repelling. Abbott was one of three unwounded officers in the regiment during Pickett's Charge and assumed command of the regiment when his superiors were wounded. The 20th Massachusetts Infantry waited until the Confederates were close to the Union line and then unleashed murderous volleys, which broke the Confederate Army's advance at that point. Realizing that they had repulsed the Confederate advance at great loss to the attackers, the Massachusetts soldiers began to shout "Fredericksburg, Fredericksburg" as they believed they had avenged their defeat and loss in that terrible battle. Then, Abbott had his men turn to help beat off the Confederate attack on the Union line at the copse of trees, which was at the very heart of the battle (the high water mark of the Confederacy). Although the battle had been won, over half of the enlisted men and 10 of the 13 officers of the 20th Massachusetts Volunteer Infantry had been killed or wounded.

After the battle, Abbott remained in command of the regiment and was promoted to major on October 10, 1863. Four days later, the 20th Massachusetts Infantry fought in the small but sharp action at Bristoe Station, Virginia. Union forces were surprised by the attack of Confederate Lieutenant General A. P. Hill's men. The 20th Massachusetts Volunteer Infantry took few casualties, however, because they were able to fight from behind a steep railroad grade. After Major General Meade demonstrated against Confederate forces at the battle of Mine Run Creek, the Army of the Potomac went into winter quarters at Brandy Station, Virginia. In December 1863, Abbott received a 15-day leave to visit home, which was extended by 20 days due to his suffering from chronic diarrhea. In January 1864, Abbott left home to rejoin his regiment.

=== Death at the Wilderness ===
On May 4, 1864, newly appointed General-in-Chief of the Union Armies and Lieutenant General Ulysses S. Grant began his drive south into Virginia that became known as the Overland Campaign. Although two sources state that Abbott remained in command of the 20th Massachusetts Volunteer Infantry until his death, another source says that Colonel George N. Macy returned to the regiment just before the Battle of the Wilderness on May 5–6, 1864, and that Abbott again assumed command of the regiment after Colonel Macy was wounded. At the Battle of the Wilderness, on May 6, 1864, Major Henry Abbott was shot in the abdomen while encouraging his command from an exposed, standing position, after he ordered his men to fight while lying down, as he had done at the Battle of Ball's Bluff. Mortally wounded, Henry Livermore Abbott died at a field hospital on the same day.

== Brevet awards and posthumous praise ==
Henry Livermore Abbott's service and exploits had gained him some notoriety, so news of his death was met with consternation and grief at the highest levels of command and back in Lowell, Massachusetts. Holmes later said that Abbott was a friend whose death "seemed to end a portion of our life also."

On December 12, 1864, President Abraham Lincoln nominated Major Abbott for the award of the honorary grade of brevet brigadier general, United States Volunteers, to rank from August 1, 1864. The United States Senate confirmed the award on February 20, 1865. On February 15, 1867, President Andrew Johnson nominated Major Abbott for the award of the honorary grades of brevet lieutenant colonel, brevet colonel, and brevet brigadier general, United States Army (Regular Army), to rank from March 13, 1865. The U. S. Senate confirmed the awards on March 2, 1867.

Abbott has been said to have been the most widely known and admired officer of his grade (or "rank") in the Army of the Potomac. Major General John Sedgwick said that Abbott was "a wonderfully good soldier" and "a bright, particular star." Major General Winfield Scott Hancock said "his reputation was built upon a solid foundation, and the closest scrutiny could not diminish it." Abbott's extensive correspondence with his family provides an especially good record of the engagements in which he fought and the generals and other personalities with whom he came into contact. Yet, over 90 percent of it remained unpublished until 1991.

Henry Livermore Abbott's good friend, future United States Supreme Court Justice Oliver Wendell Holmes Jr., who served in the 20th Massachusetts Volunteer Infantry Regiment with him, deeply admired Abbott for his courage and unruffled calm, and for his determination to do his duty even though he was deeply skeptical of Union war aims (except for preservation of the Union), was politically opposed to President Lincoln, and did not support the abolition of slavery because he thought it would die out in the near future. Holmes considered Abbott an ideal soldier, and praised him in a famous 1884 Memorial Day speech stating that: "In action he was sublime."

== See also ==
- List of American Civil War generals (Union)
- List of Massachusetts generals in the American Civil War
- Massachusetts in the American Civil War
