= John F. Anderson (general) =

American Union Army general (1832–1902)

John Francis Anderson
- Born: December 4, 1832
- Died: April 19, 1902 (aged 69); Portland, Maine, U.S.
- Military career
- Allegiance: United States
- Branch: United States Army; Union Army
- Service years: 1861–1865
- Rank: Major; Brevet Brigadier General
- Unit: 24th Massachusetts Infantry Regiment
- Conflicts: American Civil War

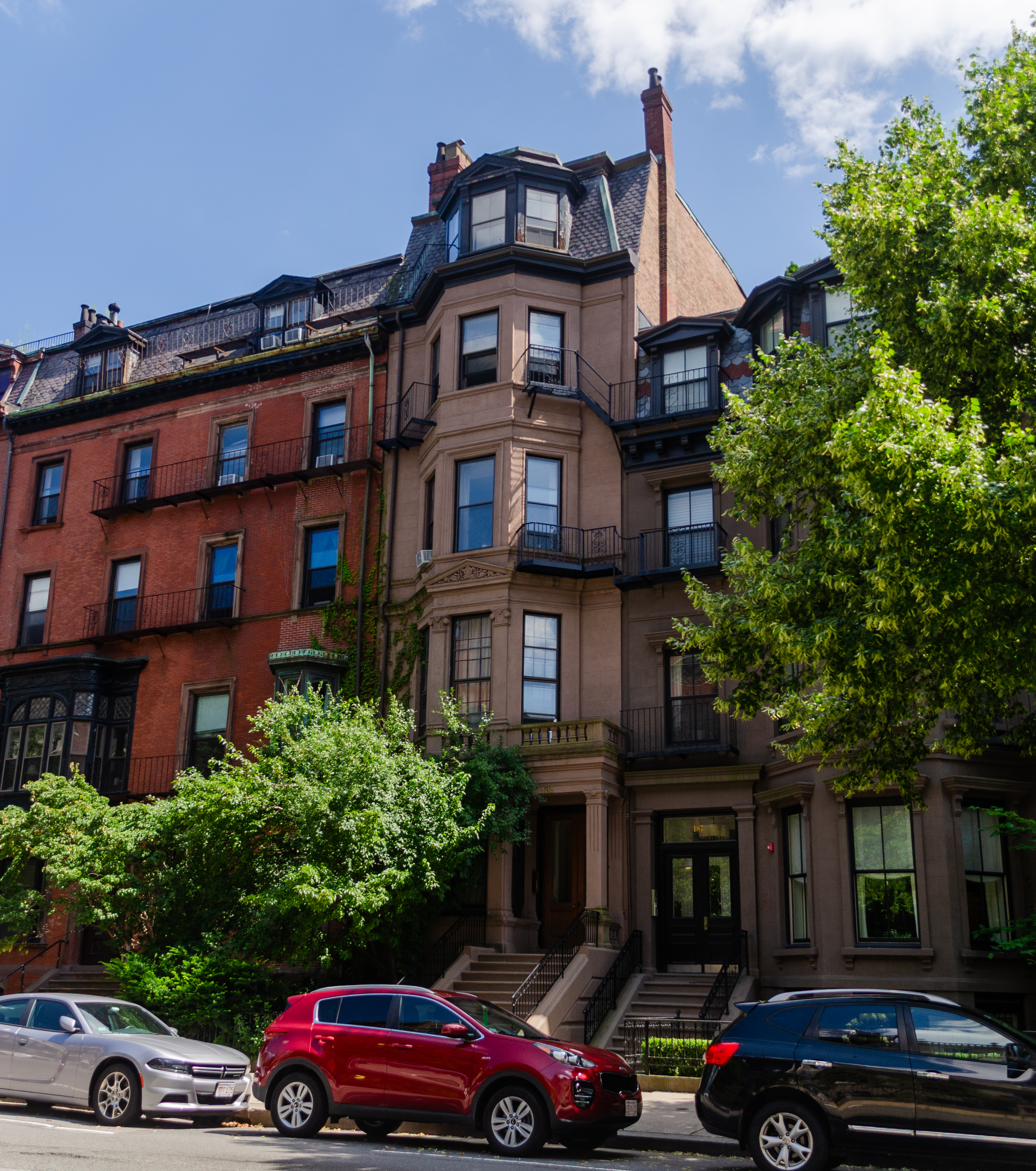
Anderson's Back Bay residence, designed by Peabody & Stearns

John Francis Anderson (December 4, 1832 – April 19, 1902) was an officer in the Union Army during the American Civil War.

== Military career ==
When the war broke out, Anderson who was the son of Maine's former Governor Hugh J. Anderson was initially commissioned First Lieutenant in the militia; and on September 2, 1861, Anderson became the adjutant of the 24th Regiment Massachusetts Volunteer Infantry. He was appointed to Maj. Gen. John G. Foster's staff as a major and an aide-de-camp on June 9, 1863 and served with that officer for most of the remainder of the war, resigning on March 27, 1865. On December 11, 1866, President Andrew Johnson nominated Major Anderson to the honorary grade of brevet brigadier general, to rank from March 13, 1865 and the United States Senate confirmed the award on February 6, 1867.

== See also ==
- List of Massachusetts generals in the American Civil War
- Massachusetts in the American Civil War
