= Henry Martyn Tremlett =

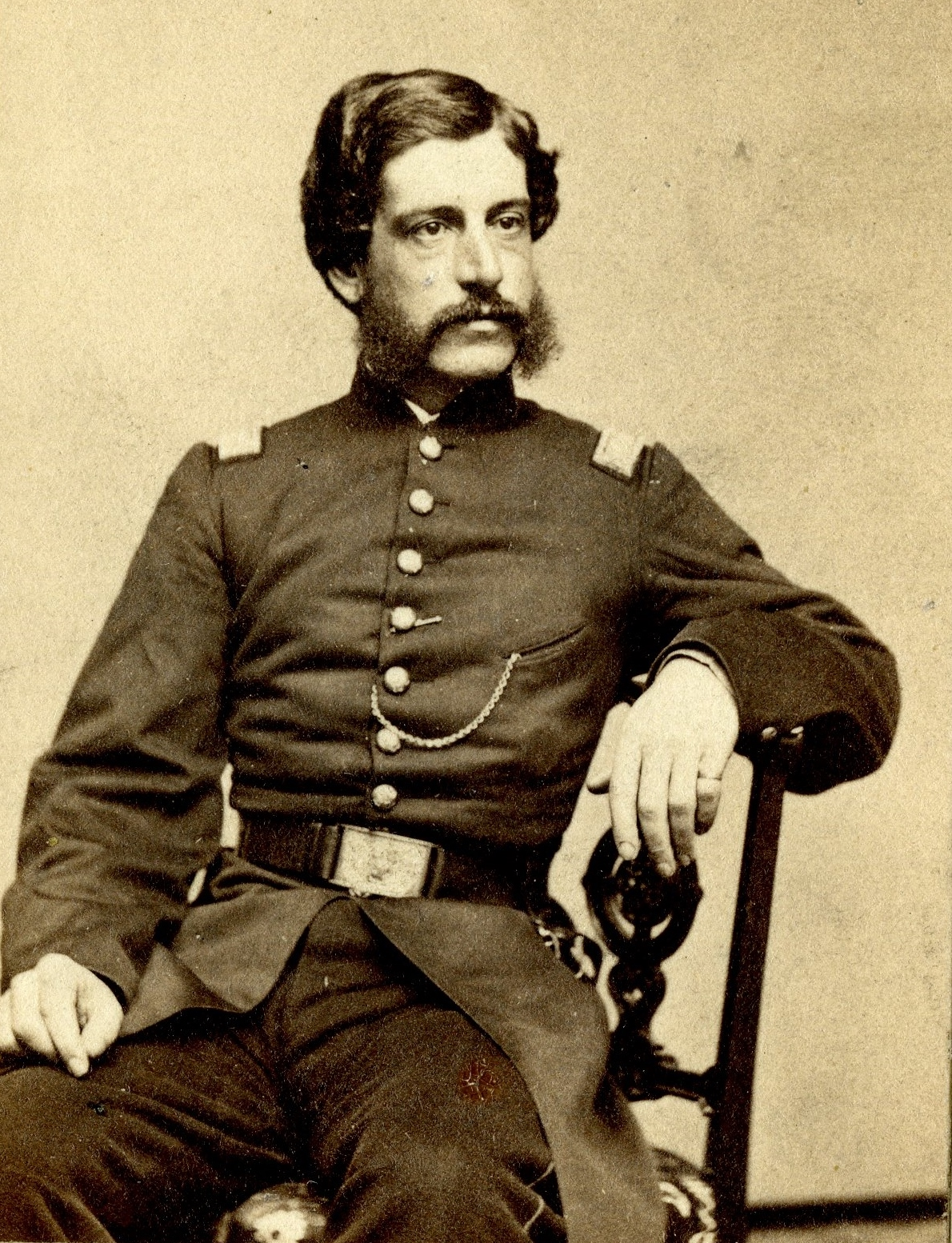

Personal details
- Born: January 1, 1833 Boston, Massachusetts, US
- Died: June 6, 1865 (aged 32) Boston, Massachusetts, US

Military service
- Allegiance: United States
- Branch/service: United States Army
- Years of service: 1861–1865
- Rank: Brevet Colonel
- Unit: 20th Massachusetts Volunteer Infantry
- Battles/wars: American Civil War

Henry Martyn Tremlett (January 1, 1833 – March 31, 1865) was a Boston merchant prior to serving four years' active duty during the American Civil War. Tremlett began as a captain in the 20th Massachusetts Volunteer Infantry Regiment from 1861 to 1862, then as a major in 1862, and eventually a lieutenant-colonel in 1864 commanding the 39th Massachusetts Volunteer Infantry Regiment.

== Early life ==
Tremlett was born in Dorchester, Massachusetts in 1833, the son of Thomas Tremlett, a successful shipping merchant doing business as Deblois & Tremlett on the waterfront at 28 Foster's Wharf in Boston, and Cordelia Dixon. In 1846 he was still living in Dorchester but was also listed as a student at Chauncey Hall School in Boston. Three years later, Tremlett's residence was listed as the same. By then one may assume he was at least an upperclassman if not a senior. Tremlett loved to travel, and after graduation from Chauncey Hall, he indulged that passion, including trips to exotic places like Chagres, Panama in 1850 and Calcutta, India in 1851. Especially for affluent young students, it was customary in the nineteenth century for them to travel after graduation, often quite extensively, to augment their education with the experience gained from touring the world.

From 1851 to 1854, Tremlett's whereabouts become a little difficult to track. It may be assumed that after graduating from Chauncey Hall, he may have applied to university, and if so, his first choice would likely have been Harvard. However, there is no record in the index of graduates in Harvard's Quinquennial Catalog of Officers and Graduates, 1636–1930 of anyone with a surname of Tremlett as having ever graduated there. Perhaps he attended Harvard but didn't graduate or otherwise furthered his formal education elsewhere. Perhaps for unknown reasons, Tremlett found university not to his liking, as there is no evidence that he was awarded a degree anywhere else either. Perhaps he decided to postpone university, putting it off in favor of his love of travel.

Tremlett was apparently more interested in pursuing a mercantile life, for in 1855, at age twenty-two, he settled down long enough to indeed enter into business in Boston with his older brother Frank (Francis E.) as Tremlett Bros. & Company, which at first was separate from their father's firm. In the U.S. Census of 1855, Henry is listed as being employed at Tremlett Bros. & Company as a clerk.

It would appear that between 1855 and 1857, with their father's health declining, Tremlett Bros. merged with Deblois & Tremlett, and at some point ownership officially transitioned to Frank and Henry. The Boston Atlas newspaper announced a partnership on March 2, 1857, between the brothers and a third party, one Fred H. Odiorne.

On September 8, 1858, Tremlett's father, Thomas, now in very poor health, returned on a voyage from England accompanied by his wife Cordelia, and their daughter Cordelia Rayner aboard the Charmer. The Charmer was captained by Isaac Shaw Lucas, who was married to Tremlett's sister Mary. Thomas Tremlett died less than a week later on September 13, 1858, at the age of sixty-one.

In 1859, Tremlett Bros. & Company was a successful going concern, with offices at 222 State Street and a bustling harbor location at 146 Broad Street on Foster's Wharf. Tremlett was back living with his family at 245 Shawmut Avenue, clearly in the prime of his life with a bright future, but a monstrous squall was forming on the horizon.

A photo of Tremlett taken in Boston by Silsbee, Case & Company portrays a man not large, but fit and trim at the waist, with dark eyes and hair and a thick handlebar moustache connecting to his sideburns. Seated in his captain's uniform, he conveys an air of dignity if not swagger, and an exposed watch chain runs to his watch, tucked into a slit pocket on the left breast.

== Civil War ==
The attack on Fort Sumter occurred on April 12, 1861.

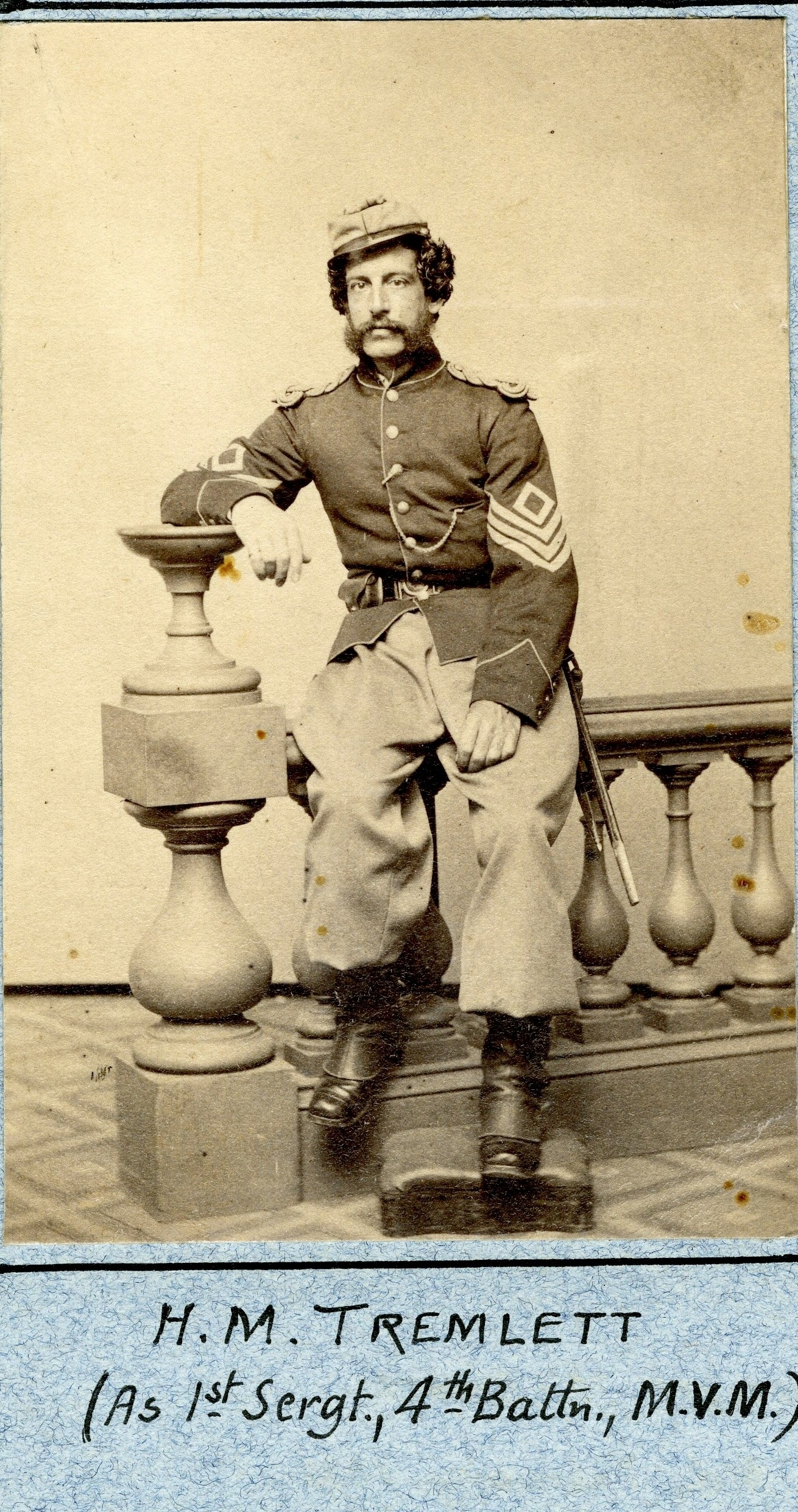
First Sergeant Henry Martin Tremlett, 4th Battalion, Massachusetts Militia, 1861

On April 25, Henry joined the Massachusetts Militia, fourth battalion, at Fort Warren located on Georges Island at the entrance to Boston Harbor. There he rose to the rank of sergeant in a short time.

On June 28, 1861, Massachusetts governor John A. Andrew appointed Colonel William Raymond Lee to command the Twentieth Regiment of Massachusetts Volunteer Infantry Regiment. Lee, a civil engineer in private life, was a classmate of Jefferson Davis at West Point and a veteran of the Florida Indian wars against the Seminoles. There is apparently no genealogical link between Colonel Lee and Robert E. Lee.

=== The Twentieth Massachusetts Volunteer Infantry Regiment ===
On July 10, 1861, less than three months after his time began at Fort Warren, Tremlett enlisted in the Twentieth Massachusetts Regiment which was forming up at Readville, south of Boston. The camp at Readville was named Camp Massasoit after the great Wampanoag Grand Sachem, but the regiment was often referred to as "The Harvard Regiment" because many of its officers were educated at Harvard University. The Twentieth Massachusetts was organized into ten companies. Tremlett was commissioned to the rank of captain and assigned to command Company A. The regiment was initially part of Lander's Brigade, Second Division, Second Corps.

On September 4, 1861, two months after First Manassas, the Twentieth Massachusetts received orders to leave for the front. They left Boston without any fanfare; they simply and quietly boarded trains for Washington. As one member of the regiment recalled, "We did not go into Boston and have a parade on the common as so many of the regiments did on their way to the field. In fact the twentieth never appeared in Boston as a regiment, neither when it first left for the war, nor at the close of the war."

After stops in New York, Philadelphia, and Baltimore they reached their final destination, Washington, on September 7. On September 12, the regiment was given orders to march to Poolesville, Maryland. Poolesville was located on the east bank of the Potomac River, thirty-five miles north of Washington. Virginia and the Confederacy were located on the west bank.

At Poolesville, the Twentieth was joined by at least two other Massachusetts infantry regiments, the Fifteenth and the Nineteenth, as well as Vaughn's Rhode Island Artillery Battery and others in the order of battle, all under the command of Brigadier General Charles Pomeroy Stone and ultimately General of the Army of the Potomac George McClellan. The army would remain at Poolesville a full month, assigned to picket duty along the Potomac River, consumed by daily drills, shooting practice, and strict discipline, including no noise after taps.

==== Ball's Bluff ====
The first engagement in which Henry and the Twentieth Massachusetts tasted combat was the Union debacle known as the Battle of Ball's Bluff outside Leesburg, Virginia. Misinformation and poor generalship resulted in a horrible defeat.

Ball's Bluff was not a large battle but it was another early Confederate victory and another ugly Union defeat at a time when Washington was growing more and more impatient over the lack of military success. Comparative battle strength between South and North was even . . . about 1,700 Union troops clashed with the same number of Confederate soldiers, but the Confederates earned a decisive victory. Union casualties numbered over 1,000, including 223 killed, 226 wounded, and an astounding number, 550, were captured or missing."

Despite the loss, late in the battle Tremlett was able to distinguish himself by organizing an escape with approximately 100 men by moving upriver under cover of darkness, acquiring a small boat, and transferring the men to the safety of the eastern bank of the Potomac river. Regimental surgeon Dr. Nathan Hayward recorded, "All our officers of the 20th behaved bravely without one exception. Some showed more than personal bravery—endurance, caution and a power of command. Captain Tremlett rescued his whole remaining company." After Ball's Bluff Henry was sent back to Boston to recruit replacements for his tattered regiment.

==== Peninsula Campaign ====
Tremlett's next action was the Peninsula Campaign. From April through July, 1862, he was part of an enormous force of approximately 121,000 troops that General George McClellan landed at Fort Monroe on the Virginia peninsula. McClellan's plan was to seize Richmond and thereby end the war, but instead he was turned back by General Robert E. Lee and eventually McClellan's entire army was driven from the peninsula. Tremlett's regiment fought at Eltham's Landing, Seven Pines, Oak Grove, Mechanicsville, Gaines' Mill, Savage's Station, Glendale, and Malvern Hill.

=== The Thirty-Ninth Massachusetts Volunteer Infantry Regiment ===
After the conclusion of the campaign, despite another defeat for the Union, he was promoted to the rank of major and reassigned to Company S of the Thirty-Ninth Massachusetts Volunteer Infantry Regimentunder Colonel P. Stearns Davis. The Thirty-Ninth was in the process of being formed up back in Lynnfield, Massachusetts, and in need of experienced combat officers as well as recruits so that the regiment could be brought up to fighting strength. Tremlett was assigned once again to draft rendezvous duty in Boston.

On September 6, 1862, the Thirty-Ninth broke camp and boarded trains bound for Washington. After some time in the capital, the regiment was charged with its primary responsibility of defending it, as some were concerned that Lee's army might attempt an incursion into Maryland, and if successful, move on Washington. The Thirty-Ninth was therefore ordered to march up the Potomac River into Maryland and establish camp at Poolesville, the same location from which the Twentieth Massachusetts had launched its ill-fated attack at Ball's Bluff the previous autumn. Henry probably found it sadly familiar. The rest of 1862 was uneventful if not boring for the Thirty-Ninth, consumed by picket duty, policing, and drills. The regiment remained in winter camp at Poolesville until April 1863, enduring a harsh winter consisting of protracted inclement weather, a good deal of it being snow. Though the frequent storms and cold temperatures were a hardship for the soldiers, not much in the way of fighting occurred, which was typical for both armies as winter was usually a time to regroup, reform, reinforce and stay warm and fed. On April 11, 1863, the Thirty-Ninth Regiment was ordered to return to Washington to once again more closely guard the capital. From that time through the end of 1863, Henry was assigned again to draft rendezvous duty back in Boston as provost marshal in charge of recruitment.

==== Petersburg ====
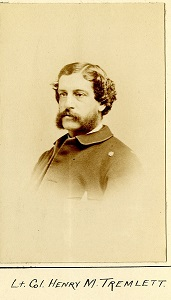
Lt. Col. Henry Martyn Tremlett, 39th Mass. Regiment, 1864

On July 10, 1864, Tremlett's three-year enlistment expired and he reenlisted. Still in Boston, he was promoted to the rank of lieutenant colonel three days later due to the death of the Thirty-Ninth's commanding officer, Colonel Phineas Stearns Davis, and the severe wounding of Colonel Charles L. Peirson on July 11. Peirson had served with Tremlett in the Twentieth Massachusetts and had been captured at Ball's Bluff.

Tremlett was promoted to colonel on January 5, 1865 and assigned as the new commanding officer of the Thirty-Ninth Regiment, Fifth Corps, which was camped in the center of the Union line outside Petersburg.

On February 5, 1865, the Thirty-Ninth and the rest of the Fifth Corps were ordered to march west to Dinwiddie Courthouse and on the next day, to Hatcher's Run, located at the extreme left flank of the Union line. Here they established camp and remained, skirmishing sporadically for most of the rest of the month of March.

On March 29, 1865, Tremlett's regiment was marched alone further to the left and approached the Boydton Plank Road, an important Confederate transportation and communication hub. General Lee had moved General George Pickett's division to the far right of the Confederate line to face the Fifth Corps. Tremlett's regiment met the enemy and made some modest gains amid frequent skirmishing.

On March 31, 1865, the Thirty-Ninth was ordered yet further left toward Gravelly Run where they encountered strong Confederate opposition. The Battle of Gravelly Run was also known as the Battle of White Oak Road, the Battle of Boydton Plank Road, and the Battle of Hatcher's Run. The Thirty-Ninth was in the forefront of the attack, having been assigned that position until the rest of Fifth Corps could be formed up, but, after initially suffering heavy casualties, the regiment fell back. Sometime early during the battle a minié ball struck Tremlett in the leg. As Adjutant General Schouler noted in his annual report, "Lieutenant-Colonel Tremlett was wounded soon after the engagement began, and was with much difficulty conveyed to the rear. It was found necessary at the hospital to amputate his leg at once." Up until that day Tremlett had survived four years' service in the Union army. There were only ten days left until Appomattox.

== Death and legacy ==
Back in Boston, Henry was hospitalized and received treatment over the course of several weeks before being discharged. He was considered to be recovering, and as a result he was returned to his home now on Beacon Hill. Not long after, he developed complications from his wound, not uncommon of this era, since without the benefit of antibiotics, the danger of sepsis after amputation was extreme. Two out of three deaths that occurred as a result of the war were attributable to disease, though most such deaths may have occurred as the result of wounds requiring amputation.

Henry died about a month after the armistice, on June 6, 1865.

The Thirty-Ninth Massachusetts Volunteer Infantry Regiment returned to Boston on the very same day. Henry's obituary in the Boston Post read:

Death of Lieut. Colonel Tremlett.—Lieutenant Colonel Henry M. Tremlett, of the Thirty-ninth Massachusetts regiment, died in this city yesterday afternoon, from the effects of a wound received several weeks since in the campaign before Richmond. The wound was such that he was compelled to suffer the amputation of a leg, and though at first it seemed highly probable that he would recover, his enfeebled system was unable to endure the shock, and he died as above stated. Colonel Tremlett went to the war in 1861 as captain in the Twentieth regiment, from which he was promoted in August, 1862, as Major of the 39th regiment, and in July, 1864, received the commission of Lieutenant Colonel. Col. Tremlett was a brave and efficient officer and earned an excellent reputation in the field.

Alfred S. Roe, a member of the Thirty-Ninth Massachusetts, wrote in the roster section of his regimental history:

Henry M. Tremlett, from Major July 13, 1864; absent at the time on detached service in Boston Harbor he did not rejoin the Regiment until October following; wd. March 31, 65, at Gravelly Run, he died of wounds at his home in Boston, June 6 following, the very day of the return of the Thirty-ninth. The six weeks immediately following the battle were spent in the hospital at City Point; thence he returned to Boston, getting there May 9, apparently on the road to recovery, but the setting in of intermittent fever proved to be too great a trial of his strength; his body was buried in Forest Hills Cemetery. Of him a writer in a Boston paper wrote at the time: His standard of manliness was one of noble action rather than of puling pretension, and his whole life showed him to be a loving son, a dear brother, a kind and generous companion, a devoted friend and a truly loyal man, willing.

Henry also received a tribute from Adjutant General George Schouler:

“The arrival home was saddened to the regiment by the death, immediately after, of its colonel, Henry M. Tremlett. He died at his home in Boston, from the effects of the wound received at Petersburg; but the blow was a sudden one to the regiment, from the favorable accounts which had been received from him from time to time. After a term of service extending back to Ball's Bluff, it seemed hard to lose him at the very end. In his death, the regiment lost a good commander, who had made himself loved by both officers and men, and respected by all, for his distinguished courage.”

== Bibliography ==
- Bruce, Brevet Lieutenant-Colonel George A. The Twentieth Regiment of Massachusetts Volunteer Infantry. 1861–1865. Cambridge, MA: Riverside, 1906.
- Roe, Alfred S. The Thirty-Ninth Regiment Massachusetts Volunteers 1862–1865, Regimental Veteran Association, Worcester, Massachusetts, 1914; 336.
- Schouler, William, Adjutant General of the Commonwealth of Massachusetts. Annual Report of the Adjutant General of the Commonwealth of Massachusetts, for the Year Ending December 31, 1861, Boston: Wright & Potter, State Printers, 1862.
