= Paul Joseph Revere =

Brevet Brigadier General in the Union Army during the American Civil War

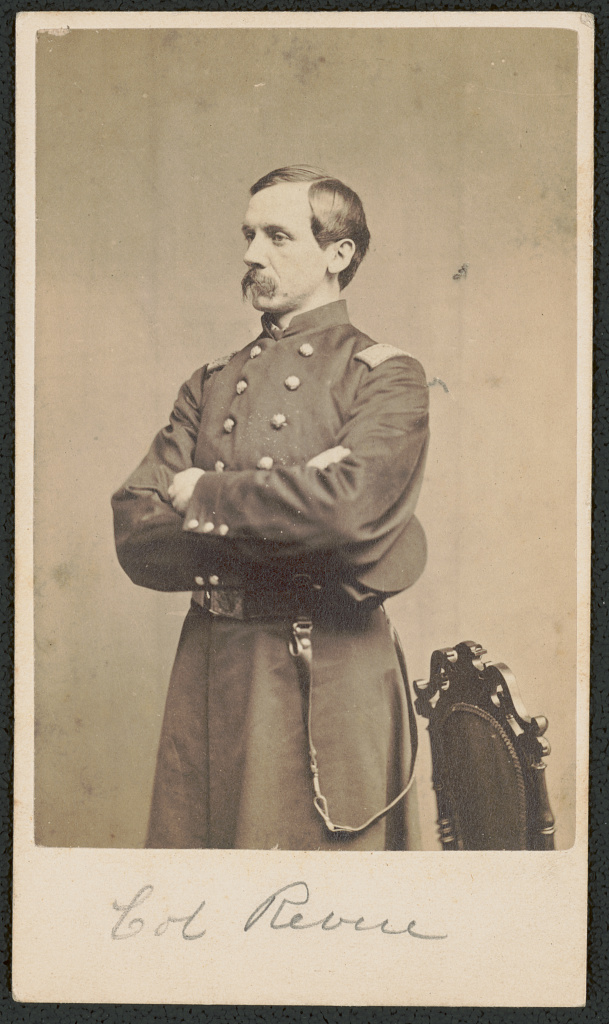
Revere in 1862. Liljenquist Family Collection, Library of Congress.

Paul Joseph Revere (September 10, 1832 – July 4, 1863) was a Brevet Brigadier General in the Union army during the American Civil War.

== Early life ==
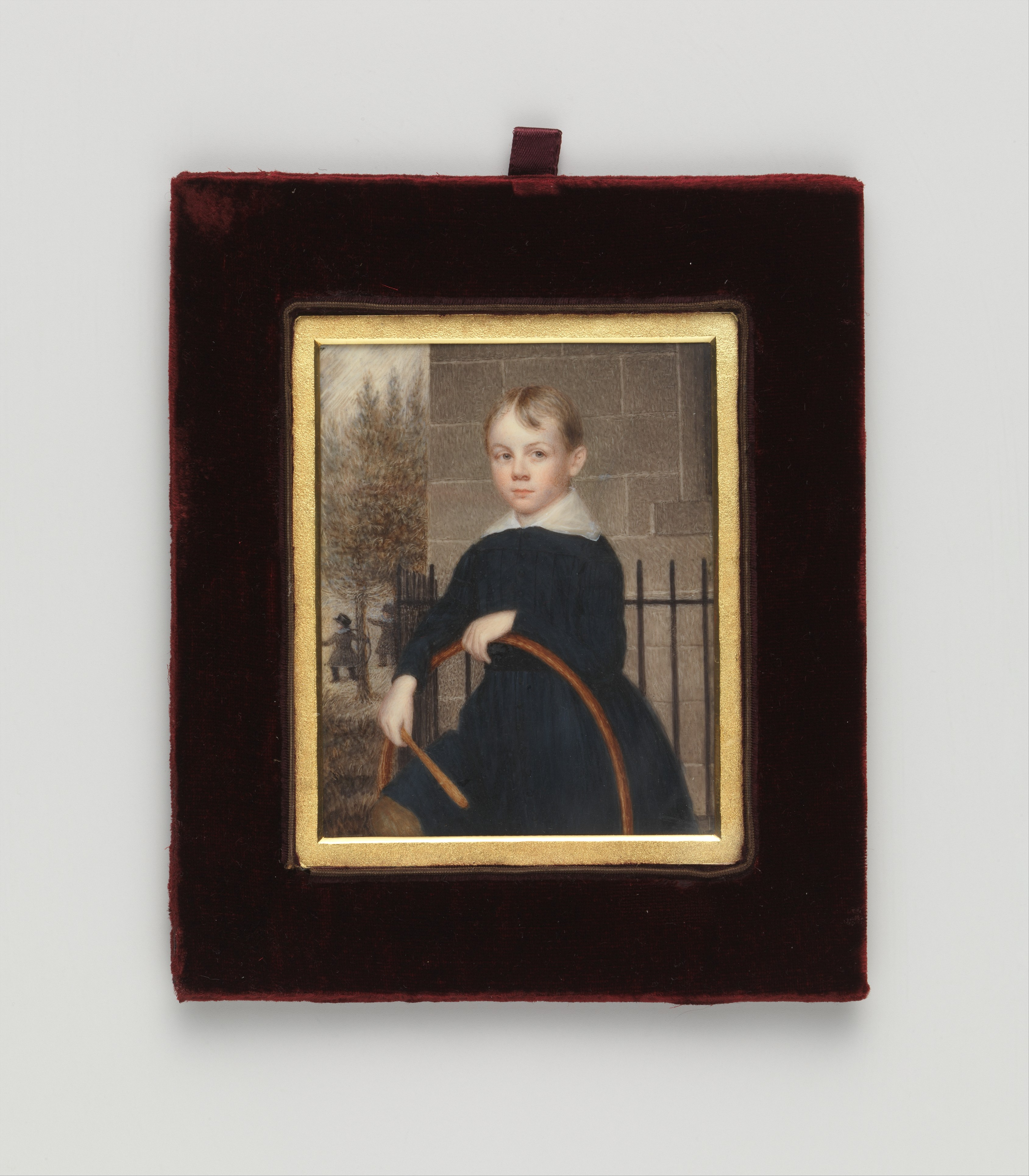
Portrait of Paul Joseph Revere by Margaret Maclay Bogardus.

Revere was born in Suffolk County, Massachusetts. He was one of the three grandsons and namesake of Revolutionary War patriot Paul Revere, who fought for the Union army, another being Joseph Warren Revere. He graduated from Harvard University in 1852.

== Career ==
In July 1861, he was commissioned a major in the 20th Massachusetts Infantry. In October 1861, at the Battle of Ball's Bluff in Virginia, Revere was wounded and captured by the Confederate States Army. He was paroled in February 1862 and officially exchanged in May 1862. In September 1862, Revere participated in the Battle of Antietam, in which he suffered a second wound and Edward Hutchinson Revere, another of Paul Revere's grandsons, was killed. On July 2, 1863, Revere, by now colonel of his regiment, was mortally wounded at the Battle of Gettysburg and died two days later.

== See also ==
- List of Massachusetts generals in the American Civil War
