= 27th Massachusetts Infantry Regiment =

27th Regiment Massachusetts Volunteer Infantry
- Active: September 20, 1861 – June 26, 1865
- Country: United States of America
- Allegiance: Union
- Branch: Infantry
- Size: 1,509

The 27th Massachusetts Volunteer Infantry was an infantry regiment recruited in Massachusetts for service in the American Civil War.

== History ==
The ten companies of the 27th Massachusetts Volunteers were recruited in the western part of the State in the late summer and fall of 1861. The original recruits were officially mustered in for 3 years at Springfield between Sept. 19 and 27. The original recruitment of each of the 10 companies were centered in the following communities: Company A (Northampton), Company B (Athol), Company C (large variety of Western Mass. towns), Company D (Amherst, Hadley), Company E (Great Barrington, Lee, Pittsfield), Company F (Westfield, Granville, Southwick, Tolland), Company G (Chicopee, Northampton, Holyoke), Company H (Adams, Williamstown), Company I (Ludlow, Wilbraham, Brimfield, Palmer) and Company K (Springfield).

Once fully outfitted, they were sent south to Annapolis, Maryland. in November and remained there undergoing instructions and drill for two months. In January, 1862, the regiment was shipped to North Carolina and assigned to Foster's (1st) Brigade. The regiment's first battles were fought at Roanoke Island and New Bern.

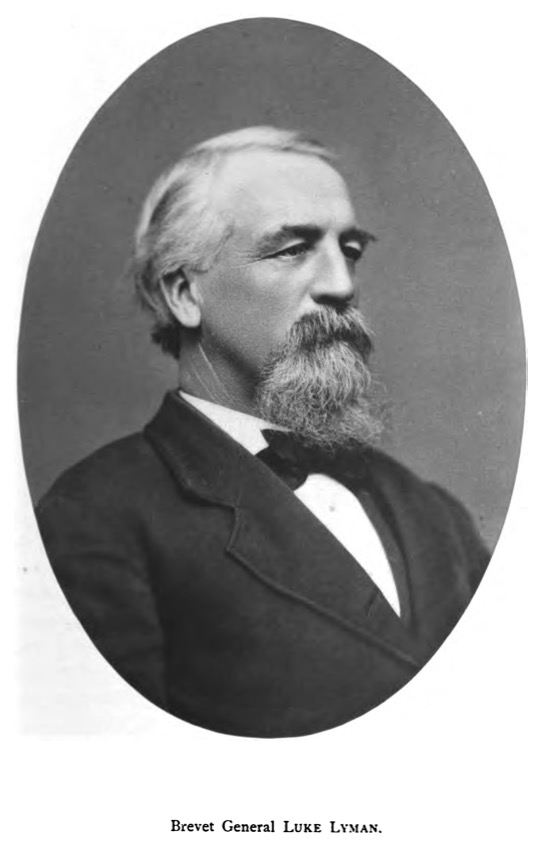
General Luke Lyman

The regiment remained in North Carolina during the next two years. Because Colonel Horace Clark Lee was in command of the brigade most of the time, the regiment was mostly under the direct command of Lieutenant Colonel Luke Lyman. During its stay in North Carolina it was engaged with credit in numerous minor battles and skirmishes. In April, 1863, it aided in the siege of Washington, North Carolina. After the return to New Bern an expedition to Gum swamp was undertaken and in an engagement there a number of prisoners were captured. New Bern was the regiment's headquarters until Oct. 10, 1863, when it was ordered to Newport News and was for a time occupied with routine duties at Norfolk and Portsmouth.

In April 1864, the 27th Massachusetts was assigned to the Army of the James. It embarked for Virginia, docking at Yorktown, thence to Williamsburg, Fortress Monroe and Bermuda Hundred, where it landed and marched to Cobb's hill. Soon afterward, the 27th was sent into action. The battles of Dunn's farm and Port Walthall Junction followed and during one day the regiment had 5 wounded, while 50 were disabled by sunstroke. At Arrowfield Church the 27th was engaged as well.

On May 16, the regiment was engaged at the Battle of Proctor's Creek (alternately Drewry's Bluff or Fort Darling). After a brave defense of their position, much of the regiment was surrounded while fighting in a dense fog, losing in addition to its killed and wounded, 252 of its number taken prisoners. Among the captured were the colonel, lieutenant colonel, and General Heckman; some 120 would later die in prison suffering appalling conditions at Andersonville.

On May 26, the regiment was transferred to the Army of the Potomac. Within a week, Major William A. Walker was killed leading the regiment in the bloody assault on Confederate positions at the Battle of Cold Harbor on June 3. In this battle, an additional 22 were killed, 68 wounded, and 4 missing.

The remnants of the regiment were ordered to Petersburg to join in on the assault this city. The heaviest losses sustained by the regiment on the assault on Petersburg occurred on June 18, 1864, when 11 were killed or mortally wounded, and 29 wounded. Altogether, the regiment sustained a total of 19 killed or mortally wounded, and 53 wounded during its service in and around Petersburg between June 14 and August 19.

The reenlisted men and recruits of the regiment were sent south to Beaufort, North Carolina, encamped at Carolina City, then moved to Beaufort, Plymouth and Jamestown, where the enemy's skirmishers were encountered. The Confederates disputed the possession of the bridge at Foster's mills, but after the 27th crossed, retreated and the regiment pushed forward and captured a Confederate force at Butler's bridge.

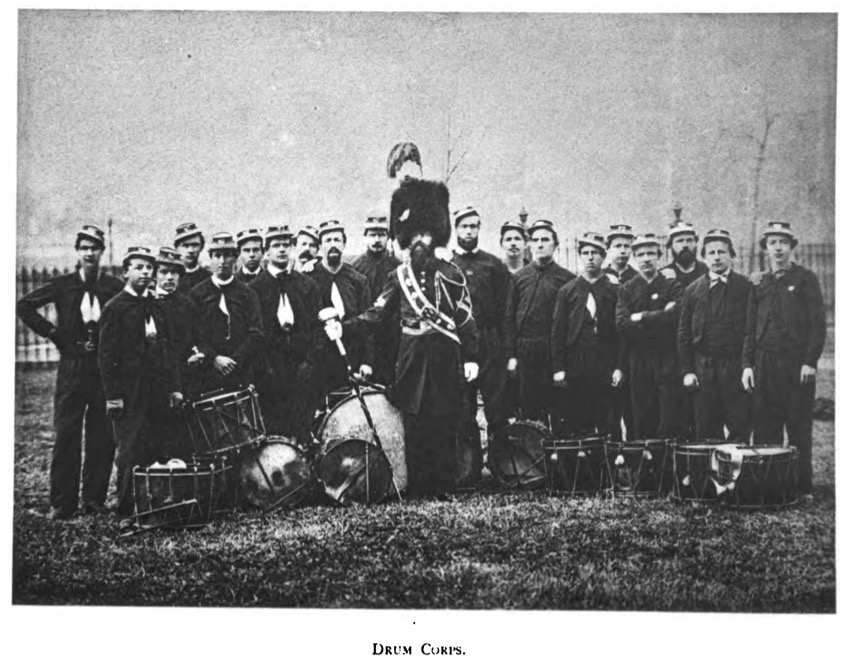
27th Massachusetts Drum Corps

It returned in January 1865 to New Bern. On March 8, it was attacked at Southwest Creek (Wise's Forks), where the whole brigade, with a few exceptions, was captured, after resisting for an hour in an engagement with Confederate General Hoke's entire division of 8,000 men. In its last engagement of the war, 11 men were killed or mortally wounded, 24 wounded, and a total of 170 captured. The national and state colors barely escaped capture. Color Sergeant John McCleary (national) and Color-Corporal William W. Cummings were both wounded and the colors taken over by Corporal Lafayette Babb and Private Leverett Clarke. When capture became certain, these two men wrapped the colors around the staffs, hid them under a rotten log, and covered it with leaves and grass. When the prisoners were exchanged in April they told other members of the regiment at New Bern where to find the flags and they were recovered. The captives were taken to Richmond, paroled and then furloughed. The few who escaped, reinforced by recruits and convalescents, were assigned to guard duty at New Bern until mustered out.

During the course of the Civil War, there were three regiments that were recruited from towns located in the four westernmost counties of Massachusetts (Berkshire, Franklin, Hampden, and Hampshire). These included the 10th, 27th, and 46th Volunteers. In the 27th Massachusetts, the towns that supplied at least 10 men to the regiment include:

Springfield (124) Northampton (86) Amherst (72) Chicopee (61) Adams (60) Athol (56) Westfield (54) Granville (35) Hadley (34) Ludlow (34) Great Barrington (31) Lee (29) Pittsfield (29) Wilbraham (28) Montague (24) Brimfield (20) Easthampton (20) New Salem (19) Williamsburg (19) Belchertown (19) Williamstown (18) Holyoke (18) Southwick (17) Greenfield (16) Leverett (16) Palmer (16) Worthington (16) Blandford (15) Tolland (14) Wendell (14) Deerfield (13) Ware (13) Charlemont (12) Erving (12) Granby (12) Northfield (12) Huntington (11) Shelburne (11) Shutesbury (11) Enfield, MA (10) Monterey (10) Pelham (10) South Hadley (10) Orange (10)

== Roll of Honor ==
The total number of men who served under the flag of the 27th Massachusetts was 1,543. Of this number, 329 did not survive the war. This total includes 121 killed or mortally wounded in battle, 132 who died in prison, 68 who died by disease, and 8 that died by accident.

In addition, 49 men were discharged for wounds, and another 265 for disability. An additional 56 men were transferred to the Veteran Reserve Corps. Three men were discharged by court martial. Five officers left the 27th Massachusetts to accept commissions as officers in U.S. Colored Troops.

== Flags ==
Between October 18, 1861, and June 15, 1864, eight flags were presented to the Massachusetts 27th Infantry Regiment. Of the eight flags, three were displayed in Hall of Flags in the Massachusetts State House during the 20th Century and are now preserved in environmentally controlled storage in the State House.

== See also ==
- List of Massachusetts Civil War units
- Massachusetts in the Civil War
