= 1st Massachusetts Cavalry Regiment =

Union military unit during US Civil War

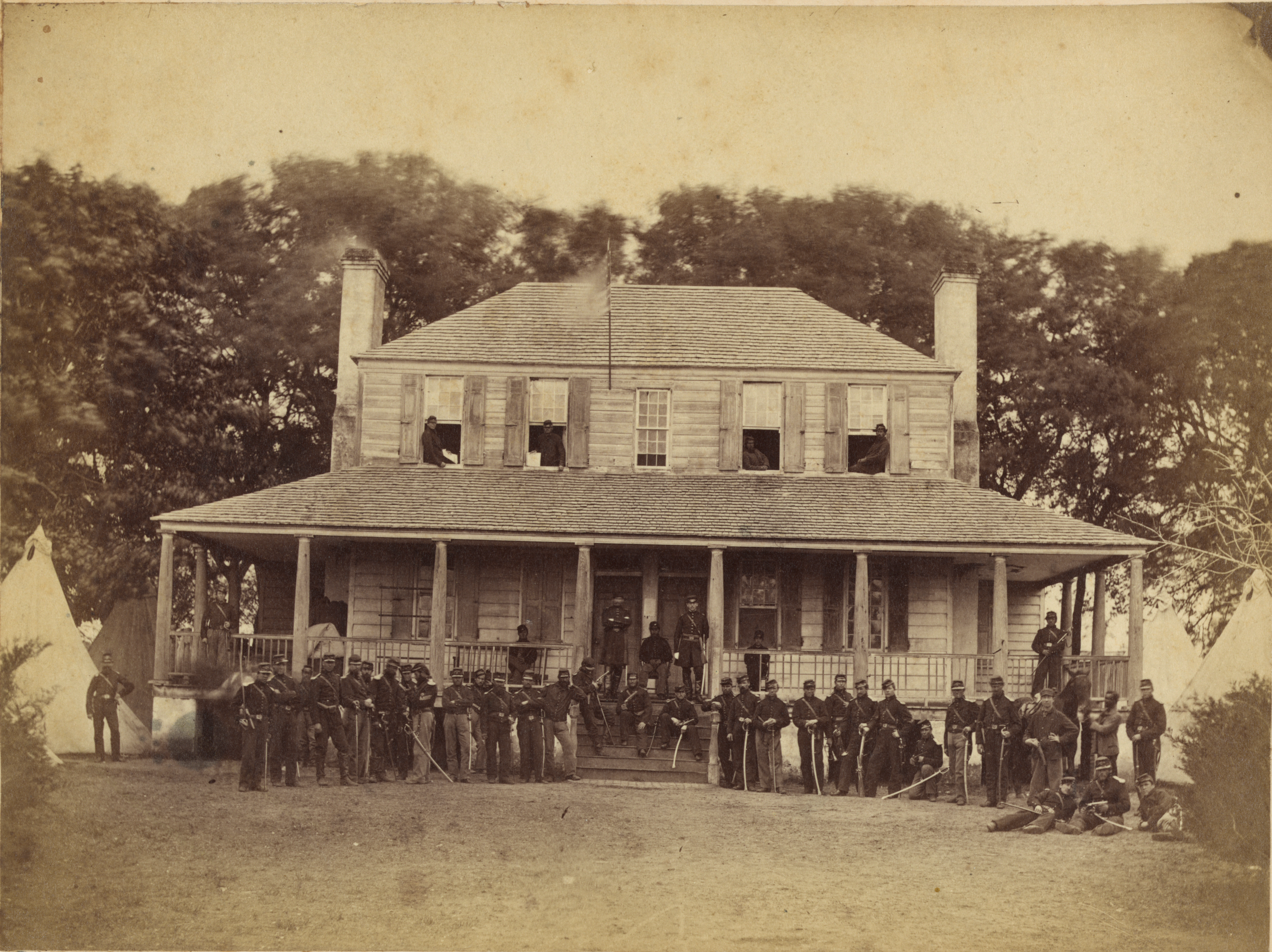
- Headquarters of 1st Mass Cavalry, on Edisto Island, 1862
- Active: September 3, 1861 to July 24, 1865
- Country: United States
- Allegiance: Union
- Branch: Cavalry
- Engagements: First Battle of Pocotaligo; Battle of Secessionville (Company H); Battle of Antietam; Battle of Fredericksburg; Battle of Aldie; Battle of Gettysburg; Bristoe Campaign; Mine Run Campaign; Battle of Cedar Creek (Companies B, C, & D); Battle of the Wilderness; Battle of Yellow Tavern; Battle of Spotsylvania Court House; Battle of Cold Harbor; Siege of Petersburg; First Battle of Deep Bottom; Battle of the Crater (Companies C & D); Battle of Vaughan Road

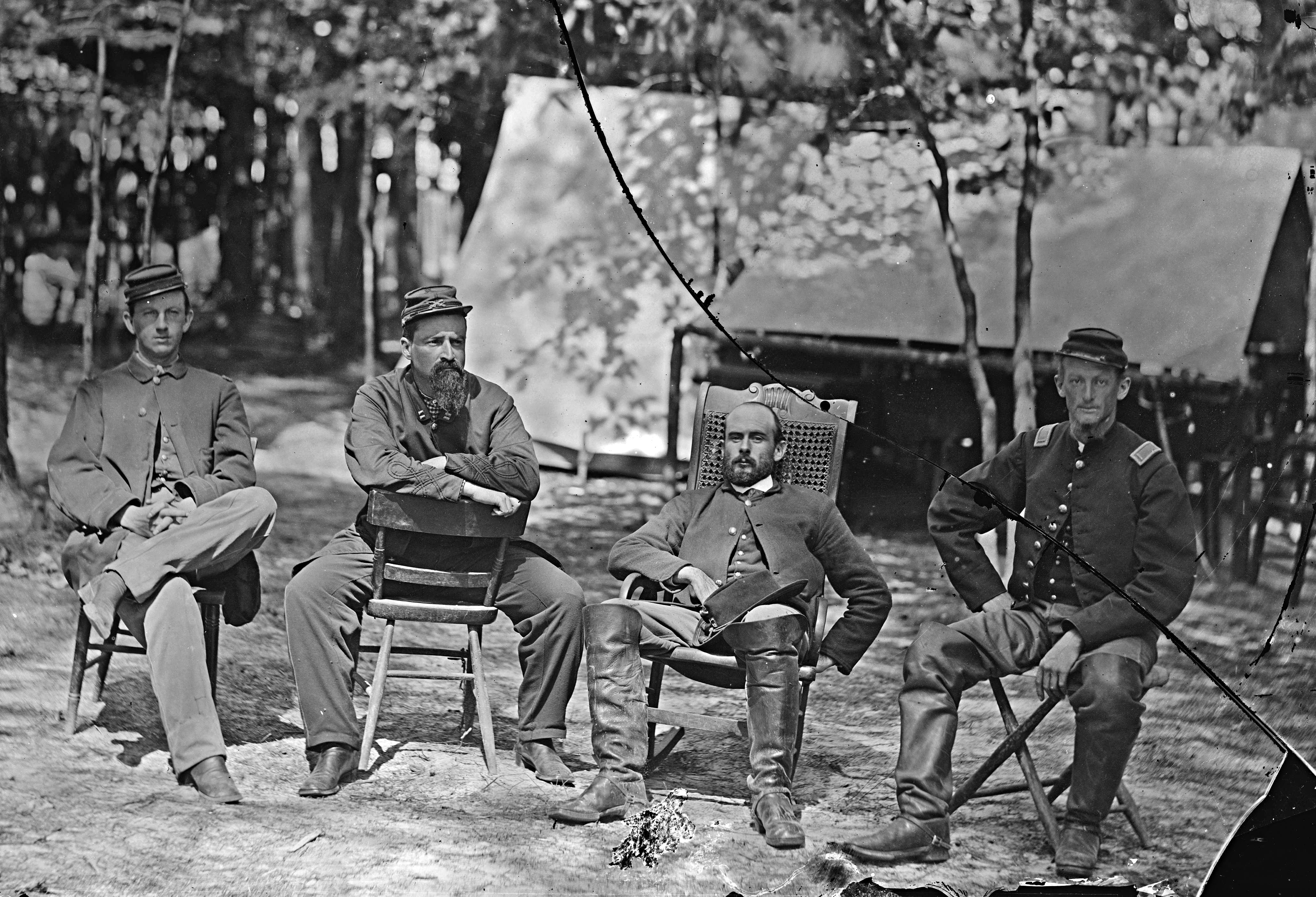
Captain Charles Francis Adams Jr. (second from right) with officers of the 1st Massachusetts Cavalry, August 1864

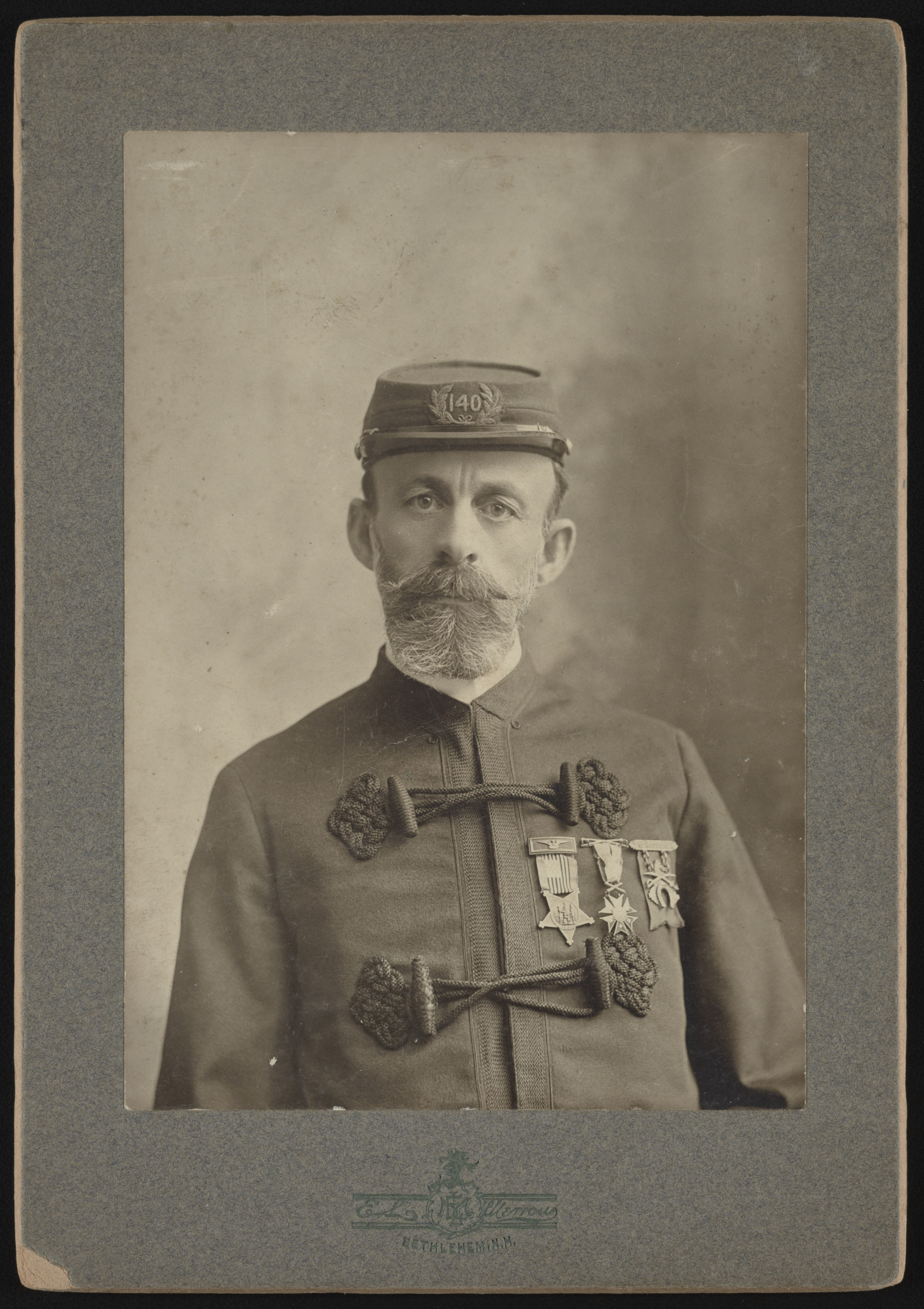
Civil War veteran Henry Thurlow Bartlett of Co. H, 1st Massachusetts Cavalry Regiment in uniform wearing medals, 1898. From the Liljenquist Family Collection of Civil War Photographs, Prints and Photographs Division, Library of Congress

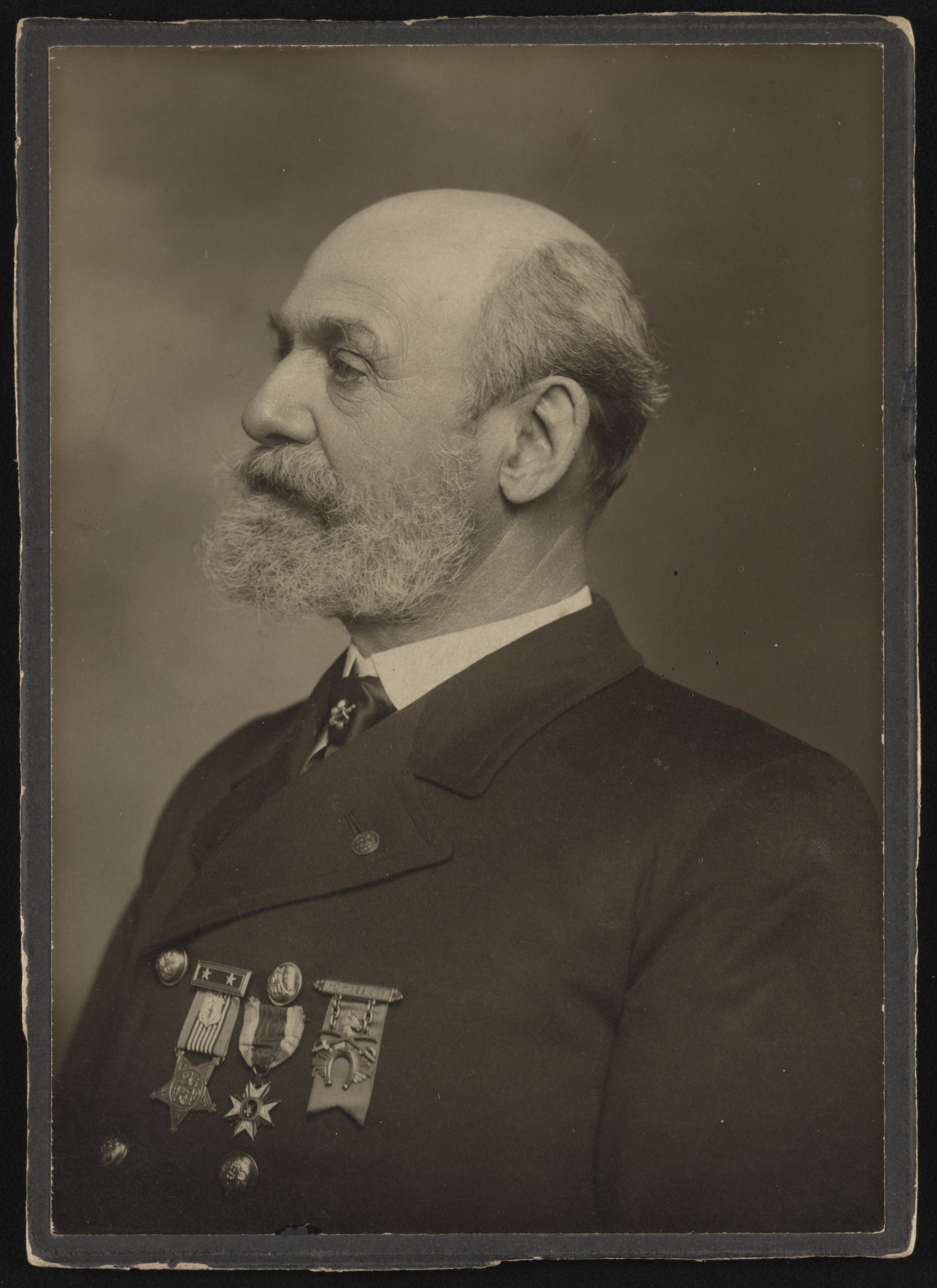
Captain Daniel Henry Lawrence Gleason of Co. G, 1st Massachusetts Cavalry Regiment

The 1st Massachusetts Volunteer Cavalry Regiment was a cavalry regiment that served in the Union Army during the American Civil War.

== Service ==
The 1st Massachusetts Cavalry was organized at Camp Brigham in Readville, Massachusetts beginning September 3, 1861 and mustered in under the command of Colonel Robert Williams.

The regiment was attached to the Department of the South to April 1862. 3rd Brigade, 1st Division, Department of the South, to August 1862. Companies A through H moved to Fort Monroe August 19, 1862, then moved to Washington, D.C., and joined Pleasanton's Cavalry, Army of the Potomac, at Tenallytown, September 3. Attached to Pleasanton's Cavalry, Army of the Potomac, to October 1862. Averill's Brigade, Cavalry Division, Army of the Potomac, to January 1863. 1st Brigade, 2nd Division, Cavalry Corps, Army of the Potomac, to April 1865. Four new companies (I, K, L, and M) were organized December 5. 1863 to January 14, 1864. Provost Marshal's Command, Army of the Potomac, to May 1865. Headquarters, Army of the Potomac, to June 1865.

The 1st Massachusetts Cavalry mustered out of service on June 29, 1865 and was discharged at Readville on July 24, 1865.

== Detailed service ==
=== 1861 ===
- Companies A, B, C, and D left Massachusetts for Annapolis, Maryland, December 25, 1861, then moved to Hilton Head, South Carolina, February 1862, and joined the regiment.
- Second Battalion left Massachusetts for New York December 27, and Third Battalion December 29 for the same point, then sailed for Hilton Head, S.C., January 13, arriving January 20, 1862. The men sailed on the steamships Baltic, Empire City, and Marion, and the horses sailed aboard Star of the South, and Catawba. Duty at Hilton Head, S.C., until May 1862.

=== 1862 ===
- Moved to Edisto Island, S.C., May (Companies E through M).
- Operations on James Island, S.C., June 1–28.
  - Action James Island June 8.
  - Battle of Secessionville June 16 (Company H).
- Evacuation of James Island and movement to Hilton Head June 28-July 7
- Antietam Campaign, September 4–20, Commanded by Captain Caspar Crowninshield, Colonel John F. Farnsworth's 2nd Brigade, Brigadier General Alfred Pleasonton's Second Division of Cavalry Division, Army of the Potomac
  - Poolesville, Maryland, September 4–5.
  - Sugar Loaf Mountain September 10–11.
  - South Mountain September 14.
  - Battle of Antietam September 16–17.
  - Shepherdstown, Virginia, September 19.
- Kearneysville, Shepherdstown, and Smithfield October 16–17.
- Four companies with V Corps October 30-November 25.
- Four companies near Hagerstown, Md., until November 16, then moved to Washington November 16–25, and duty there refitting until December 13, Bloomfield November 2–3.
- Snicker's Gap November 3–4.
- Markham Station November 4.
- Manassas Gap November 5–6.
- Reconnaissance to Grove Church December 1.
- Battle of Fredericksburg, Va., December 12–15, commanded by Colonel Horace B. Sargent, Brigadier General William W. Averell's Cavalry Brigade of Major General Daniel Butterfield's V Corps, Army of the Potomac
- Reconnaissance toward Warrenton December 21–22.
- Expedition to Richard's and Ellis' Fords December 29–30.

=== 1863 ===
- Reconnaissance to Catlett's and Rappahannock Station January 8–10, 1863.
- Elk Run, Catlett's Station, January 9.
- Near Grove Church January 9.
- Destruction of Rappahannock Bridge February 5.
- Hartwood Church February 25.
- Kelly's Ford March 17.
- Bealeton March 17.
- Chancellorsville Campaign, Stoneman's Raid, April 29-May 6. Commanded by Lieutenant Colonel Greely S. Curtis, Colonel Horace B Sargent's 1st Brigade, Brigadier General William W. Averell's 2nd Division, Brigadier General George Stoneman's Cavalry Corps, Army of the Potomac
- Near Fayetteville June 3.
- Kelly's Ford, Brandy Station, and Stevensburg June 9.
- Battle of Aldie (June 15–18).
- Upperville June 21.
- Battle of Gettysburg July 2–3. Commanded by Colonel Horace B. Sargent, Colonel John B. McIntosh's 1st Brigade of Brigadier General David McMurtrie Gregg's Second Division of Major General Alfred Pleasonton's Cavalry Corps, Army of the Potomac
- Emmetsburg July 4.
- Williamsport July 6–7.
- Near Harpers Ferry, W. Va., July 14.
- Old Antietam Forge, near Leitersburg, July 10.
- Jones' Cross Roads July 12.
- Shepherdstown July 16.
- Near Aldie July 31.
- Scout to Hazel River August 4.
- Rixeyville August 5.
- Welford's Ford August 9.
- Scout to Barbee's Cross Roads August 24.
- Scout to Middleburg September 10–11.
- Advance from the Rappahannock to the Rapidan September 13–17.
  - Culpeper Court House September 13.
  - Rapidan Station September 13–15.
- Bristoe Campaign October 9–22.
  - Warrenton (or White Sulphur Springs) October 12.
  - Auburn and Bristoe October 14.
  - Brentsville October 14.
- Picket near Warrenton until November 22.
- Mine Run Campaign November 26-December 2.
  - New Hope Church November 27

=== 1864 ===
- Scout and picket duty at Warrenton until April 21, 1864.
- Kilpatrick's Raid on Richmond February 28-March 4.

-Providing some background with official dates from battalions expeditions Second Battalion, Massachusetts Cavalry Regiment (Companies A, B, C, and D)

Embarked from Boston, Massachusetts, aboard the steamer Western Metropolis on March 20, 1864, bound for Hilton Head, South Carolina, where the battalion arrived on April 1. From April to June, the companies performed picket and outpost duty in the vicinity of Hilton Head.Two companies took part in an expedition to the Ashepoo River from May 22 to 26. In early June (June 6–8), two companies were ordered to Jacksonville, Florida, where they remained in active service until January 1865. While stationed there, the detachment was engaged in several notable actions, including a skirmish at Front Creek on July 15, and a mounted raid on Baldwin from July 23 to 28. Engagements occurred at South Fork, Black Creek (July 24), St. Mary’s Trestle (July 26), and during a raid on the Florida Railroad (August 15–19), including action at Gainesville on August 17. Further operations included skirmishes at Magnolia and Gum Swamp on October 24. Meanwhile, the remaining two companies stayed on duty at Hilton Head from June through November 1864. They participated in the expedition to John’s Island (July 2–10), including operations against Confederate Battery Pringle (July 4–9). In late November, the battalion took part in the expedition to Boyd’s Neck (November 29–30) and was heavily engaged in the Battle of Honey Hill on November 30. This was followed by the expedition to Deveaux’s Neck (December 1–6). In early 1865, the battalion joined the Union advance on Charleston, marching from January 15 to February 23. Later operations included Potter’s Expedition through South Carolina (April 5–25), with engagements at Statesburg (April 15), the occupation of South Mills (April 17), Boykin’s Mills (April 18), Denkin’s Mills, and Beech Creek near Statesburg (April 19). The battalion remained on duty in the Department of the South until it was mustered out of service.

- Fortifications of Richmond March 1. (Companies C and D assigned to Headquarters of the Army of the Potomac, April 1864 to muster out.)
- Overland Campaign May–June. Commanded by Lieutenant Colonel Samuel E. Chamberlain, Brigadier General Henry E. Davies, Jr.'s 1st Brigade, Brigadier General David M. Gregg's 2nd Division of MG Philip H. Sheridan's Cavalry Corps, Army of the Potomac
  - Todd's Tavern May 5–6.
  - Wilderness May 6–7.
  - Battle of Todd's Tavern May 7–8.
  - Corbin's Bridge, Spotsylvania, May 8.
  - Davenport Ford May 9.
  - Sheridan's Raid to James River May 9–24.
  - North Anna River May 9–10.
  - Ground Squirrel Church, Ashland, and Battle of Yellow Tavern May 11.
  - Brooks' Church, or Richmond Fortifications, May 12.
  - Line of the Pamunkey May 26–28.
  - Totopotomoy May 28–31.
  - Cold Harbor May 31-June 1.
  - About Cold Harbor June 1–7.
  - Sumner's Upper Bridge June 2.
  - Sheridan's Trevillian Raid June 7–24.
    - Trevilian Station June 11–12.
    - Newark, or Mallory's Cross Roads, June 12.
    - Black Creek, or Tunstall Station, and White House, or St. Peter's Church, June 21.
  - St. Mary's Church June 24.
- Camp at Prince George Court House June 27-July 13.
- Weldon Railroad and Warwick Swamp July 12. At Lee's Mills until July 26.
- Demonstration on north side of James River July 27–29.
- First Battle of Deep Bottom July 27–29.
- Malvern Hill July 28.
- Lee's Mills July 30.
- Scouting duty until August 14.
- Demonstration north of the James River August 14–18.
- Gravel Hill August 14.
- Strawberry Plains August 14–18.
- Battle of Globe Tavern (August 18–21). Commanded by Chamberlain, Colonel William Stedman's 1st Brigade, Gregg's 2nd Division, Cavalry Corps, Army of the Potomac
  - Charles City Cross Roads August 18.
  - Weldon Railroad August 19–21.
- Dinwiddie Road, near Ream's Station, August 23.
- Ream's Station August 25.
- Hawkinsville September 14.
- Jerusalem Plank Road September 16.
- Belcher's Mills September 17.
- Poplar Grove Church September 29-October 2.
- Davis' Farm September 30.
- Arthur's Swamp September 30-October 1.
- Vaughan Road October 1. (Veterans left the front for Massachusetts October 25, 1864.)
- Battle of Boydton Plank Road (October 27–28, 1864), Hatcher's Run, Commanded by Chamberlain, Brigadier GeneralHenry E. Davies's 1st Brigade, Gregg's 2nd Division, Cavalry Corps, Army of the Potomac
- At McCann's Station until November 18.
- Reconnaissance toward Stony Creek November 7.
- At Westbrook House until December 1.
- Stony Creek Station December 1.
- Bellefield Raid December 7–12.
- Bellefield December 9–10.

=== 1865 ===
- At Westbrook House until March 17, 1865.
- Dabney's Mills, Hatcher's Run, February 5–7.
- Provost duty at City Point until April 2.
- Appomattox campaign, March 29 – April 9
  - Company C commanded by Capt Edward A. Flint and Company D commanded by Captain Jamesserving in Provost Guard, Headquarters, Army of the Potomac
  - Eight companies commanded by Maj John Tewksbury in Brevet Brigadier General Charles H. T. Collis's Independent Brigade, Headquarters, Army of the Potomac
- Provost duty until May 27.
- Duty in the defenses of Washington until June 26.

=== Detached Duty ===
Third Battalion (Companies I, K, L, and M)

- Served duty in District of Beaufort, S.C., until August, 1862 Action at Pocotaligo, South Carolina, May 22, 1862 (detachment).
- Patrol and guard duty and picketing Broad River.
- Expedition to St. John's Bluff, Fla., September 30-October 13, 1862.
- Expedition to Pocotaligo, S.C., October 21–23.
- Pocotaligo Bridge October 21.
- Caston and Frampton's Plantation October 22.
- Attached to X Corps, Department of the South.
- Company M at Hilton Head, S.C., and outpost duty at Lawton's Plantation until August 1863.
- A detachment of Company I served at Folly Island, S.C., until July 1863, and Morris Island, S.C., to August 1863.
- The balance of Company I was on outpost duty at Hilton Head, S.C., June to August 1863.

Third Battalion was permanently detached from the 1st Massachusetts Cavalry by S. C. 346, War Department, August 4, 1863, and designated Independent Battalion, Massachusetts Cavalry.

== Casualties ==
The regiment lost a total of 239 men during service; 6 officers and 93 enlisted men killed or mortally wounded, 140 enlisted men died of disease.

== Commanders ==
- Lieutenant Colonel Samuel E. Chamberlain
- Lieutenant Colonel Greely S. Curtis - commanded at the Battle of Gettysburg
- Captain Caspar Crowninshield - commanded at the Battle of Antietam
- Colonel Horace Binney Sargent
- Major John Tewksbury
- Colonel Robert Williams
- Lieutenant Charles V. Holt

== See also ==
- List of Massachusetts Civil War units
