= Arthur R. Curtis =

19th century American officer

Arthur Russell Curtis
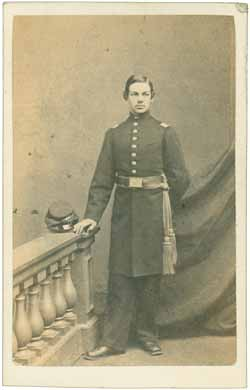
- Born: July 15, 1842; Boston, Massachusetts
- Died: April 8, 1925 (aged 82); Milwaukee, Wisconsin
- Burial place: Arlington Park Cemetery, Greenfield, Wisconsin
- Military career
- Allegiance: (United States) Union
- Branch: Union Army
- Service years: 1861 – 1865
- Rank: Lieutenant Colonel
- Commands: 20th Regiment Massachusetts Volunteer Infantry
- Conflicts: American Civil War
- Awards: Brevet Brigadier General

Arthur Russell Curtis (July 15, 1842 – April 8, 1925) was a volunteer officer in the Union Army during the American Civil War.

== Early life and education ==
Arthur Russell Curtis was born July 15, 1842, at Boston, Massachusetts.

== Civil War service ==
Curtis started the war as a private in the 4th Battalion of Massachusetts Militia. He transferred to the 20th Regiment Massachusetts Volunteer Infantry, was eventually promoted to lieutenant colonel and took command of the regiment. On December 3, 1867, President Andrew Johnson nominated Curtis for the honorary grade of brevet brigadier general, United States Volunteers, to rank from March 13, 1865, for gallant and meritorious services during the war, and the U.S. Senate confirmed the award on February 14, 1868.

== Post-war life ==
Curtis was a clerk, postmaster and world traveler after the war. Arthur Russell Curtis died April 8, 1925, at Milwaukee, Wisconsin.

== See also ==
- List of Massachusetts generals in the American Civil War
- Massachusetts in the American Civil War
