= Horace C. Lee =

American military officer (1822–1884)

Horace Clark Lee
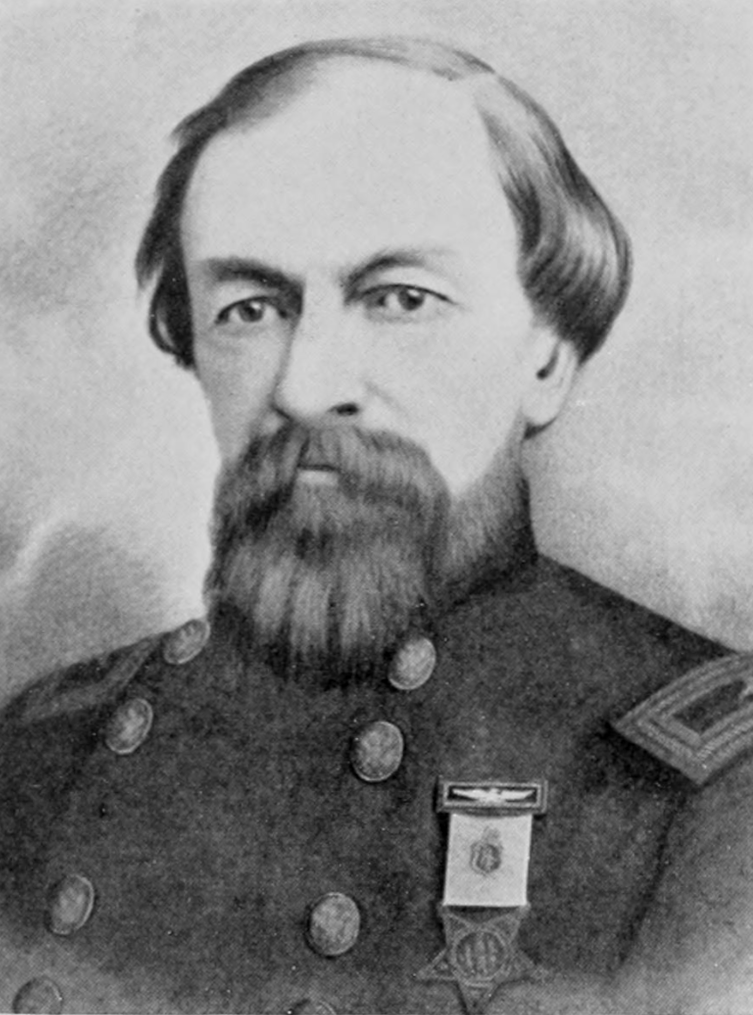
- Born: January 31, 1822; Springfield, Massachusetts
- Died: June 22, 1884 (aged 62); Springfield, Massachusetts
- Allegiance: Union
- Branch: Infantry
- Rank: Brevet brigadier general

Horace Clark Lee (January 31, 1822 – June 22, 1884) was an American Union brevet brigadier general during the period of the American Civil War. He received his appointment as brevet brigadier general dated to March 13, 1865.

== Biography ==
He served as a colonel for the 27th Regiment Massachusetts Volunteer Infantry during much of the American Civil War. Lee was born in Springfield, Massachusetts, on January 31, 1822. Before the war, Lee had worked as a dry-goods merchant, an assessor, a collector, and a treasurer for Springfield, Massachusetts. At the age of 20, he enlisted as a private in the Springfield Light Guards. Upon formation of the Springfield City Guard Company, Lieutenant Lee was elected captain. On August 23, 1861, Governor John Albion Andrew offered him the position of lieutenant colonel in the 21st Regiment Massachusetts Volunteer Infantry. On September 20, 1861, he was promoted to colonel.

He participated in the battles of Roanoke Island and New Bern in North Carolina. Upon the departure of General Burnside, Lee was appointed acting brigadier general of the Trenton Expedition. General Foster appointed him provost-marshal general of North Carolina. In May 1864, he took command of the 27th Massachusetts Infantry Regiment and fought in the battles of Walthal Junction, Arrrowfield Church, and Drewry's Bluff where he was captured and hence sent to Libby Prison in Richmond, Virginia, and Camp Oglethorpe in Macon, Georgia. He was freed in a prisoner exchange on August 2, 1864, and mustered out of the military a month later on September 27, 1864. After the war, he served multiple terms as the postmaster for Springfield, Massachusetts. He died there on June 22, 1884.
