= 20th Massachusetts Infantry Regiment =

20th Regiment Massachusetts Volunteer Infantry
- Active: August 29, 1861 – July 28, 1865
- Country: United States of America
- Allegiance: Union
- Branch: United States Army
- Type: Infantry
- Size: 1,978
- Part of: In 1863: 3rd Brigade (Hall's), 2nd Division (Gibbon's), II Corps, Army of the Potomac
- Nickname: "The Harvard Regiment"

Commanders
- Notable commanders: Col. Paul J. Revere; Col. William R. Lee; Lt. Henry L. Abbott

Insignia
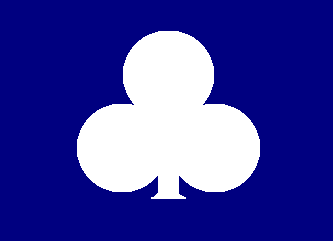
- II Corps (2nd Division) badge

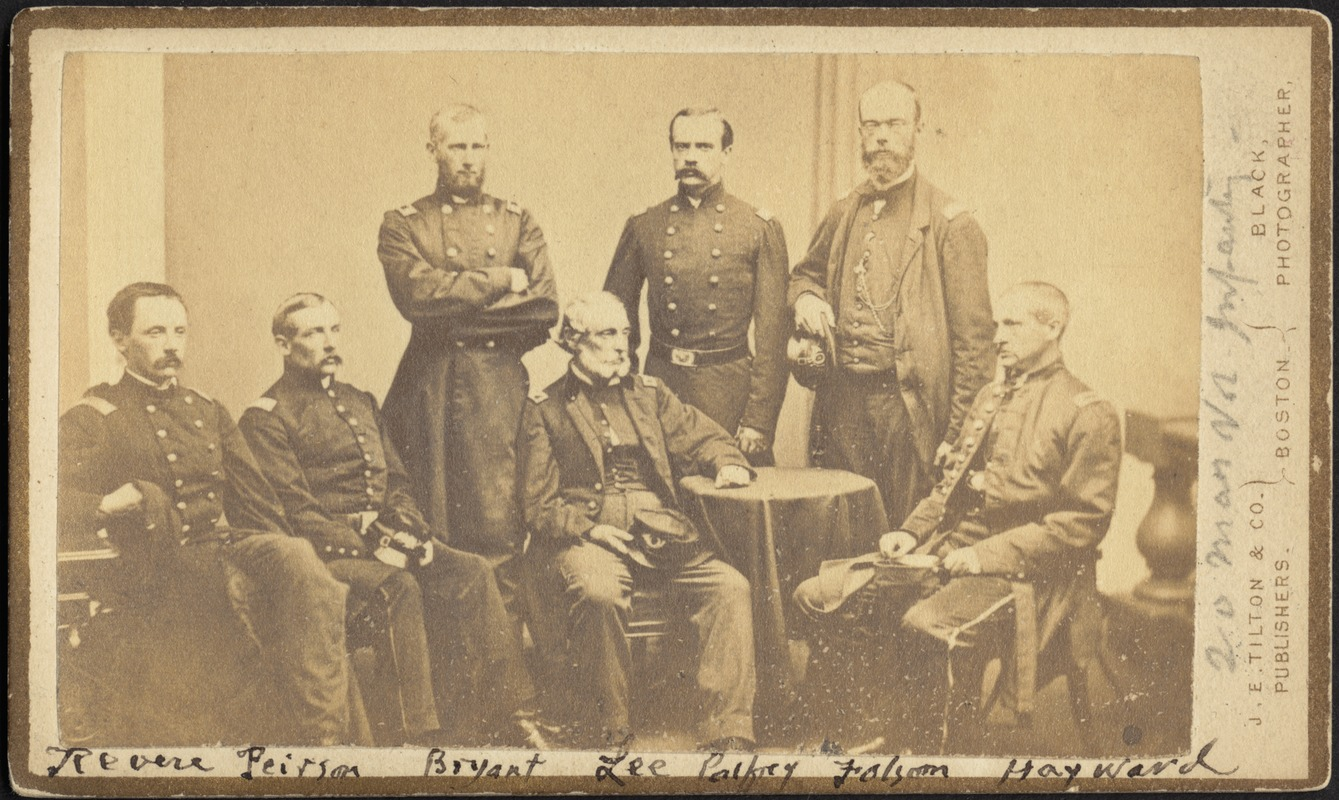
20 Mass. Infantry - Revere, Feirson, Bryant, Lee, Palfrey, Folsom, Hayward, ca. 1859–1870

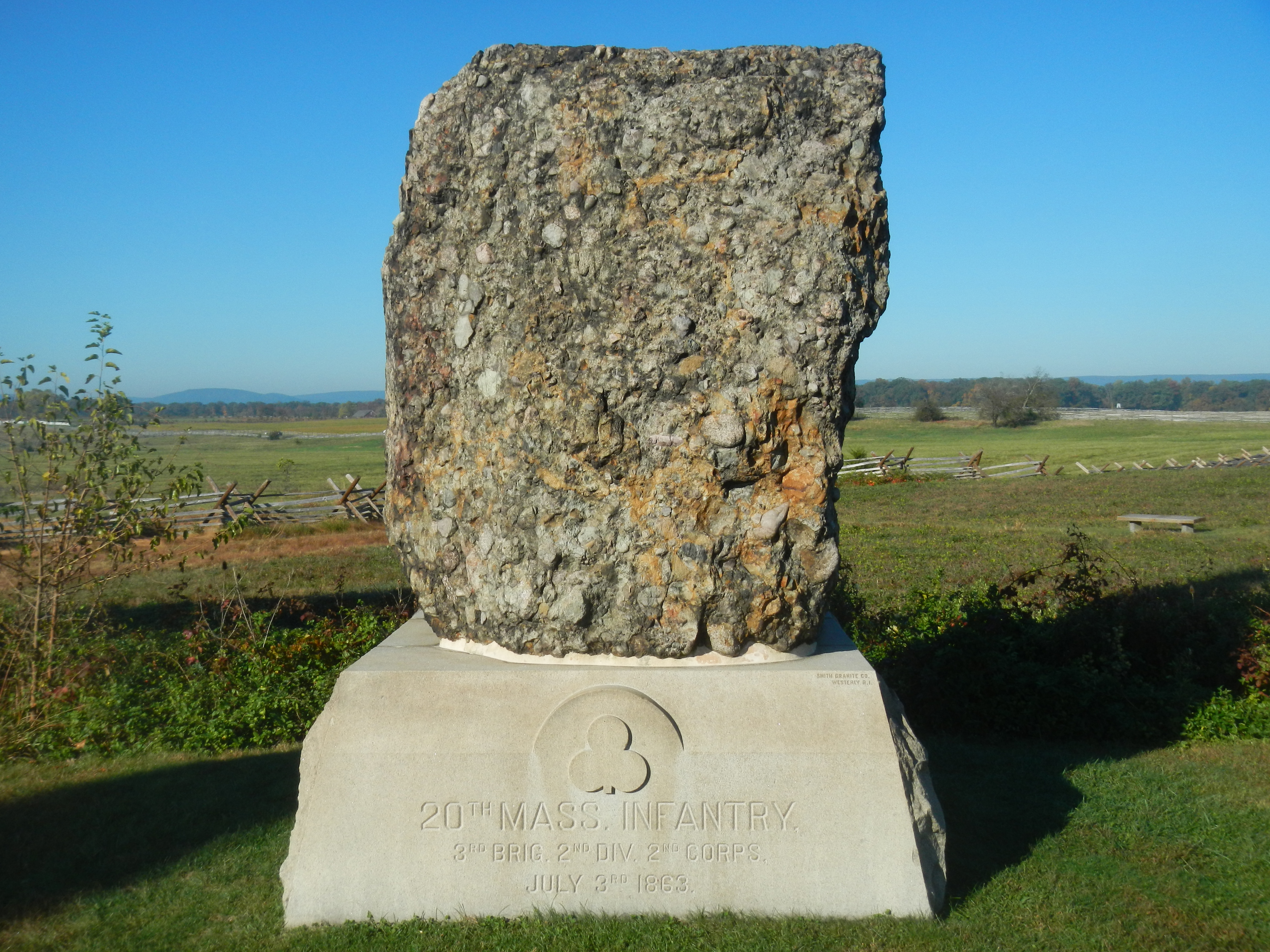
Monument to the 20th Massachusetts Infantry on the Gettysburg battlefield; Roxbury Conglomerate.

The 20th Massachusetts Volunteer Infantry, also known as the "Harvard Regiment", was a regiment of infantry in the American Civil War. The regiment was so nicknamed because the officers of the 20th were young Harvard graduates. In addition, some, but not all, of the private soldiers had attended Harvard. The 20th was organized at Camp Meigs in Readville, August 29 to September 4, 1861. After training they left Massachusetts for Washington, D. C., September 4. They would fight until the war's conclusion being mustered out on July 16 and discharged July 28, 1865. Fogel et al's Union Army Data urban sample suggests perhaps as many as two-thirds of the regiment's enlisted were immigrants with Irish immigrants making up half of the regiment's total.

== Brigade, divisional and corps attachments ==
Attached to Lander's Brigade, Division of the Potomac, to October, 1861. Lander's Brigade, Stone's (Sedgwick's) Division, Army of the Potomac, to March, 1862. 3rd Brigade, 2nd Division, 2nd Army Corps, Army of the Potomac, to March, 1864. 1st Brigade, 2nd Division, 2nd Army Corps, to July, 1865.

== Battles ==
With the exception of First Bull Run, the 20th participated in all of the major battles and many of the smaller battles fought by the Army of the Potomac. Their baptism of fire occurred at Ball's Bluff on October 21, 1861. Other battles included the Seven Days, Antietam, Fredericksburg, Chancellorsville, Gettysburg, the Wilderness, Spotsylvania Court House, the Siege of Petersburg, and the Appomattox Campaign.

== Casualties ==
The 20th regiment lost 17 officers and 243 enlisted men killed and mortally wounded, and one officer and 148 enlisted men from disease. The total casualties were 409. The regiment ranks first among Massachusetts regiments and fifth among Union regiments in total casualties.

== Notable members ==
- Henry L. Abbott
- William Bartlett
- Joseph Hayes
- Oliver Wendell Holmes Jr.
- Norwood "Pen" Hallowell
- Edward Needles Hallowell
- William Raymond Lee
- Francis Winthrop Palfrey
- Paul Joseph Revere
- Henry Martyn Tremlett

== See also ==
- List of Massachusetts Civil War units
- Massachusetts in the Civil War
