= S. Tyler Read =

American Union Civil War brevet general (1836–1880)

Samuel Tyler Read, usually known as S. Tyler Read, (May 11, 1836 – December 18, 1880) was an American Union brevet brigadier general during the period of the American Civil War. He received his appointment as brevet brigadier general dated to March 13, 1865.

Samuel Tyler Read was born on May 11, 1836, in Attleboro, Massachusetts. His parents were Henry Clifford Read and Eunice Doggett Tyler Read of Attleboro, Massachusetts. Read was a graduate of the 1860 class of Union College. In September 1861, President Lincoln authorized General Benjamin Butler to recruit a division of troops in New England, and Butler gave S. Tyler Read permission to raise a squadron of cavalry to consist of two companies. He married Kate Scofield on July 1, 1868. They had two daughters, Martha and Kathryn. Read died on December 18, 1880, in New Orleans, Louisiana.
