= 11th Massachusetts Infantry Regiment =

- Active: June 13, 1861–July 14, 1865
- Country: United States of America
- Allegiance: Union
- Branch: Union Army
- Type: Infantry
- Size: 1,932
- Part of: In 1863: 1st Brigade (Carr's), 2nd Division (Humphreys's), III Corps, Army of the Potomac
- Nickname: "The Boston Volunteers"
- Engagements: American Civil War: Manassas Campaign; Battle of Bull Run; Peninsula Campaign; Siege of Yorktown; Battle of Williamsburg; Battle of Seven Pines; Seven Days Battles; Battle of Oak Grove; Battle of Savage's Station; Battle of White Oak Swamp; Battle of Glendale; Battle of Malvern Hill; Northern Virginia Campaign; Battle of Second Bull Run; Fredericksburg Campaign; Battle of Fredericksburg; Chancellorsville campaign; Battle of Chancellorsville; Gettysburg campaign; Battle of Gettysburg; Overland Campaign; Battle of the Wilderness; Battle of Spotsylvania Court House; Battle of Cold Harbor; Appomattox Campaign; Battle of Appomattox Court House

Commanders
- Notable commanders: Col. William E. Blaisdell

Insignia
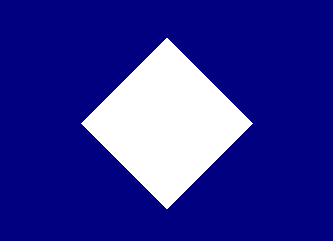
- III Corps (2nd Division) badge

The 11th Massachusetts Infantry Regiment was an infantry regiment in the Union Army during the American Civil War. Organized in Boston in May 1861, the 11th Massachusetts Infantry was made up mostly of men from Boston, but also from Charlestown and Dorchester. The leading force behind the formation of the regiment was its first colonel, George Clark Jr., who had been an officer in the Massachusetts state militia. The regiment was known as the "Boston Volunteers."

Arriving in Washington, D.C. in June, the 11th Massachusetts Infantry was one of only three Massachusetts regiments to participate in the First Battle of Bull Run. The regiment spent the early fall of 1861 helping to build fortifications around Washington. In October, the 11th was stationed at Bud's Ferry in Indian Head, Maryland where they remained on picket duty for the winter of 1861–1862. The 11th Massachusetts Infantry saw its first combat during the Peninsular Campaign in the spring of 1862. They were heavily engaged during the Second Battle of Bull Run, participated in the Battle of Fredericksburg, and suffered severe casualties at the Battle of Chancellorsville and the Battle of Gettysburg.

== See also ==
- Massachusetts in the Civil War
- List of Massachusetts Civil War units
