= William Raymond Lee =

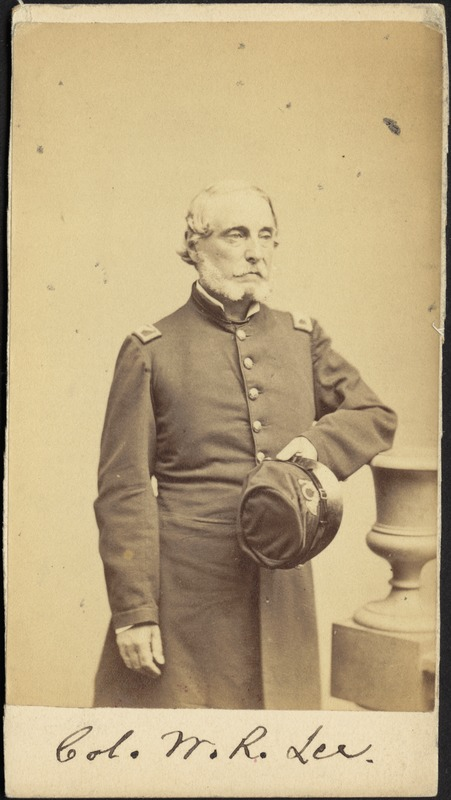
- Born: August 15, 1807
- Died: December 26, 1891 (aged 84)
- Military career
- Allegiance: United States
- Branch: Union Army
- Rank: Colonel; Brevetted Brigadier General
- Commands: 20th Massachusetts Infantry Regiment
- Conflicts: American Civil War: Battle of Antietam

William Raymond Lee (August 15, 1807 – December 26, 1891) was an officer in the Union Army during the American Civil War. He was born in Salem, Massachusetts. His father was also named William Raymond Lee and his mother was Hannah Lee (née Tracy). He married Helen Maria Amory and had 3 children: Elizabeth Amory (b. 1843), Arthur Tracy (1844–1870) and Robert Ives (b. 1846). He served as colonel of the 20th Massachusetts Infantry Regiment and led it during the Battle of Antietam. A veteran of several major battles, Lee suffered a mental break down the morning after Antietam and abandoned his regiment. According to a subordinate, Lee was found a few weeks later “without a cent in his pocket, without anything to eat, without having changed his clothes for 4 weeks, during all which time he had this terrible diarrhea…. He was just like a little child wandering away from home.” After the war ended he was brevetted brigadier general.

== See also ==
- List of Massachusetts generals in the American Civil War
- List of American Civil War brevet generals
