= William E. Blaisdell =

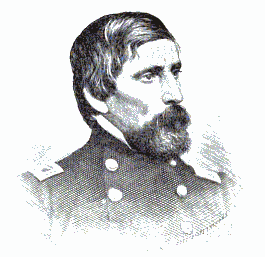
- Col. William Blaisdell
- Born: November 15, 1815; Alexandria, New Hampshire
- Died: June 23, 1864 (aged 48); Petersburg, Virginia
- Burial place: Hillside Cemetery, East Kingston, New Hampshire
- Military career
- Allegiance: United States of America; Union
- Branch: United States Army; Union Army
- Service years: 1833–1849; 1861–1864
- Rank: Colonel; Brevet Brigadier General
- Commands: 11th Regiment Massachusetts Volunteer Infantry; Corcoran Legion
- Conflicts: Mexican–American War; American Civil War

William E. Blaisdell was an enlisted man in the Regular Army of the United States prior to and during the Mexican–American War. After the Mexican War, he returned to civilian life as an inspector in the Boston Customs House. At the commencement of the Civil War he was offered the rank of captain in the Regular Army but instead chose to serve in the Volunteer Army, accepting the rank of lieutenant colonel with the 11th Regiment Massachusetts Volunteer Infantry. He was eventually promoted to colonel and the command of the 11th Massachusetts. By the summer of 1864, he was in temporary command of the Corcoran Legion. He was killed during the Siege of Petersburg on June 23, 1864, and posthumously received the honorary grade of brevet brigadier general

== See also ==
- List of Massachusetts generals in the American Civil War
- Massachusetts in the American Civil War
