= Greely S. Curtis =

Union officer in US civil war (1830-1897)

Greely Stevenson Curtis, Sr.
- Born: November 21, 1830; Boston, Massachusetts
- Died: February 12, 1897 (aged 66); Boston, Massachusetts
- Burial place: Mount Auburn Cemetery, Cambridge, Massachusetts
- Military career
- Allegiance: (United States) Union
- Branch: Union Army
- Service years: 1861 – 1865
- Rank: Lieutenant Colonel
- Commands: 1st Massachusetts Volunteer Cavalry Regiment
- Conflicts: American Civil War
- Awards: Brevet Brigadier General
- Other work: Boston fire commissioner, 1876–1878

Greely Stevenson Curtis (November 21, 1830 – February 12, 1897) was a volunteer officer in the Union Army during the American Civil War.

== Early life and education ==
Greely Stevenson Curtis was born November 21, 1830, at Boston, Massachusetts. His brother was James F. Curtis who was Colonel of the 4th California Volunteer Infantry Regiment and also was awarded the honorary grade of brevet brigadier general for faithful and meritorious services during the war.

== Civil War service ==
Curtis was a captain in the 2nd Massachusetts Volunteer Infantry Regiment. He became lieutenant colonel and commander of the 1st Massachusetts Volunteer Cavalry.

On March 28, 1867, President Andrew Johnson nominated Curtis for the award of the honorary grade of brevet brigadier general, United States Volunteers, to rank from March 13, 1865, for gallant and meritorious services during the war, and the U.S. Senate confirmed the award on March 30, 1867.

== Post-war life ==
After the war, Curtis was a civil engineer, architect and fire commissioner of Boston between 1876 and 1878. Greely S. Curtis died February 12, 1897, at Boston, Massachusetts. He is buried at Mount Auburn Cemetery, Cambridge, Massachusetts.

== See also ==
- List of Massachusetts generals in the American Civil War
- Massachusetts in the American Civil War
