= List of first female pharmacists by country =

This is a list of the first qualified female pharmacists to practice in each country, where that is known.

Please note: the list should foremost contain the first female pharmacist with a formal qualification from each country. Historically, it was normal for widows of apothecaries and pharmacist to inherit their late husband's profession without being formally qualified. These cases – and other of note – can be noted in the margin, but should not be listed first.

== Africa ==
Country	Pharmacist	Year
Benin	C. Oviasu (née Ukponmwan)	
Cameroon	Jeanne Ngo Maï	1962
Cape Verde	Judite (Judith) Lima	c. 1961
Ghana	Sackey Nee Vanderpuye	
Ivory Coast	Hortense Aka-Anghui	
Liberia	Clavenda Parker	
Libya	Wedad Muhammad Al-Senussi Al-Saqzli	1961
Mali	Rokia Sanogo	1989
Morocco	Fatima Al-Zahra Al-Warzazi	1912
Namibia	Lahya Hafeni, Anastancia Aluvilu, Fundisile Msibi, Tumo Pelekekae	2015
Nigeria	Oreoluwa Green*	1916
South Africa	Lily Heymann	1916
Togo	Abra Amédome	
Tunisia	Lucia Campisi (born in Italy)	
Uganda	Catherine Kisumba	1960
Zimbabwe	Nora Price (born in Wales; country then known as Rhodesia)	

- Namibia: There might be more female graduates, as the names listed were the only women named in the cited article.
- Nigeria: Green is considered to have been the first female pharmacist in West Africa. Ekanem Bassey Ikpeme was considered the first native female pharmacist in Nigeria.
- Tunisia: Dorra Bouzid is considered the first female pharmacist in Tunisia after independence. She started her practice sometime during the 1960s.

== Americas ==
Country	Pharmacist	Year
Argentina	Élida Passo	1885
Bahamas	Gertrude Burnside	
Bolivia	Rosa Mercedes Guerra	1921
Brazil	Maria Luiza Torrezão	1887
Canada	A. Adrienne Preevoot	1901
Chile	Griselda Hinojosa	1889
Costa Rica	Felícitas Chaverri Matamoros	1917
Cuba	María Dolores Marty and Eloisa Figueroa Marty	1886
Curaçao	Dymphna van heb Elizabeths-Gasthu	1911
Dominican Republic	Encarnación Piñeyro	
El Salvador	Mercedes Amanda Martínez and Margarita Lanza	1930
Guatemala	Olimpia Altuve	1919
Guyana	Raymonde Horth	1905
Honduras	Corina Barahona	1931
Mexico	Esther Luque Muñoz	c. 1906
Nicaragua	Elba Ochomogo Portocarrero de Hernandez	1922
Peru	Nicolasa Butler	1839
Suriname	Esseline Juliette Polanen	1936
Trinidad and Tobago	Amy Cox Rochford	c. 1927
United States	Susan Hayhurst	1883
Venezuela	María Fernández Bawden	1927

- Canada: Preevoot was considered the first Canadian woman to pass the pharmacy exam by law.
- Chile: Glafira Vargas was the first female to graduate with a pharmacy degree in 1887, though Hinojosa appears to be the first female to work as a pharmacist upon graduation.
- Curaçao: van heb Elizabeths-Gasthu was said to have been the first woman to have passed the exam for an assistant pharmacist in the colony.
- Guatemala: Altuve is considered the first Central American woman to have obtained a university degree.
- United States: Elizabeth Gooking Greenleaf was the first not formally qualified pharmacist to practice in 1727. Hayhust was the first woman to receive a pharmacy degree in the United States in 1883. Ella P. Stewart was one of the first African-American female pharmacists in the United States.

== Asia ==
Country	Pharmacist	Year
Azerbaijan	Mahbuba Valiyeva	1971
Bahrain	Layla Ahmed Abdulrahman	
India	Sneh Rani Jain	
Indonesia	Charlotte Jacobs	1879
Iraq	Josephine Bourjouni and Rahima Youssef	1940
Iran	Aqdas Gharbi and Akhtar Ferdows	1941
Israel	Sarah Mel	
Japan	Naoe Okamoto	1885
Jordan	Nabila Shoura Irsheidat	c. 1950s
Korea	Cha Soon-seok	1924
Lebanon	Zahie Barakat	1928
Nepal	Bijay Laxmi Shrestha	
Oman	Batool Jaffer	1977
Pakistan	Nasima Jamil	c. 1967
Philippines	Filomena Francisco and Matilde S. Arquiza	1908
Qatar	Zakia Malallah	
Saudi Arabia	Samira bint Ibrahim Islam	1982
Singapore	Lucy Wan	1958
Syria	Najah Saati	1949
Taiwan	Lin Caisan	1951
Thailand	Prasit Prakobnil	
United Arab Emirates	Suhaila Al-Awadi	
Vietnam	Pham Thi Hao	

- Indonesia: Jacobs is considered the first female pharmacist in the Netherlands and Indonesia (then Dutch East Indies).

== Europe ==
Country	Pharmacist	Year
Albania	Emili Dishnica Gliozheni (then known as Socialist Albania)	1961
Austria	Gisela Kun	c. 1906
Belarus	H-B. Geronimus (Taubina)	
Belgium	Jeanne Rademackers	1885
Bosnia and Herzegovina	Sarajka Ljubica Jokanovic	1914
Bulgaria	Anna Belizarova Yakova	1911
Croatia	Vjera Rojc Katušić	1913
Czech Republic	Ruzena Krontilová-Librova (then known as Czechoslovakia)	1904
Denmark	Charlotte Schou and Nielsine Schousen	1896
Estonia	Alma Tomingas	1933
Finland	Hilda Amanda Brunberg	1874
France	Hélina Leiannier-Gaboriau	1898
Germany	Magdalena Neff	1906
Greece	Polymnia Panagiotidou	1899
Hungary	Erzsébet Légrády and Thinagel Szerafin	1903
Iceland	Jóhanna Magnúsdóttir	1928
Ireland	Christina Jesop Wilson	1900
Italy	Dorina Crespi Andini	1895
Latvia	Staņislava Dovgjallo	
Lithuania	Juzefa Girdzijevska	1870
Malta	Caterina Vitale	1590
Netherlands	Aaltje Visser	1868
North Macedonia	Rajna Aleksova	1906
Norway	Helga Eide	1893
Poland	Antonina Leśniewska	1884
Portugal	Maria Serpa dos Santos	1947
Romania	Paulina Cruceanu and Clara Colesin	1892
Russia	Antonina Boleslavovna Lesnevskaya and Zinaida I. Akker	1897
Serbia	Desanka Ruvidić Okoličanin	1913
Slovakia	Ruzena Krontilová-Librova (then known as Czechoslovakia)	1904
Slovenia	Emilija Fon	1915
Spain	Dolores Rodriguez	1893
Sweden	Märtha Leth	1897
Switzerland	Clara Winnicki	1905
Turkey	Fatma Belkis Derman	1930
Ukraine	Anna Mikhailovna Makarova	1892
United Kingdom	Frances Elizabeth Deacon	1870

- Belgium: Certain sources cite Louise Popelin (sister of Belgium's first female lawyer Marie Popelin) or Ida Huys as Belgium's first female pharmacist. They both completed their exams in 1887.
- Czech Republic and Slovakia: Other sources cited Elza Fantová as the first Bohemia woman to earn a pharmaceutical degree in 1908. Krontilová-Librova started her pharmacy practice in 1904 and became the first female pharmacy student at the University of Prague in 1907 (graduating in 1909).
- Finland: The first female pharmacist to qualify without dispensation in Finland was Helene Aejneleus in 1911. Brunberg was the first women to be qualified by dispensation.
- Germany: Anne of Denmark, Electress of Saxony was a non-professional female pharmacist in Germany. Helena Magenbuch and Maria Andreae were professional pharmacists in the 16th-century.
- Ireland: Wilson was the first female pharmacist to qualify in the south of Ireland.
- Italy: Elisa Gagnatelli and Edvige Moroni were the first women to pass the pharmacy exam in 1897.
- Netherlands: In the Netherlands and the Dutch East Indies, Charlotte Jacobs became the first female pharmacist with a degree in 1879.
- Norway: Christine Dahl passed her assistant pharmacy exam in 1889, but Eide was considered the first female pharmacist.
- Poland: Although Lesniewska was considered the first female pharmacist, Filipina and Konstancja Studzinska (sisters) were the first women to pass the pharmacy examination in 1824.
- Russia: Olga Evgenevna Gabrilovich was the first female pharmacist to earn a degree in 1906.
- Sweden: Leth was the first female pharmacist to have fulfilled a formal qualification. Maria Dauerer was the first female pharmacist to have obtained a license. The first woman to have obtained a degree in pharmacology was Agnes Arvidsson (1903).
- Ukraine: Makarova, a Kiev University graduate, was the first woman to pass the examination for the title of pharmaceutical assistant.

== Oceania ==
Country	Pharmacist	Year
Australia	Caroline Copp	1880
Fiji	Lila Thakerar	1979
New Zealand	Elizabeth Robinson	1881

== See also ==
- List of first female physicians by country
- List of first women dentists by country
- Women in medicine
- Women in pharmacy
