= Women in pharmacy =

Women have served widely as pharmacists. However, as with women in many jobs, women in pharmacy have been restricted. For example, only in 1964 was the American Civil Rights Act of 1964 (Pub. L. 88–352, 78 Stat. 241, enacted July 2, 1964) enacted, which outlawed refusing to hire women because of their sex including though not limited to in the profession of pharmacist. Even today, not all countries ensure equal employment opportunities for women.

== Women in medieval pharmacy ==
Apothecary is one term for a medical professional who formulates and dispenses materia medica to physicians, surgeons, and patients; the modern pharmacist has taken over this role. Throughout medieval times, apothecaries were not trained in universities as physicians were. More often, they were trained through guilds, and apprenticeship. Apothecary businesses were typically family-run, and wives or other women of the family worked alongside their husbands in the shops, learning the trade themselves. Women were still not allowed to train and be educated in universities so this allowed them a chance to be trained in medical knowledge and healing. Previously, women had some influence in other women's healthcare, such as serving as midwives and other feminine care in a setting that was not considered appropriate for males. Though physicians gave medical advice, they did not make medicine, so they typically sent their patients to particular independent apothecaries, who did also provide some medical advice in particular remedies and healing.

== Women in modern pharmacy ==
The National Association of Women Pharmacists was founded in London on 15 June 1905, following discussions between Margaret Elizabeth Buchanan and Isabella Skinner Clarke. Early meetings were held at Clarke's home. Membership was restricted to those who had passed the major or minor examination and 50 women joined immediately. By 1912 Buchanan claimed that practically all women practicing pharmacy were members.

== Pioneering women in pharmacy ==
- Anne of Denmark, Electress of Saxony (1532–1585), while an interested amateur and not a professional pharmacist, is now considered to have been the first female pharmacist in Germany.
- Caterina Vitale (1566–1619) was the first female pharmacist and chemist in Malta, and the first female pharmacist of the Knights Hospitaller.
- Maria Dauerer (1624-1688) was first Swedish female apothecary (first formally trained female pharmacist was Märtha Leth).
- Elizabeth Gooking Greenleaf (1681–1762) was the first female apothecary in the Thirteen Colonies. She is considered to be the first female pharmacist in the United States.
- Susan Hayhurst (1820–1909) was the first woman to receive a pharmacy degree in the United States, which she received in 1883 from the Philadelphia College of Pharmacy.
- Mary Corinna Putnam Jacobi (1842–1906), who upon graduating from the New York College of Pharmacy in 1863, became the first woman to graduate from a United States school of pharmacy.
- Isabella Skinner Clarke (1842–1926) and Rose Coombes Minshull (1845–1905) became the first two women elected as full members of the Pharmaceutical Society of Great Britain in 1879.
- Margaret Elizabeth Buchanan (1865–1940) became the first woman to be elected to the Council of the Pharmaceutical Society of Great Britain in 1918, serving until 1926.
- Cora Dow (1868–1915), a pharmacist in Cincinnati, Ohio, the leading female pharmacist of her time, with eleven stores under her name when she died.
- Fanny Deacon (née Potter) became the first female pharmacist in the United Kingdom in 1870.
- Julia Pearl Hughes (1873–1950) was the first African-American female pharmacist to own and operate her own drug store.
- Jean Irvine (1877–1962) became the first female president of the Pharmaceutical Society of Great Britain in 1947, which position she held until 1948.
- Charlotte Jacobs became the first female pharmacist in the Netherlands in 1879.
- Caroline Copp became the first female pharmacist in Australia in 1880.
- In 1896 Charlotte Schou and Nielsine Schousen became the first female pharmacists in Denmark.
- Anna Louise James (1886–1977) was the first African-American female pharmacist in Connecticut.
- Ella P. Stewart (1893–1987) was one of the first African-American female pharmacists in the United States.
- Christina Jesop Wilson became the first female pharmacist to qualify in the south of Ireland in 1900.
- Kamran Aziz (1922-2017) and Ayşe Dana became the first female pharmacists in Northern Cyprus in 1944.
- Mary Munson Runge (1928–2014) became the first woman and the first African-American elected president of the American Pharmacists Association (APhA), which occurred in 1979; she was president for two terms, from 1979 to 1981.
- Remedios M. "Remy" Gabriel became the first civilian woman to become a licensed pharmacist in Guam in 1953.
- Julie Zinihite became the first Solomon Islands woman to serve as the Chief Pharmacist at the National Referral Hospital in 2010.
- Angelita Bosch was the first female pharmacist in Puerto Rico.

== See also ==
- List of first female pharmacists by country
