= Susan Hayhurst =

American physician, pharmacist

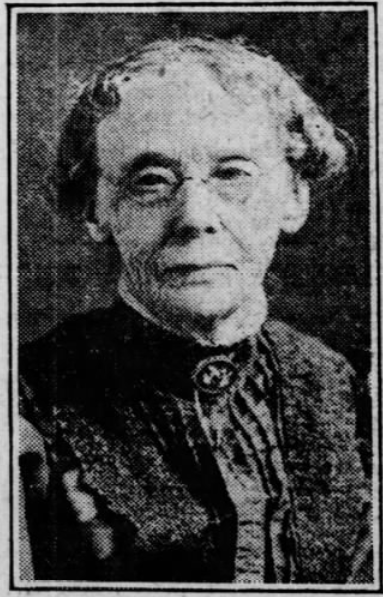
- Photo of Susan Hayhurst by Frederick Gutekunst
- Born: December 25, 1820; Middletown Township, Pennsylvania
- Died: August 7, 1909 (aged 88); Philadelphia, Pennsylvania
- Education: Philadelphia College of Pharmacy
- Occupations: Physician, pharmacist, educator

Susan Hayhurst (December 25, 1820 – August 7, 1909) was an American physician, pharmacist, and educator, and the first woman to earn a pharmaceutical degree in the United States.

== Early life and education ==
Susan Hayhurst was born in Middletown Township, Bucks County, Pennsylvania, the daughter of Quakers Thomas and Martha Hayhurst. She attended school in Wilmington, Delaware and excelled in mathematics. While a young girl, she worked as a teacher at country schools in Bucks County. Taking an interest in chemistry and physiology, she enrolled at the Woman's Medical College of Pennsylvania, and graduated with a degree in medicine in 1857.

== Career ==
Hayhurst served as principal of the Friends' School in Philadelphia from 1857 to 1867, and for a time operated her own school, which was attended by many of her former students. During the American Civil War, she was chairman of the Committee of Supplies of the Pennsylvania Relief Association.

In 1876, Hayhurst became the head of the pharmaceutical department at the Woman's Hospital of Philadelphia. To broaden her knowledge of the subject, she began attending lectures at the Philadelphia College of Pharmacy. Though Dr. Clara Marshall had previously done so, it was rare for the college to admit women, and Hayhurst was the only woman in her class of 150. The college administration did not offer any resistance, however, and granted her a diploma in pharmacy when she completed her courses in 1883, at age 63.

Hayhurst remained in her post at the pharmaceutical department of the Woman's Hospital for 33 years. She supervised the purchase and manufacture of supplies, assisted missionaries to foreign countries, and acted as mentor to 65 women pharmacists. She was a member of organizations such as the New Century Club, New Century Guild, American Academy of Political and Social Science, and Woman's Suffrage Society of Philadelphia.

Susan Hayhurst died in Philadelphia on August 7, 1909, after an illness of four days. The Philadelphia College of Pharmacy held a memorial service in her honor on November 15, 1910, and commissioned a painting of her to be hung in its museum.

== See also ==
- Elizabeth Gooking Greenleaf
- Elizabeth Marshall (pharmacist)
