= Elizabeth Marshall =

Elizabeth Marshall may refer to:

- Elizabeth Marshall (politician) (born 1951), Canadian politician
- Elizabeth Marshall (pharmacist) (1768–1836), American entrepreneur and pharmacist
- Elizabeth Marshall (cook) (fl. 1770–1790), cook who ran a patisserie and cookery school in Newcastle upon Tyne, England
- Elizabeth Marshall Thomas (born 1931), née Marshall, American author
- Betty Marshall (1918–2013), American politician
- Liz Marshall (fl. 1990s–2020s), Canadian filmmaker
