= Florence Kelley =

American activist (1859–1932)

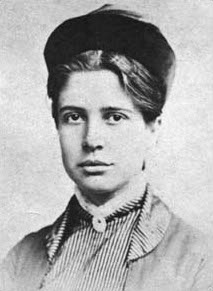
- Born: Florence Molthrop Kelley; September 12, 1859; Philadelphia, Pennsylvania, US
- Died: February 17, 1932 (aged 72); Philadelphia, Pennsylvania, US
- Resting place: Laurel Hill Cemetery
- Education: Cornell University; Northwestern University School of Law
- Occupation: Social reformer
- Spouse: Lazare Wischnewetzky (m. 1884; div. 1891)
- Children: 3
- Father: William D. Kelley

Florence Molthrop Kelley (September 12, 1859 – February 17, 1932) was an American social and political reformer who coined the term wage abolitionism. Her work against sweatshops and for the minimum wage, eight-hour workdays, and children's rights is widely regarded today.

From its founding in 1899, Kelley served as the first general secretary of the National Consumers League. In 1909, Kelley helped to create the National Association for the Advancement of Colored People (NAACP).

== Early life ==
On September 12, 1859, Kelley was born to William D. Kelley (1814–1890) and Caroline Bartram Bonsall in Philadelphia. Her father was an abolitionist, a founder of the Republican Party, a judge, and a longtime member of the US House of Representatives. He had the nickname "Pig Iron," due to his support for high duties on iron and steel.

Kelley was influenced mainly by her father and said, "I owe him everything that I have ever been able to learn to do." Throughout her early years, he read books to her that involved child labor. Even at 10, she was educated by her father on his activities, and she was able to read her father's volume, The Resources of California.

Caroline Bartram Bonsall, Kelley's mother, was not a less prominent figure. Bonsall was related to the famous Quaker botanist, John Bartram. Bonsall's parents died at a young age, she was then adopted by Isaac and Kay Pugh.

Kelley spent many years with her grandparents Isaac and Kay Pugh.

Kelley's great-aunt, Sarah Pugh, was a Quaker and opponent of slavery. Pugh's decision to deny use of cotton and sugar because of the connection to slave labor made an impression on Kelley from an early age. Pugh was an advocate for women and told Kelley about her life as an oppressed woman.

Kelley had two brothers and five sisters; all five sisters died in childhood. Three of her sisters were Josephine Bartram Kelley, Caroline Lincoln Kelley, and Anna Caroline Kelley. Josephine died at the age of ten months, Caroline died at the age of four months, and Anna died at the age of six years.

Kelley was an early supporter of women's suffrage after her sisters died and worked for numerous political and social reforms, including the NAACP, which Kelley helped found. In Zurich, she met various European socialists, including Polish-Russian medical student Lazare Wischnewetzky, whom she married in 1884 and with whom she had three children; the couple divorced in 1891. She wanted a divorce because of his physical abuse and overflowing debt. Unable to divorce her husband for "non-support," she fled to Chicago and received full custody of her children. She kept her maiden name but preferred to be called "Mrs. Kelley."

== Education ==
In her early years, Kelley was severely sick and highly susceptible to infections and so was unable to go to school for a period of time. On days that she would miss school she would be in her father's library and read many books.

In 1882, Kelley attended Cornell University at age 16. At Cornell, she was a Phi Beta Kappa member. She wrote her thesis about disadvantaged children. The topic of her thesis was influenced by her father's teaching about underprivileged children. She was one of the first women to graduate from Cornell.

Although Kelley desired to study law at the University of Pennsylvania, she was refused admission because of her gender. In the meantime, she pursued her passion for working women by founding and attending evening classes at the New Century Guild for Working Women. Later, she attended the University of Zurich, the first European university to grant degrees to women, and she joined a group of students advocating socialism.

Kelley also earned a law degree at Northwestern University School of Law in 1894. She was then able to start a school for working girls in Pennsylvania.

== Socialism and civil rights ==
Kelley as sketched in 1910 by Marguerite Martyn for the St. Louis Post-Dispatch

Kelley was a member of the Intercollegiate Socialist Society, an activist for women's suffrage and African-American civil rights. She was a follower of Karl Marx and a friend of Friedrich Engels. Her 1885 translation of the latter's The Condition of the Working Class in England into English was published with Engels' approval in 1887, under her married name "Mrs. F. Kelley Wischnewetzky," and is still used today.

After college, Kelley assisted with the establishment of the New Century Guild branch of Philadelphia, along with Gabrielle D. Clements and led by Eliza Sproat Turner. It had classes and programs to assist working women. Kelley herself taught evening classes there.

The New Century Guild intended to increase the quality of working and living condition of the lower class in urban areas. The organization helped lead the battle for labor laws, such as the minimum wage and the eight-hour days, at the local, state, and federal levels. After moving to New York City with her husband and children, Kelley organized a campaign by the New York Working Women's Society in 1889 and 1890 "to add women as officials in the office for factory inspection". By 1890, the New York legislature passed laws creating eight new positions for women as state factory inspectors.

Kelley joined the Hull House settlement house from 1891 to 1899. Hull House allowed Kelley to advance in her career by providing her a network to other social organizations and an outlet to pursue the advancement of rights for working women and children. While at Hull House, Kelley bonded with Jane Addams and Julia Lathrop, who worked together as major labor reformers. All three women were of upper-middle-class background and had politically active fathers. She also became friends with Grace and Edith Abbott as well as Alice Hamilton, a professional physician specialized in preventing occupational diseases. Kelley interacted with the Chicago Women's Club under Jane Addams' sponsorship by establishing a Bureau of Women's Labor within Hull House. As an organization, Hull House provided Kelley the opportunity to bypass male organizations in order to pursue social activism for women, who were denied participation in formal politics at the time. She is credited with starting the social justice feminism movement.

Reform of labor conditions, in line with her socialist commitments, led to Kelley having pioneering roles in factory inspection, in organizing social movement pressure on employers, and in advocating for reform legislation and legal action over the course of her career (see below).

Kelley contributed to or led a variety of social organizations including National Child Labor Committee, National Consumers League, National Conference of Social Workers, American Sociological Association, National American Woman Suffrage Association, NAACP, Women's International League for Peace and Freedom, and the Intercollegiate Socialist Society.

== Factory inspection and child labor ==
Kelley's father had toured her through glass factories at night when she was young. Kelley fought to make it illegal for children under the age of 14 to work and to limit the number of hours for children under 16. She sought to give the children the right of education, and argued that children must be nurtured to be intelligent people, beginning with her efforts in Philadelphia and New York.

The breakdown of her marriage led Kelley to flee from New York to Chicago at the end of 1891. While Kelley lived at Hull House from 1891 to 1899, her leadership of the settlement's Bureau of Women's Labor allowed her to take initiative against exploited labor of women and children in home and factory "sweatshops".

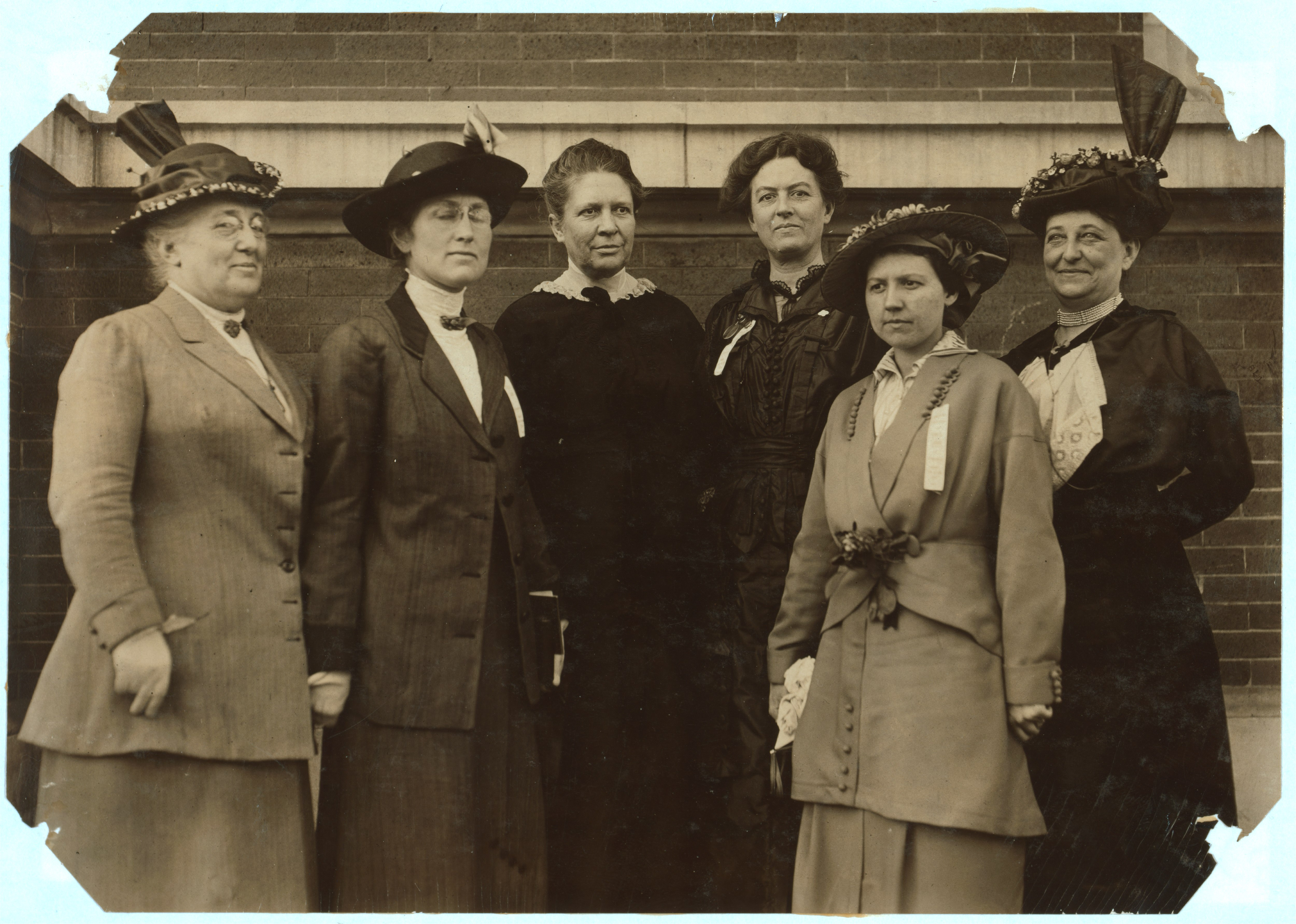
Florence Kelley among other factory inspectors

In 1892, Kelley conducted a survey of Chicago's slums at the request of U.S. Commissioner of Labor, Carroll D. Wright, after Henry Demarest Lloyd recommended her. The survey uncovered children from three-years-old working in "overcrowded tenement apartments". The survey also revealed women overworked past exhaustion, workers risking pneumonia, and children with burns. Related Congressional hearings led to the growth of reform interest within Illinois, which Kelley joined in organizing. She became a leader in a coalition of labor and civic groups to campaigning on behalf of the reform legislation. She and her allies brought state legislators on tours of sweatshops.

Later in 1892 Kelley proposed investigating the "sweating system", "the practice of contracting out work to homes of the poor," in Chicago to the Illinois Bureau of Labor Statistics. She persuaded the bureau to hire her as a Special Agent to investigate the labor conditions of Chicago's garment industry. In her report, she described research that discovered employees working up to 16 hours a day, seven days a week with some wages that are not high enough to support the family.

The coalition campaign and Kelley's research led to new state labor reform legislation in 1893. The Illinois legislature passed the first factory law limiting work for women to eight hours a day and prohibiting the employment of children under the age of fourteen. These protective labor laws are sometimes identified as the start of the Progressive Era in social reform.

As part of the implementation of the reforms, Kelley became the first woman to hold statewide office when Governor Peter Altgeld appointed her to the post of Chief Factory Inspector for the state of Illinois, a newly created position and unheard-of for a woman. She chose five women and six men to assist her. Hull House resident Alzina Stevens served as one of Kelley's assistant factory inspectors.

In the course of her Hull House work, she befriended Frank Alan Fetter when he was asked by the University of Chicago to conduct a study of Chicago neighborhoods. At Fetter's motion, she was made a member of Cornell's Irving Literary Society as an alumna, when he joined the Cornell Faculty.

Kelley was known for her firmness and fierce energy. Hull House founder Jane Addams' nephew called Kelley "the toughest customer in the reform riot, the finest rough-and-tumble fighter for the good life for others, that Hull House ever knew."

== NAACP and work on racial equality ==
Asked by William English Walling and Mary White Ovington, Kelley became a founding member of the NAACP. As a member of the board of directors, she belonged to committees on Nomination, The Budget, Federal Aid to Education, Anti-Lynching, and the Inequality Expenditure of School Funds. According to W.E.B. DuBois, Kelley was well known for asking pointed questions to find a course of action. Her public discussions covered black people in churches, social welfare forums, and social inequality.

In 1913, she studied the federal patterns of distribution of funds for education. She noticed a lot of inequitable distributions for white schools as opposed to black schools. That launched her to create the Sterling Discrimination Bill, which was an attack against the Sterling Towner Bill, which proposed a federal sanction of $2.98 per capita for teachers of colored children and $10.32 per capita children at white schools in 15 schools in the South and Washington, D.C. The NAACP held the position that it would perpetuate the continual discrimination and neglect of the public schools for black people. She and W. E. B. DuBois disagreed on how to attack this bill. She wanted to add the language that guaranteed equitable distribution of funding regardless of race. DuBois believed that there should be a clause added specific to race because it would require the federal government to enforce that the schools for black people to be treated fairly.

Kelley believed that if anything was added about race to the bill, it would not pass through Congress. She wanted to get the bill passed and then to change the language. Therefore, when the bill was passed, it called for equal distribution to the schools to be handled by the states based on population. The issue remained on whether or not the states would distribute the money equally.

Kelley disagreed with the NAACP and W.E.B. DuBois on other issues as well. The Sheppard-Towner Act was the most contentious issue of disagreement between them. The act provided aid to mothers and children during pregnancy and infancy. The NAACP and DuBois were opposed to the bill because there were no provisions to prevent discrimination in the distribution of funds to black mothers. Unlike her stance on equitable distribution of educational funds, Kelley was not demanding any provisions for equitable distribution, as she knew the bill would never pass if the issue of race was introduced, especially with the opposition already present from southern states. Kelley believed that it was more important to pass the legislation, even in its limited form, so that the funding would be secured and the primary principle of social welfare would be established. Eventually, Kelley, earned the support of the NAACP on the issue with the promise to monitor the bill if it passed and to work tirelessly toward the equity of all, regardless of race.

In 1917, she marched in the New York silent protest parade, opposing the violence of white citizens against black people in the East St. Louis, Illinois, race riots of that year. To pressure anti-lynching onto Congress, she appealed National Women's League of Voters to support the Dyer Anti-Lynching Bill in 1922. Despite the League's lack of action, Kelley provided a series of letters to Arthur B. Spingarn of the NAACP in 1926 about the many cases of lynching in the United States. To gain support from the media, Kelley also suggested for newspaper editors who opposed lynching to be published.

Kelley used her power in Congress by her personal connections to avoid discrimination from being passed in laws, especially toward expenditure toward school funds. In 1921, she pushed the Board of Directors of the NAACP to oppose bills that discriminate based on race in expenditure toward school funds. Kelley is famous for creating the tradition of protest against racial discrimination, which occurred in the mid-20th century.

With the release of "Birth of a Nation," Kelley and other NAACP leaders demonstrated in numerous cities against the film for representing a racist interpretation of black people. In 1923, Kelley struggled for admission of the National Association of Colored Women as members of the Women's Joint Congressional Committee, which formed in 1920. She succeeded by January 1924, when 15 of 17 organizations included NACW members.

== National Consumers League and eight-hour day ==
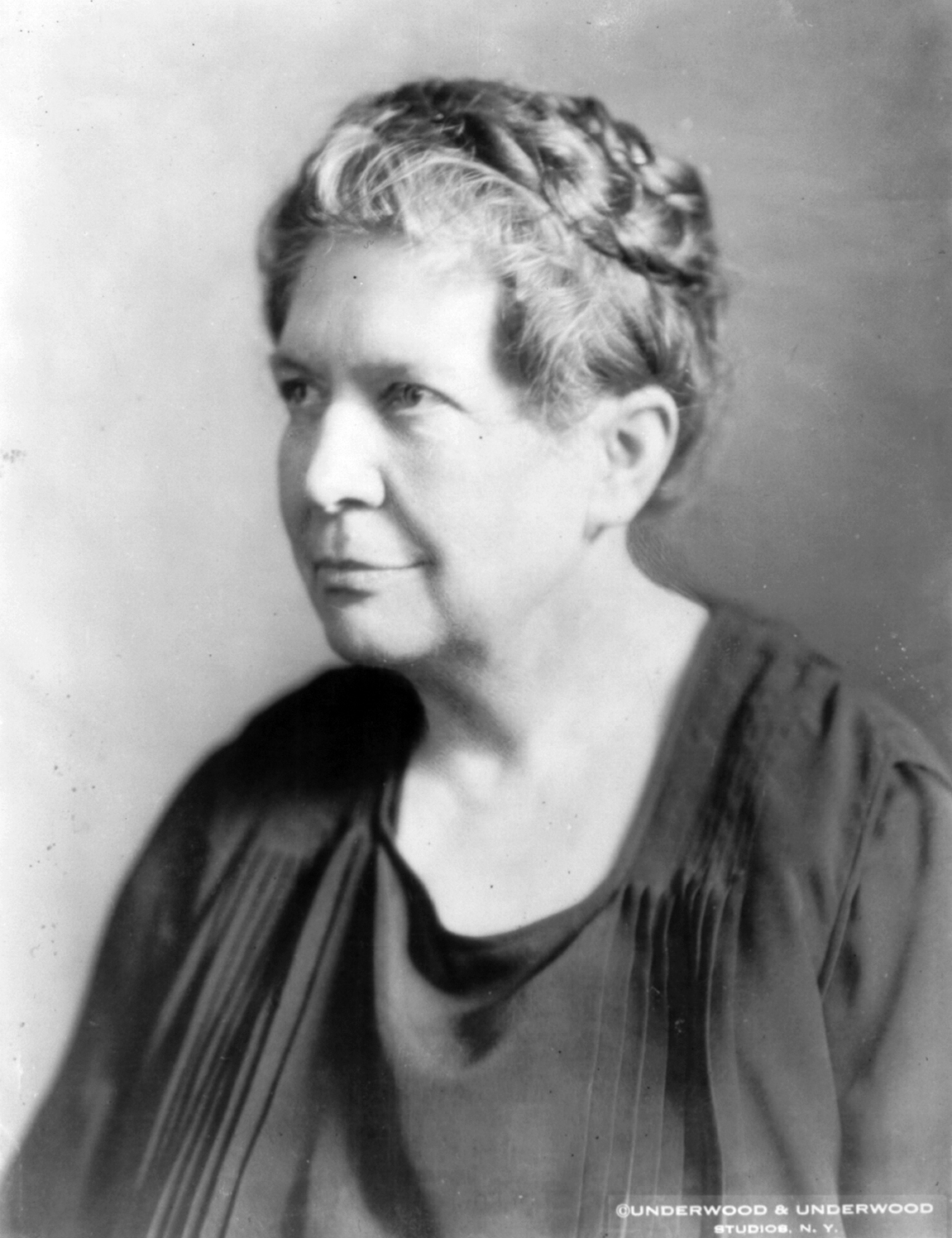
Kelley in 1925

From 1899 through 1926, she lived at the Henry Street settlement house in New York City. From there, she founded and acted as General Secretary of the National Consumers League, which was strongly anti-sweatshop. She used her direction to raise public awareness and pass state legislation to protect workers, primarily for women and children. The Consumers' League established a Code of Standards that served to raise wages, shorten hours, and require a minimum number of sanitary facilities. Kelley used the NCL to address her own policies such as local hours and wages of women via data collection and activism. Kelley also served as a mentor to younger activists, such as Mary van Kleeck, who briefly worked for the Consumers League.

In her work there, she built 64 Consumers Leagues to promote and to pass labor legislation. Kelley often acted as a representative to address state legislators and expanded the NCL network through women's clubs. She worked hard to establish a workday limited to eight hours. In 1907, she threw her influence into a Supreme Court case, Muller v. Oregon, an attempt to overturn limits to the hours female workers could work in non-hazardous professions. Kelley helped file the famous Brandeis Brief, which included sociological and medical evidence of the hazards of working long hours and set the precedent of the Supreme Court's recognition of sociological evidence, which was used to great effect later in Brown v. Board of Education. Her pursuit to enforce the eight hour work day for women was later declared unconstitutional by the Illinois Supreme Court in 1895 because it restricted women from making contracts for longer hours.

In 1909, Kelley helped create the NAACP and thereafter became a friend and ally of W. E. B. Du Bois. She also worked to help improve child labor laws and working conditions.

In 1917, she again filed briefs in a Supreme Court case for an eight-hour workday, now for workers "in any mill, factory or manufacturing establishment," in the case Bunting v. Oregon.

Kelley's NCL sponsored a "Consumer's 'white label'" on clothing that restricted garment production with child labor and working conditions against state law. She led the National Consumers League until her death, in 1932.

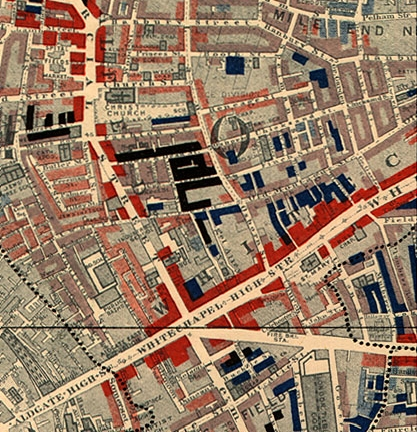
Part of Booth's map of Whitechapel, 1889. The red areas are "well-to-do"; the black areas are "semi-criminal".

== Hull House Maps and Papers ==
Kelley created a series of maps and data visualizations for Hull House Maps and Papers, a series of essays published in 1895. Along with the United States Bureau of Labor and Carroll D. Wright, the information was collected by going door to door in Chicago neighborhoods and polling the community using questionnaires.

Utilizing a cartographic design by Charles Booth, the data collected through community questionnaires is displayed on specific parcels of land, creating a highly detailed street-view map.

- Ely, Richard T. Hull-House Maps and Papers. Thomas Y. Crowell & Company. (1985); maps created by Kelley are on pgs 257-264

== Other accomplishments ==
In 1907 Kelley organized New York’s Committee on Congestion of Population, after which she and Mary Kingsbury Simkhovitch sponsored an exhibit on the causes and consequences of congestion and methods for alleviating it, catalyzing the first National Conference on City Planning in 1909.

Kelley worked with Josephine Goldmark to provide the information organized by lawyer Louis Brandeis in what became known as the Brandeis Brief to demonstrate the harmful effects of overtime on women's health. The action helped support arguments in Muller v. Oregon in 1908, although the U.S. Supreme Court ruled against the women laundry workers in the case.

Kelley also helped lobby Congress to pass the Keating-Owen Child Labor Act of 1916, which banned the sale of products created from factories that employed children thirteen and under. In addition to this act, she also lobbied for the Sheppard-Towner Act, which created the nation's first social welfare program to fight against maternal and infant mortality by funding health care clinics specialized in those areas.

In 1912, she formed the US Children's Bureau, a federal agency to oversee children's welfare.

== Death ==
Kelley died, age 72, in the Germantown section of Philadelphia on February 17, 1932. She was interred at Philadelphia's Laurel Hill Cemetery.

She was named an Angel hero by The My Hero Project.

== Publications ==
The responsibility of the consumer. New York City: National Child Labor Committee, 1908.

Kelly argues that it is the responsibility of the consumer to use their buying power to discourage moral ills regarding work conditions, such as child labor. Succinctly put, she argues for the modern phrase, "vote with your dollar." Further, in order to judge labor conditions, she argues that citizens must demand adequate statistics about such conditions from their state and federal governments.

The Present Status of Minimum Wage Legislation. New York City: National Consumers' League, 1913.

Provides a brief history of the beginnings of minimum wage legislation in England and the United States. Kelley cautions the states against drawing up too quickly a hastily and poorly written law such that a court may strike it down thereby setting a precedent for similar laws. Finally, Kelly briefly explores how society ultimately bears the cost for not paying a sufficient minimum wage, through caring for the poor and through the maintenance of prisons.

Modern Industry: in relation to the family, health, education, morality. New York: Longmans, Green 1914.

Women in Industry: the Eight Hours Day and Rest at Night, upheld by the United States Supreme Court. New York: National Consumers' League, 1916.

Twenty Questions about the Federal Amendment Proposed by the National Woman's Party. New York: National Consumers' League, 1922.

Notes of Sixty Years: The Autobiography of Florence Kelley. Chicago: C.H. Kerr Pub. Co., 1986.

The Need of Theoretical Preparation for Philanthropic Work. 1887.

Kelly emphasizes the need for a theoretical background prior to engaging in philanthropic work. Without such background, she argues, the type of philanthropic work chosen will most likely reproduce the current capitalist socioeconomic system that leads to the need for philanthropic work in the first place. In essence, one needs theoretical preparation in order to treat the causes rather than the symptoms.

She argues for this by distinguishing between two types of philanthropy: bourgeois philanthropy and philanthropy of the working class. Bourgeois philanthropy "aims to give back to the workers a little bit of what our social system robs them of, propping up the system longer," (92) thus it is fundamentally palliative, preserving the current system in place. Philanthropy of the working class, on the other hand, aims to weaken the capitalist system through goals such as shortening the work day and limiting the working of children. These measures result in a lower amount of surplus value produced which is antithetical to the capitalist system.

After such a theoretical preparation, Kelley concludes that real philanthropic work consists in elevating class consciousness.

== Sources ==
- Amico, Eleanor B., ed. Reader's Guide to Women's Studies (Fitzroy Dearborn, 1998)
- Sklar, Kathryn Kish, and Beverly Wilson Palmer, eds. The Selected Letters of Florence Kelley, 1869–1931 (Urbana: University of Illinois Press, 2009). lxii, 575 pp. ISBN 978-0-252-03404-6
