= Carl Benjamin =

British YouTuber and political commentator (born 1979)

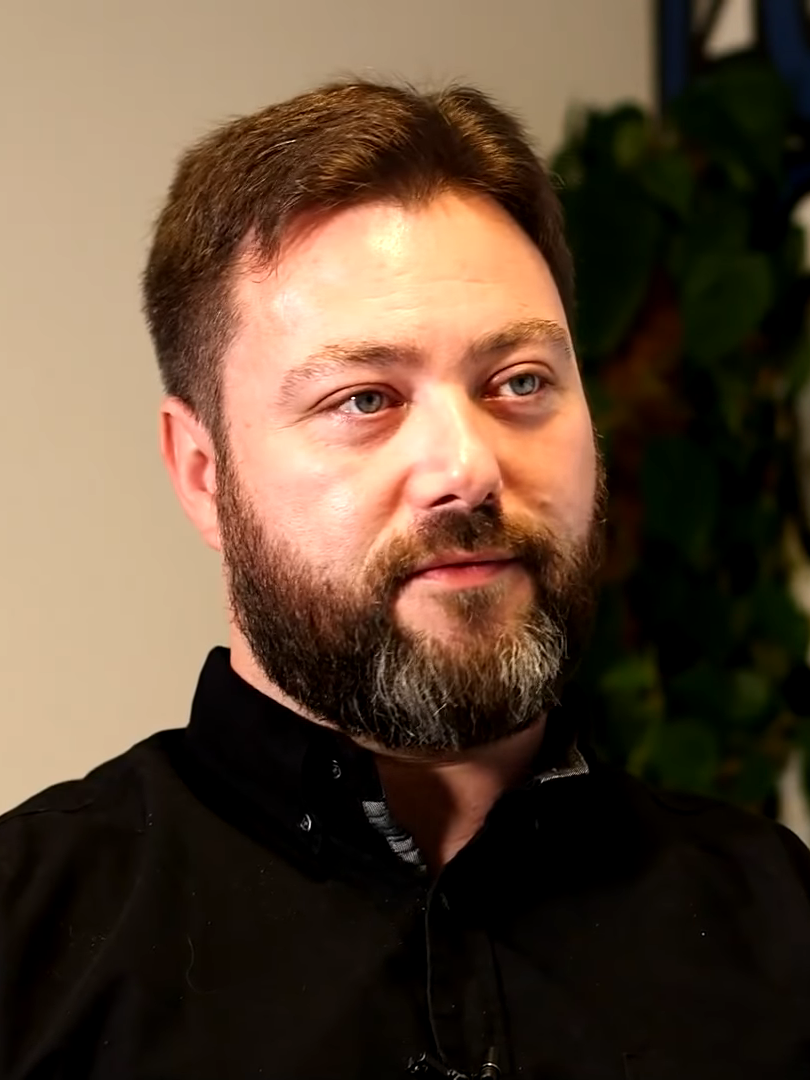
- Benjamin in 2018
- Born: Carl Charles Benjamin; 2 September 1979 (age 47); Swindon, Wiltshire, England
- Education: Birkbeck, University of London (BA)
- Occupations: YouTuber; Political commentator
- Political party: Restore Britain (since 2025)
- Other political affiliations: UKIP (2018–c. 2020)

YouTube information
- Channel: Sargon of Akkad
- Genres: Commentary; culture; politics
- Subscribers: 967 thousand
- Views: 31.4 million
- Benjamin's voice
- Last updated: 19 June 2026
- Website: Official website

Carl Charles Benjamin (born 2 September 1979), also known by his online pseudonym Sargon of Akkad, is a British right-wing YouTuber and political commentator. A former member of the Eurosceptic UK Independence Party (UKIP), he was one of its unsuccessful candidates for the South West England constituency at the 2019 European Parliament election.

During the Gamergate harassment campaign, Benjamin promoted the conspiracy theory that feminists were infiltrating video game research groups to influence game development. Since Gamergate, he has focused on promoting Brexit and criticising feminism, Islam, identity politics, and what he views as political correctness in the media and other institutions. Benjamin has been described as politically right-wing and far-right by multiple outlets. Whereas he previously denied these descriptions and identified as a classical liberal, he now rejects liberalism, and espouses right-wing populist and Trumpian views.

== Early life ==
Carl Charles Benjamin was born on 2 September 1979, in Swindon, Wiltshire. Benjamin's paternal grandfather, a Black man from Saint Helena, moved to England in the 1960s, wherein he met and later married his white English wife. Benjamin had spoken of how his mixed-race father had suffered racial difficulties during the 1970s growing up in England.

== YouTube career ==
Benjamin's YouTube channel drew attention during the Gamergate harassment campaign in 2014. Inside Higher Ed said his videos on the topic advanced a conspiracy theory in which he argued members of the Digital Games Research Association (DiGRA) were actively plotting to influence video game development, saying DiGRA "became co-opted by feminists to become a think tank by which gender ideologues can disseminate their ideology to the gaming press and ultimately to gamers." He also posted content that was critical of feminist video game critics and academics and posted content that was critical of feminism in general. That year, Benjamin said that he had named his channel Sargon of Akkad because he was "a lover of history and the lessons it can teach us."

At VidCon 2017, media critic Anita Sarkeesian appeared on a panel discussing online harassment directed towards women. A group of YouTubers who had frequently criticised Sarkeesian in the past, including Benjamin, filled one half of the first three rows of the audience and filmed Sarkeesian as part of a targeted harassment campaign against her. Sarkeesian singled out Benjamin as a serial harasser of hers, calling him a "garbage human." The event went viral among both critics and supporters of Sarkeesian. Benjamin accused Sarkeesian of abuse and cyberbullying and said that he would have wanted to know how she "would like to be approached"; in a blog post, Sarkeesian wrote:

[Benjamin] makes over $5,000 a month on Patreon for creating YouTube videos that mock, insult and discredit myself and other women online, and he's not alone. He is one of several YouTubers who profit from the cottage industry of online harassment and antifeminism.

Hank Green, the founder of VidCon, issued a statement that the group's actions were clear "intimidating behaviour" and apologised for the situation "which resulted in [Sarkeesian] being subjected to a hostile environment that she had not signed up for." Patreon also investigated the claims of harassment but determined that although they considered his actions "distasteful," Benjamin had not violated their code of conduct.

In March 2018, Antifa protesters broke into a scheduled discussion between Benjamin and Yaron Brook by King's College London's Libertarian Society at the school. Masked protestors attacked security guards, set off smoke bombs, broke windows, and set off a fire alarm. The event organisers called the police, cancelled the event, and evacuated the building. The organiser reported that two security guards were hospitalised.

Patreon banned Benjamin in December 2018, when he was earning over US$12,000 a month. According to Patreon, Benjamin violated the site's rules on hate speech by using "racial and homophobic slurs to degrade another individual." A number of users, including Sam Harris, Jordan Peterson, and Dave Rubin, left the platform following the ban of Benjamin, with Benjamin and Rubin moving onto Peterson's service Thinkspot.

Harris stated that he did not "share the politics of the banned members" but objected to what he described as "political bias" on Patreon. After explaining why they dropped Benjamin, Patreon published a transcript of a YouTube video in which Benjamin stated that members of the alt-right were "acting like white niggers" because "Exactly how you describe Black people acting is the impression I get dealing with the Alt-Right." He added that "White people are meant to be polite and respectful to one another." Later in the video, Benjamin stated, "Don't expect me to have a debate with one of your faggots." In response to this transcript, Benjamin said that his targets were not Black or homosexual and argued that the epithet "nigger" is not offensive in Britain, unlike in the United States. Benjamin also argued that the comments had been taken out of context.

In May 2019, YouTube suspended Benjamin's Sargon of Akkad channel from the YouTube Partner Program. In May 2019, Benjamin was suspended from Twitter. His account was reinstated in November 2022, a few weeks after Elon Musk took control of the platform.

In November 2020, Benjamin launched Lotus Eaters, a podcast platform, which takes its name from Lotus-eaters from Homer's Odyssey. In May 2024, former prime minister Liz Truss appeared as a guest on Tomlinson Talks, a show hosted for the site by Connor Tomlinson. In response, Labour MP Jess Phillips, about whom Benjamin had previously made a rape joke saying he "wouldn't even rape her," urged Rishi Sunak, Truss's successor as prime minister and leader of the Conservative Party, to deselect Truss as a candidate.

== Political career ==
In response to Jess Phillips's statement that rape threats are commonplace for her, Benjamin said in May 2016, "I wouldn't even rape you #AntiRapeThreats #FeminismIsCancer" in a YouTube video and repeated this on Twitter. He declined to apologise for the comment. Benjamin was investigated by West Midlands Police for the comment, and a police spokesperson said he was "dealt with by way of words of advice."

In June 2018, Benjamin joined the UK Independence Party (UKIP), along with YouTuber Mark Meechan, better known by his online name Count Dankula, and far-right conspiracy theorist Paul Joseph Watson. The trio's membership was described by political analysts as part of a shift to the far-right in UKIP under Gerard Batten's leadership. In the European Parliament's 2019 elections in the United Kingdom, Benjamin was second on UKIP's list for the South West England constituency. Benjamin was not elected, with his party getting only 3.22% of the vote in his native South West England constituency (a drop of 29.1% from 2014) and losing both of its seats in the region, as well as all twenty-two of its seats across the rest of Britain.

At a UKIP press conference announcing his candidacy, Benjamin again declined to apologise for his comment about Phillips, saying "a decent person doesn't laugh about male suicide" and that he would apologise if Phillips apologised for her position on men. Benjamin also stated that she was being a "giant bitch" for "laughing about male suicide," and so he was justified in being a "giant dick back." Phillips had previously critiqued the idea of a "men's day" but also said that male suicide is a serious issue.

In response to the controversy, the chairman of the Swindon branch of UKIP called for Benjamin to be deselected, which was rejected by Batten. Later in the campaign, Benjamin made additional negative comments about Phillips, saying he might rape her, but "nobody's got that much beer." He said this was a joke and was empowering to victims of rape, because "it's a lot more empowering to not be controlled by jokes." The University of the West of England cancelled a hustings event for fears of disturbances, and both Gloucester Cathedral and Exeter Cathedral banned him a few days later from a separate election event it was hosting. In 2024, Benjamin apologised to Phillips for the joke, saying he had changed since he made it and did not want to be a corrosive force in British politics.

In February 2020, Benjamin launched the group Hearts of Oak with the British far-right activist Tommy Robinson and former UKIP members. Members of the group say that it is not a political party but a "cultural movement" focused on "strong borders, immigration, and national identity," "authorities privileging and protecting Islam alone," and "freedom of speech." He has also served as an advisor to Great British PAC, a far-right pressure group.

By 2026, Benjamin had joined Restore Britain, becoming its Swindon branch organiser. Around this time he would start to take money from Restore to promote their views. His website Lotus Eaters and many of his Youtube video descriptions currently bare the following text:"Promoted by Lotus Eater Media Limited, PO Box 4354, Swindon, SN3 9FX, on behalf of Restore Britain, Suite 4, Millennium House, Gapton Hall Road, Great Yarmouth, Norfolk, NR31 0NL."

== Political views ==
Benjamin is an anti-feminist. He is also an advocate for Brexit and a critic of Islam, and has argued for a reduction in immigration to the UK from majority Islamic countries. He has opposed online feminist movements such as the British group Reclaim the Internet, which he called "social communism." Following the 2014 Isla Vista killings, Benjamin said that social justice feminism was a "disease of the modern age" that had disenfranchised and radicalised young men, causing a rise in the number of mass murders.

In the 2016 United States presidential election, Benjamin initially supported Bernie Sanders, later saying that Donald Trump was the lesser of two evils, compared with Hillary Clinton.

While on a panel in New York City in 2018, he said, "Jewish people, unfortunately for them, have got to drop the identity politics. I'm sorry about the Holocaust, but I don't give a shit. I'm sorry." In May 2018, Benjamin was a speaker at a right-wing "Day of Freedom" rally in support of Tommy Robinson, after Robinson was banned from Twitter for hate speech. At the rally, Benjamin voiced opposition to "totalitarianism, identity politics, and Islamism."

News outlets, journalists, and academics have described Benjamin as right-wing and far-right. Vox has described him as anti-progressive. He has been described as alt-right by The Sunday Times and The Jewish Chronicle, and has been linked to the alt-right by news media and researchers, including Newsweek, Salon, The Guardian, Wired UK, and Data & Society. The Daily Dot compared Benjamin to the alt-right due to his anti-feminism and criticisms of Islam and Black Lives Matter, frequent subjects of criticism by the alt-right. Vice and PC Magazine have described him as a conspiracy theorist. Benjamin has described himself as a "classical liberal" or "English liberal", and has said that he opposes the alt-right. He has argued that the alt-right's authoritarian and collectivist thinking is a reaction to comparable racism against white people from the left. Benjamin has also described himself as a "sceptic."

== Personal life ==
He lives with his family in Swindon. In October 2020, he stated he was an atheist. In April 2025, Benjamin reaffirmed his atheistic belief, though stated that he was pro-Christianity because "it is the traditional religion of the West" and that "the future that the atheists are opening up to us are where man... is just material blob living in a meat sack, living on a rock, and so there's nothing sacred about him..."

In 2023, Benjamin graduated from Birkbeck, University of London with a Bachelor of Arts degree in philosophy.
