= Altuve =

Altuve is a surname. Notable people with the surname include:

- Jose Altuve (born 1990), Venezuelan baseball player
- Olimpia Altuve (1891–1987), Guatemalan scientist
- Oriana Altuve (born 1992), Venezuelan footballer

== See also ==
- Altube
