= Susan Lyon =

Susan Lyon may refer to:

- Susan Lyon, Countess of Strathmore and Kinghorne, Scottish noble
- Susan Reeve Lyon, English apothecary

== See also ==
- Sue Lyon, American actress
- Susan Lyons, Australian actress
