= Louise Stockton =

American author and journalist (1838–1914)

Louise Stockton (August 12, 1838 – June 12, 1914) was an American author, journalist, and club organizer. Early in life, she became associated with local newspapers and for many years contributed as editorial writer, her musical and book criticisms attracting wide attention at the same time. She achieved fame through her untiring efforts in spite of a lifelong deformity.

== Early life and education ==
Louise Stockton was born in Philadelphia, Pennsylvania, on August 12, 1838. She came of a distinguished family of Philadelphia writers. Her parents were William Smith, an author and reformer, and Emily Hepzibeth (Drean) Stockton. Louise had several siblings from this marriage, including Francis Richard and John Drean, as well as several half-siblings from her father's earlier marriage, including the writer, Frank R. Stockton.

She was educated at home, and began to write as a child.

== Career ==
Stockton was engaged as editorial writer, book and music editor (1867–71) upon the Philadelphia Post. She edited the "Woman's Edition" of The Philadelphia Press, November 27, 1875. In 1876, she was one of the editors of the New Century for Women, a Centennial newspaper published on the exposition grounds at Philadelphia. In 1878, she was leader-writer for John Weiss Forney's Progress. She had charge of the "Reading Club" department in Scribner's Book Buyer, 1896–97. Subsequently, Stockton was associated with various leading journals as editorial writer, book editor, and music critic.

Stockton was president of the West Philadelphia Centre University Extension, 1894–97. She was a co-founder of the New Century Club, the Browning Society, and the Contemporary clubs.

Stockton was the originator and president of the Round Robin Reading clubs, a national correspondence organization. The club was an outgrowth of the literature class of the New Century Club of Philadelphia. It became an independent enterprise of the former chair, Louise Stockton, and was carried on largely by correspondence, and later through the pages of Scribner's Magazine. The purpose of the Round Robin was to furnish outlines and programs to the literary and study clubs. This work was initiated and carried on for Massachusetts by Susan Ticknor, of Boston. Stockton broadened its scope and tool in a larger area. The courses were found particularly valuable to teachers and leaders of classes. Round Robin had no textbooks, but used standard literature. Its members selected their own subjects, endeavoring to make them acquainted with whatever illustrates or elucidates their work, and to interest them in the best books, and thus assist in the proper use of public libraries. The membership fee was US$.50, the cost of the courses according to the number of persons using them.

Stockton was the author of Dorothea, a novel (1882); A Sylvan City (1883); republished as Quaint Corners; Apple Seed and Briar Worn (1887), and of several novelettes, many short stories, and historical essays in magazines.

== Personal life ==
She was residing in Philadelphia in 1903. Louise Stockton died in Buffalo, New York, on June 12, 1914.

== Selected works ==
=== Novels ===
- The Christmas Thorn, and Other Stories (1881) (text)
- Dorothea, a novel (1882) (text)
- Apple Seed and Briar Worn (1887) (text)

=== Short stories ===
- "Kirby's Coals of Fire" (December 1875, Atlantic).
- "A Dead Vashti" (April 1877, Galaxy).
- "Sylvia's Suitors" (August 1880, Atlantic).
- "The Occultation of a Honeymoon" (January 1881, Lippincott's).
- "Caspipina, the Story of a Mother Church" (A Sylvan City, 1883) (text)
- "The Old Philadelphia Library" (A Sylvan City, 1883)
- "The Bettering-House and Other Charities" (A Sylvan City, 1883)
- "Stephen Girard, Mariner and Merchant" (A Sylvan City, 1883)
- "Her Lover" (April 1884, Lippincott's).
- "A Devil's Passage" (December 1888, Atlantic).
