= Sarah Catherine Fraley Hallowell =

American journalist

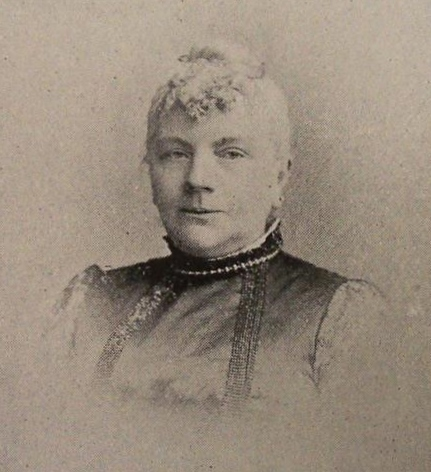
Sarah Catherine Fraley Hallowell

Sarah Catherine Fraley Hallowell or Sarah Cresson Fraley Hallowell (1833–1914) was an American journalist. She was editor of The New Century for Women, editor of the Public Ledger in Philadelphia and founder and first president of the New Century Club.

== Personal life ==
Sarah Catherine Fraley, born on July 8, 1833, was the daughter of Frederick Fraley, who was the Western Savings Fund president. For 21 years he served as the president of the American Philosophical Society, the second longest serving president behind Benjamin Franklin. Her mother was Jane Chapman Cresson Fraley and her siblings were Elizabeth, Mercy and Joseph.

Hallowell was the second wife of Joshua Longstreth Hallowell, whose brother was abolitionist and businessman, Morris Longstreth Hallowell. They had a daughter, Jean Fraley Hallowell. The family lived in Germantown and were on Philadelphia's Social Register.

She was related by marriage to art curator and exhibition organizer Sarah Tyson Hallowell.

== Career ==
Hallowell was editor of New Century for Women, editor of the Public Ledger in Philadelphia and founder and first president of the New Century Club.

She attended the Woman's Medical College of Pennsylvania and a member of the Pennsylvania Women's Suffrage Association.

=== New Century for Women ===
New Century for Women was an eight-page weekly paper created and managed by the Women's Centennial Executive Committee of Philadelphia. It was "devoted to the Industrial interest of women" by promoting choice, equal pay for equal work, and greater financial and social autonomy.

=== New Century Club ===
The New Century Club was a woman's organization that was established in 1877 to improve the lives of women. It had committees for working women, municipal affairs and self-education. Rather than portraying the opinions of the "radical" viewpoints of some of its members, the Hallowell, its first president, said that they only "whispered... [the] logic of suffrage." As the organization evolved, they moved into social reform.

=== Public Ledger ===
Hallowell was the associate editor, literary editor, and writer of "Household" for the Public Ledger. She was at the Ledger for 18 years. beginning in 1877.

== Death ==
She died on March 17, 1914, in Philadelphia, Pennsylvania.

== Published works ==
- Sarah Catherine Fraley Hallowell (1877). Nan; the new fashioned girl. John S. Marr & Sons.
- Sarah Catherine Fraley Hallowell. On the Church Steps.
- Sarah Catherine Fraley Hallowell (contributor). Young Folks' Cyclopedia of Stories. D. Lothrop Company. 1886.
