= Eliza Sproat Turner =

American poet and suffragette (1826–1903)

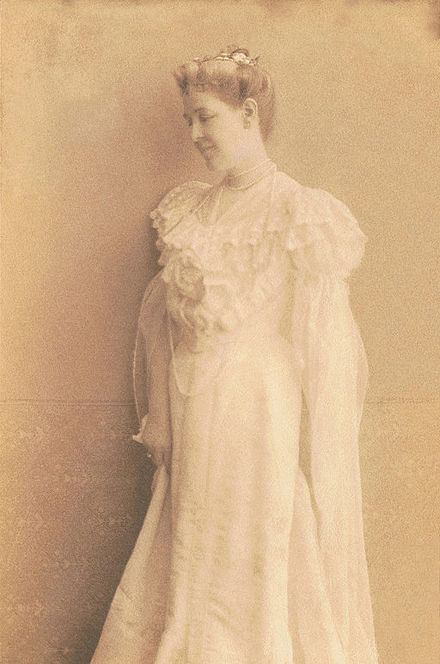
- Born: Eliza L. Sproat; 1826; Philadelphia, Pennsylvania, U.S.
- Died: June 20, 1903 (aged 76–77); Chadds Ford, Pennsylvania, U.S.
- Occupations: Poet, women's club leader, suffragette
- Spouse: Nathaniel Randolph (m. 1855; died 1858) Joseph C. Turner (m. 1864; died 1902)

Eliza L. Sproat Turner (1826 – June 20, 1903) was an American writer, women's club founder and leader, abolitionist, and suffragette. Turner began her adulthood as a teacher and writer, and soon after became involved in a number of social causes. She was a member of the Philadelphia Female Anti-Slavery Society and was a leader of the Women's Congress and the publication of the New Century for Women newspaper for the Philadelphia Centennial Exposition of 1876. The following year she helped found the New Century Club women's club and in 1882 was instrumental in the establishment of the New Century Guild of Working Women. Her poetry and viewpoints about women's issues were published in newspapers and magazines.

== Personal life ==
Eliza L. Sproat Turner was born in 1826 in Philadelphia, Pennsylvania. Her father was a writer and farmer from Vermont, who died when Turner was a young girl. Her mother, Maria Lutwyche, came to the United States with her parents and two sisters about 1818 from Birmingham, England and settled in Philadelphia. Turner was raised a Quaker with a brother and attended Philadelphia public schools.

Turner married Nathaniel Randolph in 1855 "out of meeting". He was a wealthy lumber merchant and a devout Quaker. They had a happy, but short marriage. Turner gave birth to their son, Nathaniel Archer on November 7, 1858, following Randolph's unexpected death. Good friends Margaret Burleigh and Mary Grew, as well as Turner's mother, Mary Sproat, described as a lovely, gracious woman, lived with Turner and her son. All of the women believed in women's rights and equal pay.

During the Civil War she met Joseph C. Turner when both volunteered to assist the wounded at Gettysburg. Eliza provided nursing care to the wounded. In 1864, Eliza and Joseph Turner were married. They had a country estate in Chadds Ford, Pennsylvania called Windtryst and a townhouse in Philadelphia. Joseph Turner stopped practicing law and became a retailer and dairy farmer.

Turner's son became a physician after attending the University of Pennsylvania, had a family, and died in 1887. Joseph Turner died in October 1902. Eliza Sproat Turner died June 20, 1903, eight months after the death of her husband, at Windtryst, Chadds Ford, Pennsylvania. Florence Earle Coates wrote "In Memory: Eliza Sproat Turner", which was published in her book Mine and Thine in 1904.

== Educator ==
Turner taught for several years at the Philadelphia public schools and from 1850 to 1853 at Girard College.

== Writer ==
While working as a teacher, Turner wrote poetry and prose, which was published in magazines and newspapers, like National Era, Sartain's Magazine, and Graham's Magazine. In 1847, "The Enchanted Lute" was published in the Christian Keepsake. In the 1840s and 1850s, her works appeared in anthologies of women's writing. Out-of-Door Rhymes was a collection of Turner's poetry published by James R. Osgood in 1872. She wrote the poem An Angel's Visit for her friend Margaret Burleigh.

Her writing began to reflect her interest in the feminist movement and suffrage. The Rooster-Pecked Wife was a satire of life of the married woman. She wrote Four Quite New Reasons Why You Should Want Your Wife to Vote in 1875 as she became engrossed in the suffrage movement. She wrote Nobody to Blame in 1887 about a woman, used to the city life, who became a farmer's wife and lamented over having "a mind that is never consulted, a will that is never respected". She contributed non-fiction articles to magazines, like the Boston Woman's Journal, about women's issues.

== Activist ==
Turner joined the Philadelphia Union of Associationists in 1847 and the Philadelphia Female Anti-Slavery Society in the 1850s. She helped found the Pennsylvania Woman Suffrage Association in 1869, and she was its first corresponding secretary. At the Philadelphia Centennial Exposition of 1876, Turner was a leader of the Women's Congress and distributed the newspaper New Century for Women that she wrote and edited at the Women's Pavilion. The New Century Club women's club was founded in Philadelphia in 1877 following a stirring paper that Turner delivered at the Women's Congress. Turner was the president from 1879 to 1881 and the first corresponding secretary of the literary, social and community organization. Evening classes were held for working girls and women and the success of the endeavor led to the founding of the New Century Guild of Working Women in 1882. It held vocational classes, philosophy and history study groups, and activities. It had a clubhouse with a dining room and library. The women's club continued after Drexel Institute assumed responsibility for the classes in 1892.

Turner brought poor children from the city to stay in the summer at her country estate for a week. In 1875, she developed a formal program, the Children's Country Week Association of Philadelphia based upon her efforts. She was a founding member of Philadelphia's consumer's league and director of the Society for the Prevention of Cruelty to Animals.

== Works ==
=== Author ===
- Eliza Sproat Turner (1865). How Do the Marys Feel?.
- Eliza Sproat Turner (1875). "An Angel's Visit". In John Greenleaf Whittier (ed.). Songs of Three Centuries. Houghton, Mifflin and Company. pp. 271–272.
- Eliza Sproat Turner (1903). Out-of-door Rhymes. J.B. Lippincott.

=== Anthologies ===
- Otto Dickman (1880). Modern American Lyrics. F.A. Brockhaus. p. 276.
  - Eliza Sproat Turner, If
  - Eliza Sproat Turner, An Old Butterfly
- Louise Stockton; Edwin Atlee Barber; Elizabeth Robins; Eliza S. Turner; Helen Campbell; Frank Willing Leach (1883). A Sylvan City: or, Quaint Corners in Philadelphia. Our Continent Publishing Co.
  - Eliza Sproat Turner, Public Schools
- The Yellow Ribbon Speaker: Readings and Recitations. Lee and Shepard. 1891.
  - Eliza Sproat Turner, An Appeal
  - Eliza Sproat Turner, Crows and Blackbirds
  - Eliza Sproat Turner, The Coming Woman
  - Eliza Sproat Turner, What To Do
  - Eliza Sproat Turner, A Girl of the Period
- Eliza Sproat Turner (1906). "A Little Goose". In Benjamin N. Black (ed.). Black's Graded Readers. J.M. Stradling & Company. pp. 231–234.
- Eliza Sproat Turner (1910). "A Stray Child". In Phineas Garrett (ed.). One Hundred Choice Selections: A Repository of Readings, Recitations, and Plays Comprising Eloquence and Sentiment; Pathos and Humor; Dialect and Impersonations, Etc. Penn Publishing Company. p. 146.
