= Altube =

Altube is a surname. Notable people with the surname include:

- Miguel Altube (born 1960), Argentine field hockey player
- Pedro Altube (1827–1905), Basque-born American rancher

== See also ==
- Altuve
