= Agnes Arvidsson =

Swedish pharmacist

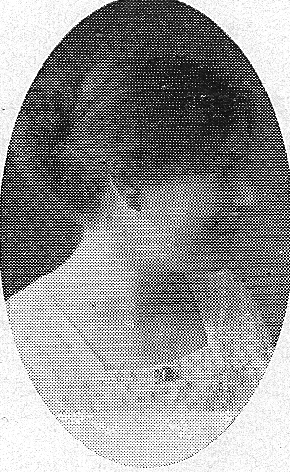

Agnes Hildegard Arvidsson (1875–1962), was a Swedish pharmacist. She was the first Swedish pharmacist of her gender to have obtained a degree in pharmacology (1903). However, Märtha Leth did obtain a bachelor's degree in pharmacology in 1897, and by the time Arvidsson acquired her degree, there were already in fact 30 female pharmacists in Sweden.

Arvidson served as an apprentice at the Pharmacy Lejonet in Malmö, took her bachelor's degree in 1901 and her degree at Farmaceutiska institutet 17 September 1903. Women were expressly allowed to become pharmacists in 1891. In 1928, Arvidsson became the manager of her own pharmacy, and could be considered the first of her gender in that position as well; while widows had always been allowed to manage pharmacies after having inherited the license from their late spouses, Arvidsson was the first female pharmacy manager to have acquired her license herself. She manage the Norsjö Pharmacy in 1928-1933 and the Mellerud Pharmacy in 1933–1942.

== Sources ==
- Farmacihistoriska föreläsningar: Farmaceututbildningen, läst 19 februari 2010
- Dagny 1903, s. 321: Kvinnan på apotekarebanan
- Apotek som arbetsmarknad - Institutionell förändring och feminisering av apotek i Sverige, Maria Stanfors & Klas Öberg i Historisk Tidskrift 2007:2
- En liten historisk återblick om Risliden av Lars-Åke Lundgren, läst 19 februari 2010
