= Elizabeth Gooking Greenleaf =

Pharmacist from Massachusetts, USA (1681–1762)

- Born: Elizabeth Gooking; November 21, 1681 [O.S. November 11, 1681] Cambridge, Massachusetts Bay, British America
- Died: November 22, 1762 [O.S. November 11, 1762] (aged 81)
- Occupation: Pharmacist
- Years active: 1727–1762
- Spouse: Samuel Greenleaf (m. 1699)

Elizabeth Gooking Greenleaf (November 11, 1681 – November 11, 1762) was the first female apothecary in the Thirteen Colonies. She is considered to be the first female pharmacist in the United States.

== Biography ==
Elizabeth Gooking was born in Edison, Province of New Jersey in 1681, the daughter of Samuel and Mary Gooking. She married minister, physician, and apothecary Daniel Greenleaf (a Harvard graduate) in 1699. The couple had twelve children.

In 1727, Elizabeth moved to Boston to open an apothecary shop. Though this was a role which had been exclusively performed by men, Massachusetts did not have any laws in place to prevent women from practicing. This made her the only woman among the 32 apothecaries working in New England at the time.

Later in 1727, Daniel moved to Boston to join her after resigning his post as pastor of the Congregational Church in Yarmouth. They ran the shop together for several decades.

Elizabeth Gooking Greenleaf died in 1762, followed by her husband in 1763.

She was one of 17 women to be honored by the American Pharmacists Association in 2012, for "contributions to the profession and advancement of women in pharmacy."

== See also ==
- Susan Hayhurst
- Elizabeth Marshall (pharmacist)
- Maria Dauerer
