= Jeanne Rademackers =

Belgian pharmacist

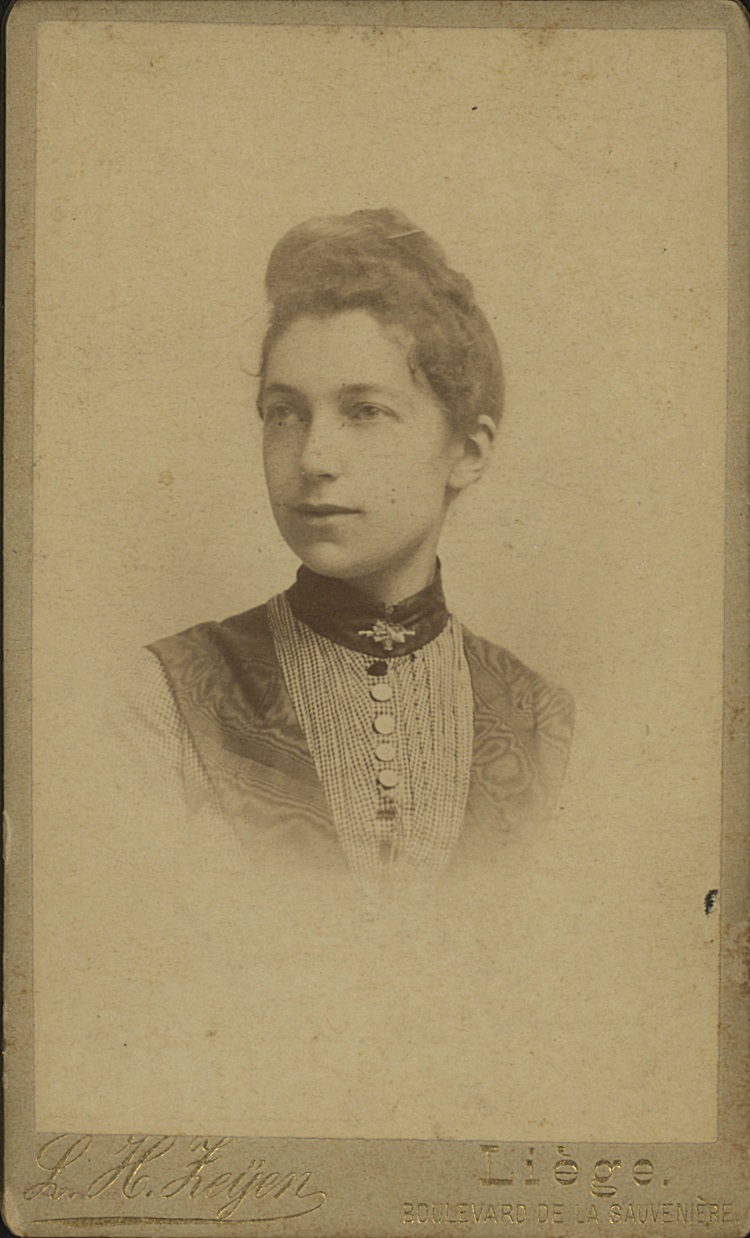
Rademackers circa 1881

Jeanne Rademackers (1862–1920) was a Belgian pharmacist.

She became the first female pharmacist in Belgium after completing pharmacy training in 1885 amidst an exclusively male cohort at the University of Liège.
