= Clara Marshall =

American physician, educator and author (1847–1931)

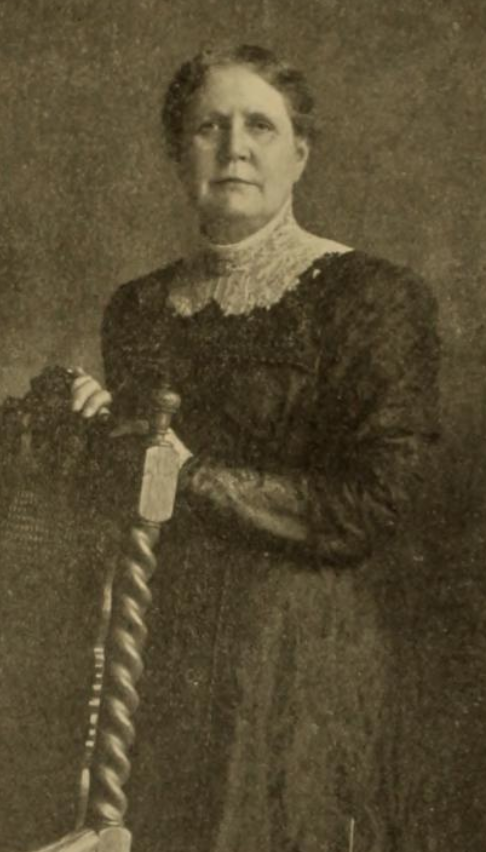
- Clara Marshall, from the 1911 yearbook of the Woman's Medical College of Pennsylvania
- Born: May 8, 1847; West Chester, Pennsylvania, U.S.
- Died: March 13, 1931 (aged 83); Bryn Mawr, Pennsylvania, U.S.
- Education: Woman's Medical College of Pennsylvania
- Occupations: Physician, educator

Clara Marshall (May 8, 1847 – March 13, 1931) was an American physician, educator, and author. She was dean of the Woman's Medical College of Pennsylvania from 1888 to 1917.

== Early life and education ==
Clara Marshall was born in West Chester, Pennsylvania, the daughter of prominent Quakers Mary and Pennock Marshall. She initially worked as a schoolteacher, and at age 24 she enrolled in the Woman's Medical College of Pennsylvania. Her instructors included Rachel Bodley (chemistry), Ann Preston (physiology), Emeline Horton Cleveland (obstetrics), and Mary Scarlett-Dixon (anatomy).

She graduated with a degree in medicine in 1875, and due to her exceptional skill was immediately made a demonstrator of materia medica and therapeutics. Some members of the college board disputed Marshall's appointment due to her lack of experience, but she was able to overcome their objections. To further her knowledge of the subject, she attended lectures at the Philadelphia College of Pharmacy in 1876, becoming the first woman to do so. After this she was made a professor of materia medica and therapeutics at the Woman's Medical College, a title she would retain until 1905.

== Career ==
In 1882 Marshall was the first woman to join the faculty of Blockley Medical College, as a demonstrator in obstetrics. In her 1897 book The Woman's Medical College of Pennsylvania: An Historical Outline, she praised chairman John Huggard for offering her the opportunity, writing: "To this gentleman, more than to any other, belongs the honor of extending more fully to women the clinical advantages of this great hospital." In 1886 she became an attending physician at the Girls' Department of the Philadelphia House of Refuge.

Marshall became dean of the Woman's Medical College in 1888, after the death of Rachel Bodley. During her tenure, her achievements included expanding degree programs from three to four years, increasing the number of subjects taught, and instituting an entrance exam. In 1896 she oversaw the establishment of the first professorship in bacteriology and a laboratory for its instruction. She encouraged students to author academic papers, and in 1895 compiled a list of over 500 such publications. In 1904, Marshall's fundraising efforts resulted in the construction of Pavilion Hospital on the college grounds. From 1907 to 1913 this was expanded to the larger College Hospital. She retired as dean in 1917 and worked in private practice until shortly before her death from arteriosclerosis in 1931.

Marshall was a member of organizations such as the Philadelphia County Medical Society, the Obstetrical Society of Philadelphia, the Medical Society of the State of Pennsylvania, and the American Medical Association. She was a founding member of the New Century Club, and advocated for women's suffrage and the admission of women to medical societies. She was a school board member and a school director in Philadelphia's Eighth Ward.
