= Paulina Cruceanu =

Romanian pharmacist

Paulina Cruceanu (26 February 1865– 29 November 1921) was a Romanian pharmacist. She was the first female pharmacist in Romania. She qualified with a bachelor's degree at the University of Bucharest, and worked in a series of hospital pharmacies before becoming head of a Medicines Depot at Iaşi for three years. Cruceanu obtained permission to open her own pharmacy, but before she was able to do so, she died after a traffic accident in which she lost both legs.

== Life ==
Cruceanu was born on 26 February 1865, in Iaşi, to a Jewish family. She attended the "Ştefan cel Mare" gymnasium in Iaşi, and enrolled to study pharmacy at the University of Bucharest. She began her pharmaceutical internship at the Minerva pharmacy in Roman, completing the mandatory three-year internship. In November 1887 she received her certificate as a pharmacy assistant. From 1888 to 1891, she studied in the Faculty of Medicine at the university, in order to qualify to practice. Receiving her bachelor's degree in 1891, she became the first female pharmacist in Romania.

Cruceanu worked as a teacher for a period, and then as a pharmacist at the Otetelis Hospital in Vâlcea. A series of short appointments followed. In 1904 she moved to the Cocioc Rural Hospital in Ilfov, and the following year to the pharmacy of Fierbinţi Hospital, and then the pharmacy of the "Anton Cincu" Rural Hospital in Nicoreşti, Tecuci. In 1917 she was appointed as the head of the Medicines Depot of Iaşi, a position she gained with the support of Professor Alexandru Obregia. In 1921, at the end of the war, she was responsible for transferring the depot to Bucharest.

Cruceanu obtained permission to open her own pharmacy in the town of Lugoj in Caraş-Severin in 1921, but an accident on 27 November prevented her from carrying out her plans. She slipped under the wheels of a horse-drawn tram, and both her legs were severed. She died two days later, on 29 November 1921, in the Colţea Hospital in Bucharest. She was buried at the "Reînvierea" Cemetery in the capital.
