= Susan Reeve Lyon =

- Born: London
- Occupation: Apothecary
- Spouses: William Reeve; William Lyon (m.1627)

Susan Reeve Lyon (died after 1632), was an English apothecary, active in London. Born in London to Dutch parents, she was married first to William Reeve and later to William Lyon. Despite restrictions on women and foreigners, she was allowed to work as an apothecary with her first husband and to continue the business after his death. The Company of Apothecaries also judged that she was sufficiently skilled to supervise her second husband's training as an apothecary after her remarriage.

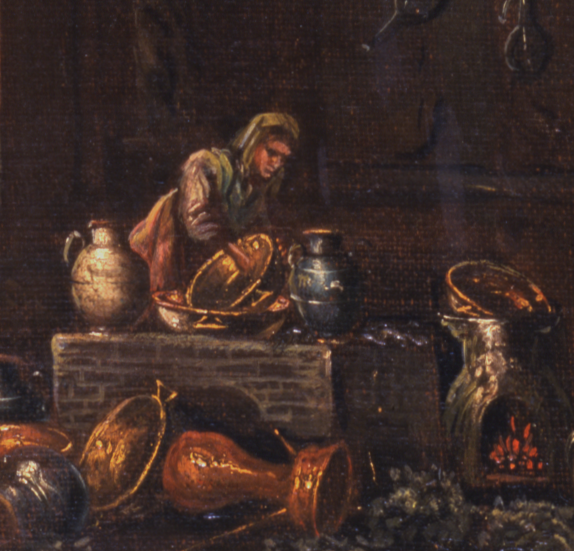
17th-century female apothecary, detail from Early Italian Pharmacy, gift of Fisher Scientific International, Science History Institute

== Ownership and accreditation ==
The activities of apothecaries in London were policed by the Company (or Society) of Apothecaries, chartered in 1617. Apprenticeship was a lengthy process, requiring a seven-year training period. This guild had the right to enter and investigate the premises of anyone exercising any part of "the Art or Mystery of Apothecaries" in the city of London and its environs, and to decide whether they were competent. Foreigners were barred from membership in the guild. Women could not attend university to obtain formal training. Married women could not legally own property, but it was possible for the widow of an apothecary to take over her husband's pharmaceutical business if she could convince the London guild that she was competent to do so.

Susan Reeve, although she was of Dutch extraction, had been born in London. Her first husband, William Reeve, came from Wesel in the Duchy of Cleves. Nonetheless, the Company of Apothecaries allowed Susan and William Reeve to work as apothecaries. In 1617 they were recorded as living within the walls of London on Aldgate Street, and in 1618 in Limestreet Ward. In 1619, records show that William Reeve attended Lady Townshend. After William Reeve's death, Susan Reeve was considered competent to own and manage the business as a widow and to supervise an apprentice, Thomas Beedham.

== Remarriage ==
In 1627 Susan Reeve remarried, to William Lyon. The Apothecaries guild did not consider her new husband to be sufficiently skilled to practice as an apothecary, describing him as "No artist." Susan, however, was judged to be skilled. In 1629, the Court of Assistants of the Society of the Apothecaries decided that she would be allowed to supervise her second husband and ensure that he acquired the skills considered necessary by the guild.

== The College of Physicians ==
Reeve's preparations were purchased by medical practitioners such as Arnold and Gerard Boate, for resale to their patients. The Boates had qualified as doctors at Leiden University, but as Dutch physicians were at first considered "irregular practitioners" not approved to practice by the College of Physicians of London (CPL). As a result, in 1632, Susan Reeve Lyon was prosecuted by the College of Physicians for selling medicines to an unlicensed physician. The college did not, however, question the quality of the medicines she prepared or her credentials as an apothecary.
