= Social justice feminism =

Feminist philosophy

Social justice feminism is the practice of recognizing issues of oppression dealing with race, class, sexuality, and citizenship and challenging them through practice rather than theory. This form of feminism allows for a broader audience beyond the white middle aged women who began the movement. It actively fights racism and class privilege by "ensuring that those most affected by policies and practices are at the decision making table." It advocates for more women of color in leadership roles and allows recognition for global gender justice and women's rights.

== Florence Kelley ==
In response to the obstacles women faced in the workplace involving wages, hours, and conditions, Florence Kelley from Philadelphia initiated and coined the term social justice feminism in the early 1900s. Kelley envisioned the passage and implementation of labor legislation for working women. When Kelley died in 1932, Melly Dewson, her protege, took over the movement.

== History ==
During the 1899 New Women's Movement Initiative (NWMI), social justice feminism became the emphasis of the women's movement. The NWMI was a series of meetings meant to build relationships, trust, and analysis necessary to revitalize US feminism. During these meetings, there was a struggle to agree on whether the women's movement should aspire to be about [women's] rights or social justice. Those who wanted it to be about women's rights feared that a social justice title would ignore the discrimination that women face. This is due to the fact feminism and the beginnings of the women's movement was portrayed as for white middle aged women. Therefore, these white women did not want the movement to be seen as social justice. They did not understand that by viewing it as social justice feminism, it included minorities. Ultimately, the NWMI wanted to regain momentum in the political arena so the women agreed to base the movement on promoting principles of social justice feminism.

Social justice feminism first focused on labor reforms. This included advocating for reduced working hours and better working conditions for women. This turns from protecting women workers to expanding workplace protections for all employees after some time. In the Supreme Court case Muller V. Oregon, the issue of a minimum work was addressed. Muller had required one of his employees at his factory to work beyond the minimum hour work day and as a result was taken to court. Florence Kelly assisted Oregon's attorney, Louis D. Brandeis, in the case and luckily the outcome was in their favor. By a 9-0 vote, the justices upheld the Oregon law. As a response to this case, Kelly and other social justice feminists lobbied for minimum wage laws. Their success consisted of twelve states obtaining such legislation by 1917. An area of gender inequality regarding female labour lies within wages, with women earning 60-75% of mens wages, likely due to breaks (maternity leave) and part time work. Care jobs, which are often performed by women, are underpaid and undermined, which reinforces economic inequality.

== Intersectionality ==
Social justice feminism is built on the fundamentals of intersectionality. Intersectionality is defined as "the theory that the overlap of various social identities, such as race, gender, sexuality, and class, contributes to the specific type of systemic oppression and discrimination experienced by an individual". As an example, one can be discriminated against based on their gender for being a woman, but one can also be discriminated based on their race and gender for being a Latina woman. These layers of oppression intersect with one another, making it harder on them.

In relation to social justice feminism, the movement is about evoking change for all rights, therefore intersectionality must be observed. It allows people to view the different ways men and women can be oppressed, thus calling for action. During the National Women's Movement Initiative, participants were diverse in terms of race, ethnicity, economic status, sexuality, geographic locale and age. There was a strong presence of women of color as well as a cross generational representation of women who became active in the women's movement A more diverse group of people were wanting to participate in the movement but worried about feeling accepted. They questioned whether they were accepted in the movement. Ultimately, these women felt welcome and valued as they shared a similarity with the rest of the women; a desire to "maximize the potential of the movement as a social change agent".

== Social justice feminism today ==
Social justice feminism continues to take place globally in the present day. The Young Women's Freedom Center, based in San Francisco, became the first US non-profit run and led entirely by young women, consisting of cis and trans women who build a movement of formerly incarcerated and system involved young women to transform the systems that keep them living in poverty, stuck in cycles of violence, and incarcerated. Their goal is to change the systems, policies, services, and narratives that ensnare young women of color, poor young women, and queer and transgender young women in cycles of violence, economic marginalization, incarceration, and self destruction.

Sisters Rising is an organization that provides young women that have been in the juvenile system with paid internships. The internships incorporate healing, skills development, political education, community organizing and reintegration into the community. Overall, Sisters Rising provides assistance to young women who struggle to stay out of the criminal justice system to maintain meaningful employment. Another organization that provides social justice is the National Latina Business Women Association-Los Angeles (NLBWA-LA). This organization offers workshops, programs and networking connections to Latinas who are expanding their business. The goal of NLBWA-LA is to support Latina women in the business industry allowing women of color to be more noticeable.

Since the New Women's Movement Initiative in 1899, there have been various waves of feminism that have been tacked onto the movement. Issues that social justice feminists have fought include suffrage, education, representation, equality, sexism, environmental justice, and domestic violence. Although the issues continue to change or become broader, social justice feminists are continuing to fight.
