= New Century Guild =

- U.S. National Register of Historic Places
- U.S. National Historic Landmark
- Pennsylvania state historical marker
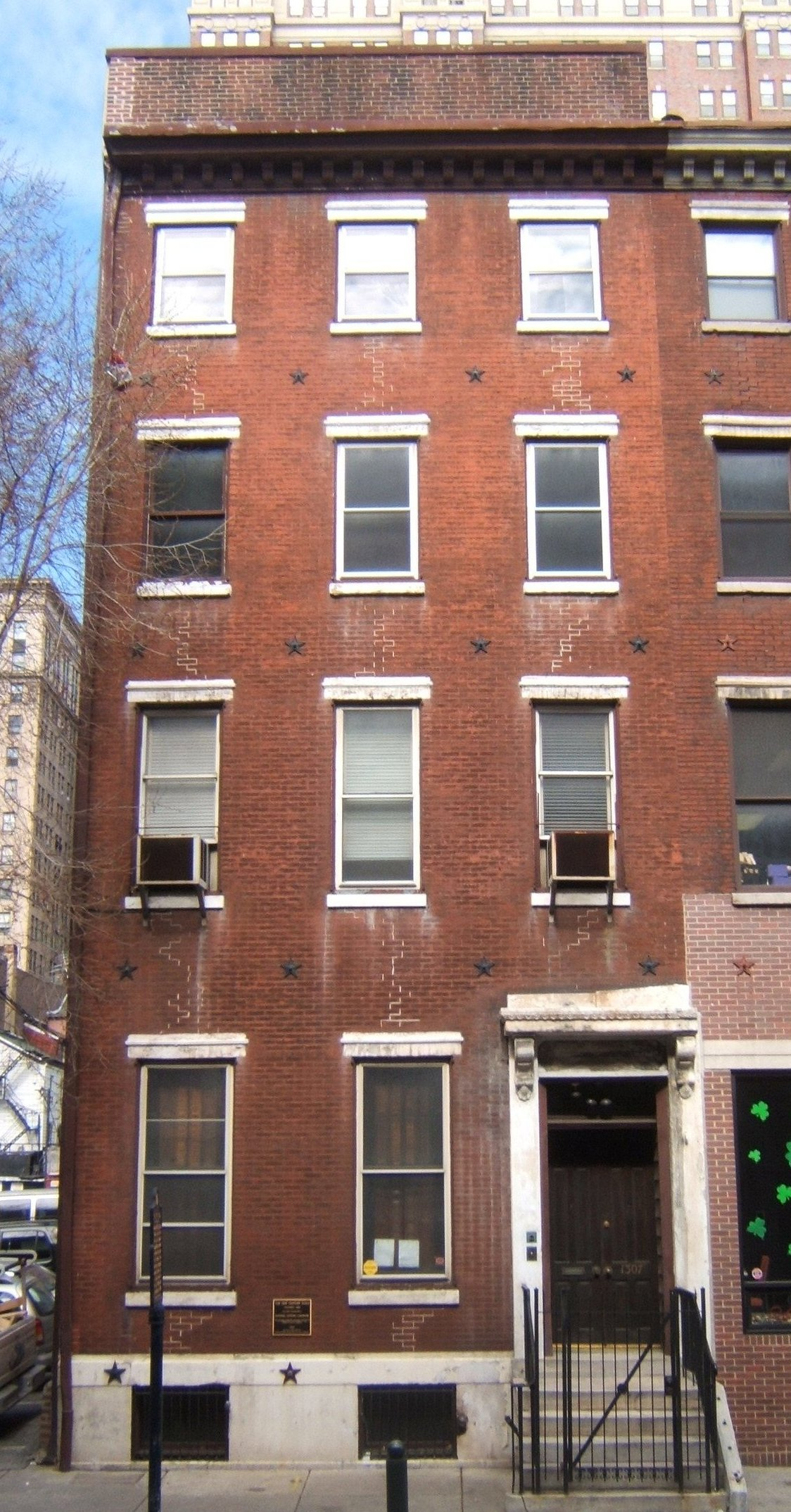
- New Century Guild in March 2009

- Location within Philadelphia Location within Pennsylvania Location within the United States
- Location: 1307 Locust Street, Philadelphia, Pennsylvania
- Coordinates: 39°56′53″N 75°9′46″W
- Architect: Bunting & Shrigley
- Architectural style: Italianate
- NRHP reference No.: 93001611

Significant dates
- Added to NRHP: November 4, 1993
- Designated NHL: November 4, 1993
- Designated PHMC: June 19, 1997

The New Century Guild, now the New Century Trust, is an historic women's support organization which is headquartered in Philadelphia, Pennsylvania. Founded in 1882, it is one of the oldest and largest organizations devoted to meeting the needs of women in the labor force.

From its founding, the organization's goal has been to address the specific needs of "self-supporting women." Its headquarters building at 1307 Locust Street in Center City, Philadelphia is a National Historic Landmark.

== History ==
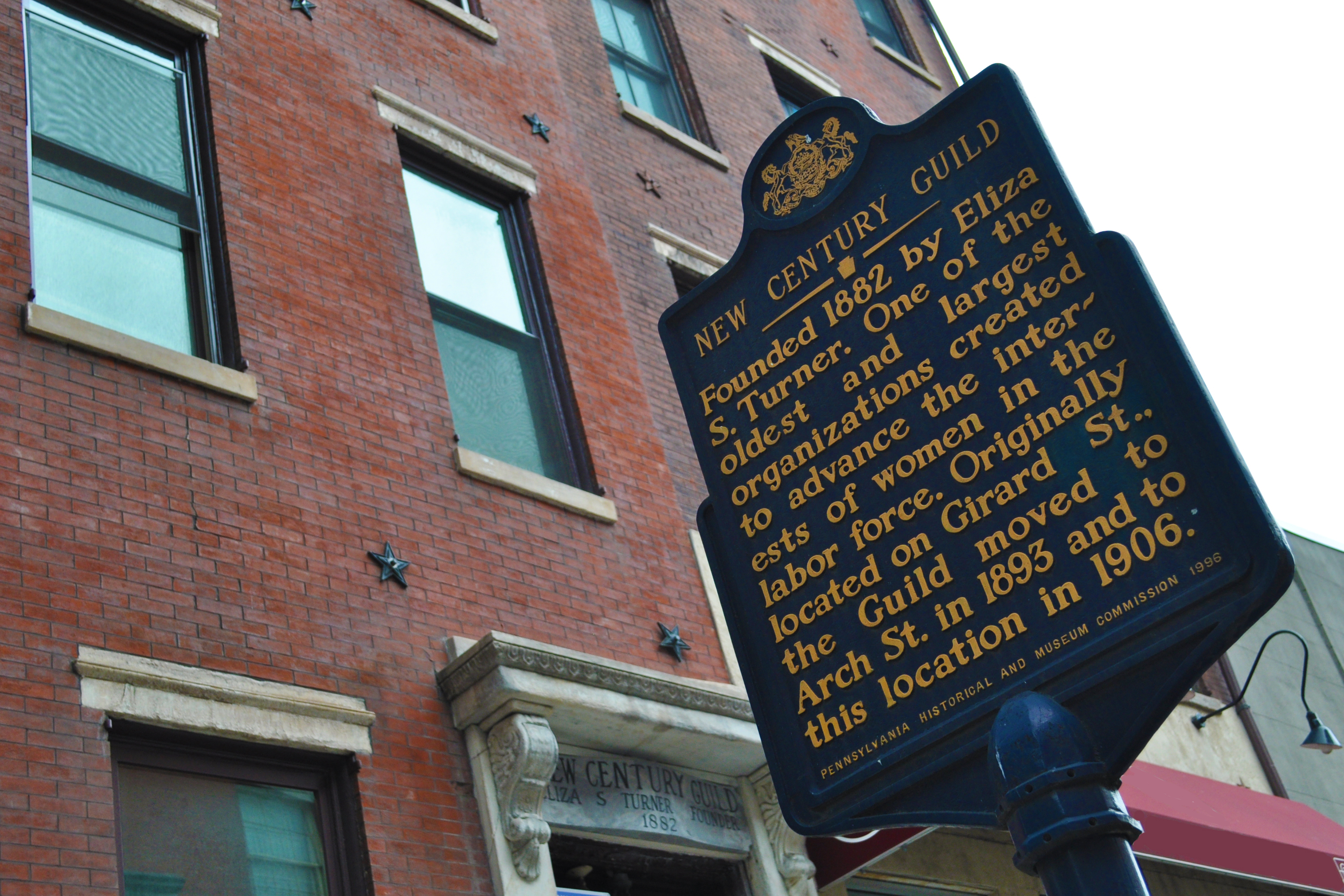
Historical Marker

In 1882, Eliza Sproat Turner and other members of the New Century Club formed a committee for working women named the New Century Guild. It grew out a collection of evening classes for working women that began in 1880. She was assisted by artist Gabrielle D. Clements and Florence Kelley, later known as Florence Wischnevetsky.

Its purpose was to provide education and opportunities for working women to learn a vocation. Soon afterward, the Guild became a separate organization and it needed its own building by 1892 to support programs and classes. The New Century Trust was formed in 1893 to facilitate funding for its first building.

== Historic headquarters ==
The Guild headquarters are in a four-story Italianate brick rowhouse built in 1851. It was purchased by the Guild in 1906 from the estate of Dr. Thomas Drysdale. In addition to housing the offices of the guild, it has a library and meeting spaces available for its membership.

The building was declared a National Historic Landmark in 1993 in recognition of the guild's history.

== See also ==
- List of National Historic Landmarks in Philadelphia
- National Register of Historic Places listings in Center City, Philadelphia
