= Charlotte Jacobs =

Dutch feminist and pharmacist (1847–1916)

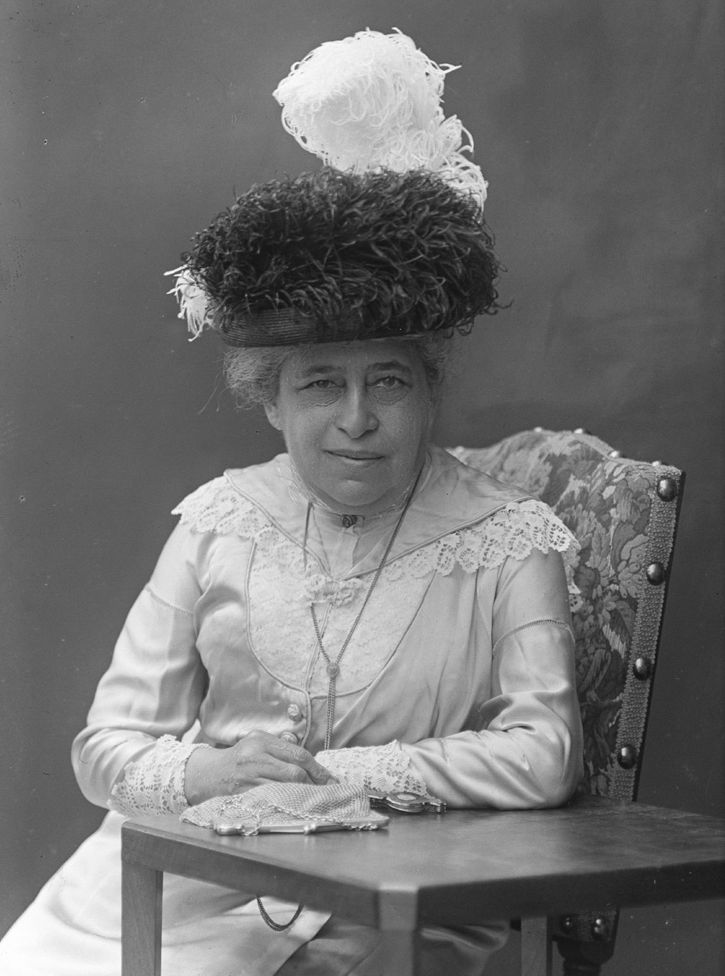
- Charlotte Jacobs in December 1913, photographed by Jacob Merkelbach
- Born: 13 February 1847; Sappemeer
- Died: 31 October 1916 (aged 69); The Hague
- Occupations: Pharmacist, Suffragist

Charlotte Jacobs (13 February 1847, Sappemeer – 31 October 1916, The Hague), was a Dutch feminist and pharmacist. She was the first woman in the Netherlands to graduate with a degree in pharmacology and also active within the women's movement. She was the sister of Aletta Jacobs.

Charlotte Jacobs became the second female university student in the Netherlands when she started her studies in Amsterdam in 1877 and the first female pharmacist in 1879. She was a pharmacist at the Utrecht hospital in 1882–84.

In 1887–1912, she managed her own pharmacy in Batavia in the Dutch East Indies, becoming the first female pharmacist in the Dutch East Indies.

In 1908, she founded the first women's movement "Vereeniging voor Vrouwenkiesrecht" in the Dutch East Indies. She primarily fought for education opportunities for women in the colony, and not only for Dutch women. She returned to the Netherlands in 1912, where she was active within woman suffrage and the peace movement.
