= Apothecary =

Former name for a pharmacist

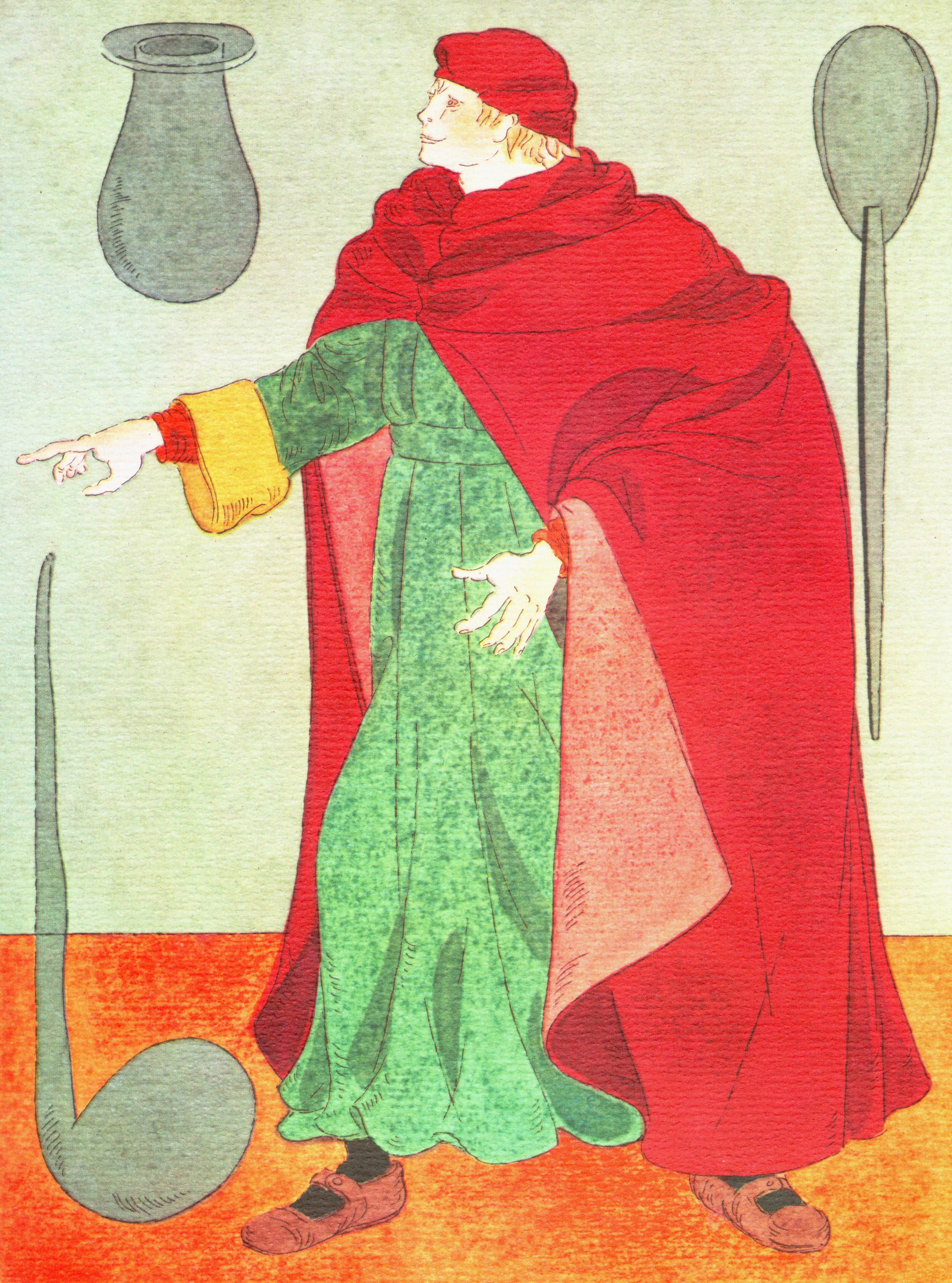
An apothecary in the 15th century

Apothecary (/əˈpɒθəkəri/) is an archaic English term for a medical professional who formulates and dispenses materia medica ('medicine') to physicians, surgeons and patients. The modern terms pharmacist and, in British English, chemist have taken over this role.

In some languages and regions, terms similar to "apothecary" have survived and denote modern pharmacies or pharmacists.

Apothecaries' investigation of herbal and chemical ingredients was a precursor to the modern sciences of chemistry and pharmacology.

In addition to dispensing herbs and medicine, apothecaries offered general medical advice and a range of services that are now performed by other specialist practitioners, such as surgeons and obstetricians. Apothecary shops sold ingredients and the medicines they prepared wholesale to other medical practitioners, as well as dispensing them to patients. In 17th-century England, they also controlled the trade in tobacco, which was imported as a medicine.

== Etymology ==
The term "apothecary" derives from the Ancient Greek ἀποθήκη (apothḗkē, "a repository, storehouse") via Latin apotheca ("repository, storehouse, warehouse", cf. bodega and boutique), Medieval Latin apothecarius ("storekeeper"), and eventually Old French apotecaire.

In some European and other languages, the term is current and used to designate a pharmacist/chemist, such as Dutch and German Apotheker, Hungarian patikus, Irish poitigéir, Latvian aptiekārs and Luxembourgish Apdikter. Likewise, "pharmacy" translates as apotek in Danish, Norwegian and Swedish, apteekki in Finnish, apoteka in Bosnian, patika in Hungarian, aptieka in Latvian, апотека (apoteka) in Serbian, аптека (apteka) in Russian, Bulgarian, Macedonian and Ukrainian, Apotheke in German and apteka in Polish. The word in Indonesian is apoteker. In Yiddish the word is אַפּטייק apteyk.

Use of the term in the names of businesses varies with time and location. It is generally an Americanism, though some areas of the United States use it to invoke an experience of nostalgic revival and it has been used for a wide variety of businesses; while in other areas such as California its use is restricted to licensed pharmacies.

== History ==
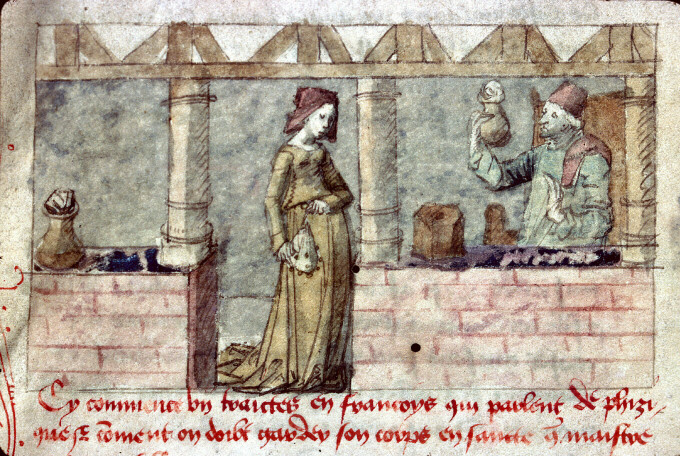
A 15th-century French apothecary (at right)

In Exodus 30:25 of the Hebrew Bible, a practice similar to apothecary is mentioned. The profession of apothecary can be dated back at least to 2600 BC to ancient Babylon, which provides one of the earliest records of the practice of the apothecary. Clay tablets have been found with medical texts recording symptoms, prescriptions, and directions for compounding.

The Papyrus Ebers from ancient Egypt, written c. 1500 BC, contains a collection of more than 800 prescriptions with over 700 drugs.

In ancient India, the Sushruta Samhita, a compendium on the practice of medicine and medical formulations, has been traced back to the 1st century BC.

The Shennong Ben Cao Jing, a Chinese book on agriculture and medicinal plants (3rd century AD), is considered a foundational material for Chinese medicine and herbalism and became an important source for Chinese apothecaries. The book, which documented 365 treatments, had a focus on roots and grass. It had treatments which came from minerals, roots, grass, and animals. Many of the mentioned drugs and their uses are still followed today. Ginseng's use as a sexual stimulant and aid for erectile dysfunction stems from this book. Ma huang, an herb first mentioned in the book, led to the introduction of the drug ephedrine into modern medicine.

According to Sharif Kaf al-Ghazal and S. Hadzovic, apothecary shops existed during the Middle Ages in Baghdad, operated by pharmacists in 754 during the Abbasid Caliphate and Islamic Golden Age. Apothecaries were also active in Al-Andalus by the 11th century.

By the end of the 14th century, Geoffrey Chaucer (c. 1342–1400) was mentioning an English apothecary in the Canterbury Tales, specifically "The Nun's Priest's Tale", as Pertelote speaks to Chauntecleer (lines 181–184):

... and for ye shal nat tarie,

Though in this toun is noon apothecarie,
I shal myself to herbes techen yow,
That shul been for youre hele and for youre prow.

In modern English:

... and you should not linger,
Though in this town there is no apothecary,
I shall teach you about herbs myself,
That will be for your health and for your pride.

During the Italian Renaissance, Italian nuns became a prominent source for medicinal needs. At first, they used their knowledge of non-curative uses in the convents to reinforce the sanctity of religion among their sisters. As they progressed in skill, they began to expand their field to generate profit. This profit they used towards their charitable goals. Because of their eventual spread to urban society, these religious women gained roles of public significance beyond the spiritual realm, writes S.T. Strocchia. Later, apothecaries led by nuns spread across the Italian peninsula.

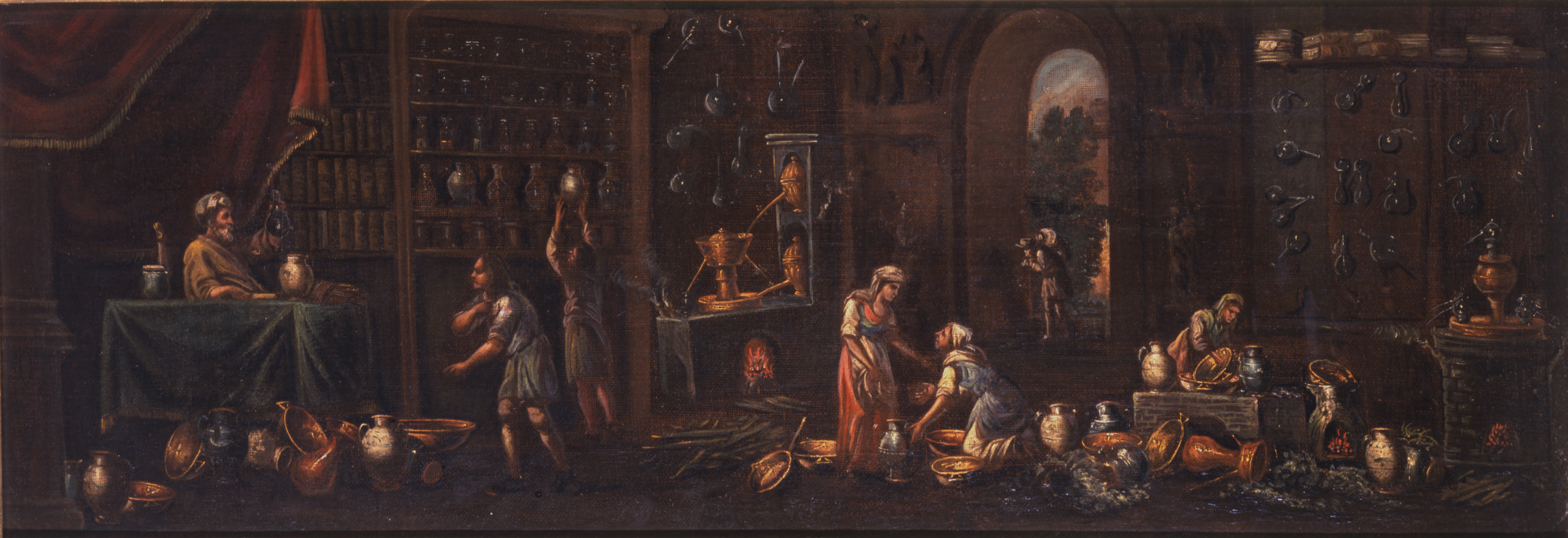
Early Italian pharmacy, 17th century. Gift of Fisher Scientific International, Science History Institute, Philadelphia.

From the 15th century to the 16th century, the apothecary gained the status of a skilled practitioner. In London, the apothecaries merited their own livery company, the Worshipful Society of Apothecaries, founded in 1617. Its roots, however, go back much earlier to the Guild of Pepperers formed in London in 1180. Similarly in Ireland, apothecaries were organized before 1446. In Ireland and Great Britain, they were allowed to diagnose diseases in addition to their compounding and dispensing roles, becoming regulated general medical practitioners and the forerunners of general practitioners there.

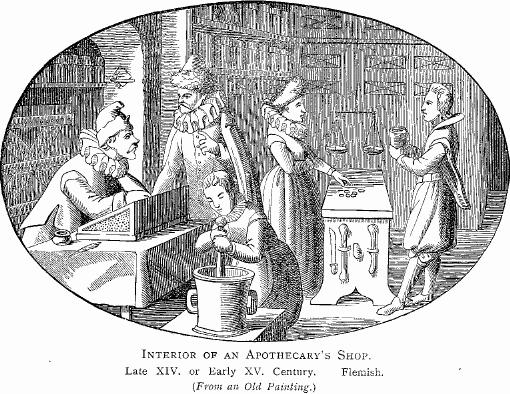
Interior of an apothecary's shop. Illustration from Illustrated History of Furniture, From the Earliest to the Present Time from 1893 by Frederick Litchfield (1850–1930).

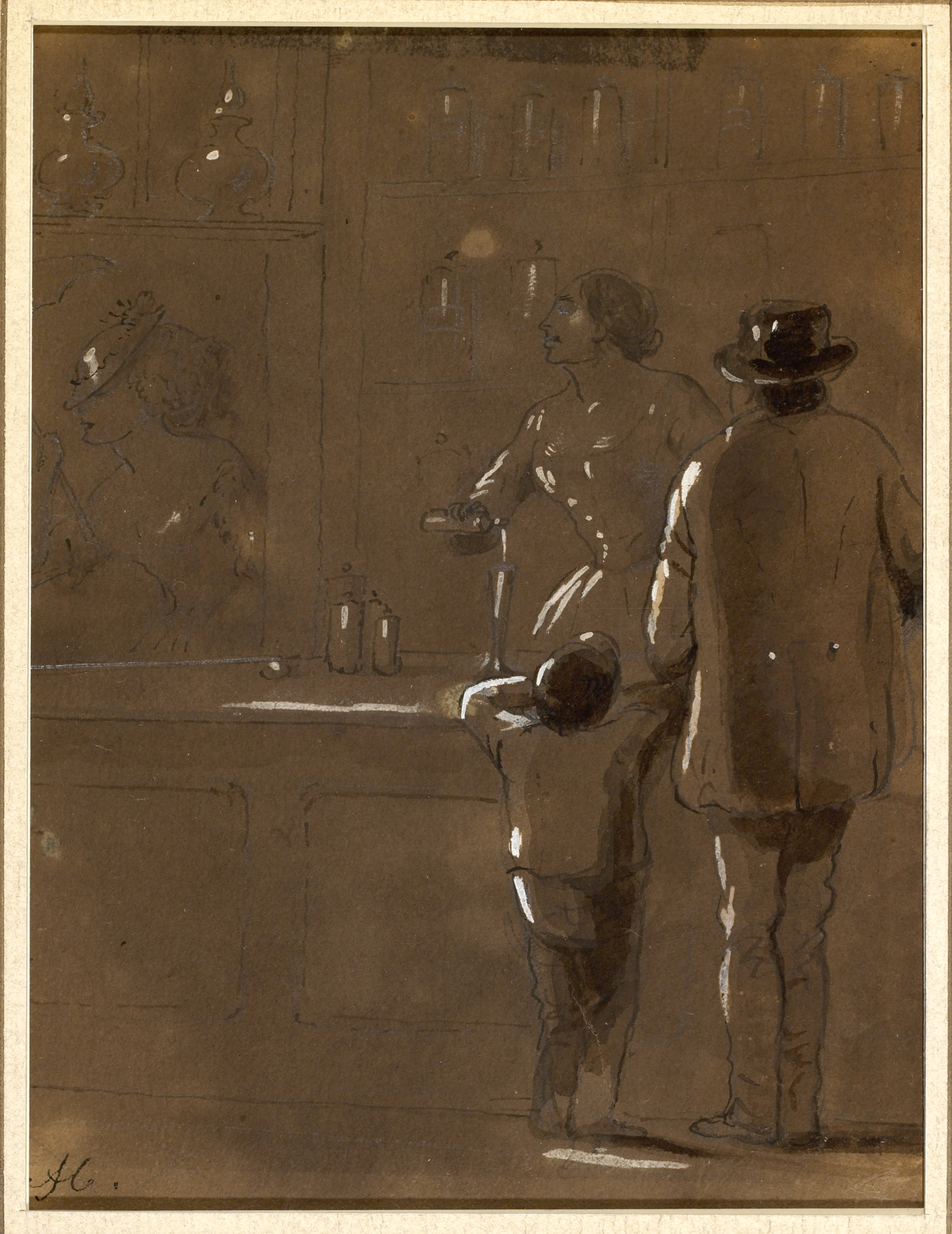
The Lady Apothecary, by Alfred Jacob Miller (between 1825 and 1870). Walters Art Museum, Baltimore.

However, there were ongoing tensions between apothecaries and other medical professions, as is illustrated by the publication of A Short View of the Frauds and Abuses Committed by Apothecaries by the physician Christopher Merret in 1669 and the experiences of Susan Reeve Lyon and other female apothecaries in 17th century London. Oftentimes, women, who were prohibited from entering medical school, became apothecaries, taking away business from male physicians. In 1865, Elizabeth Garrett Anderson was the first woman to be licensed to practice medicine in Britain by passing the examination of the Society of Apothecaries. By the end of the 19th century, the medical professions had taken on their current institutional form, with defined roles for physicians and surgeons, and the role of the apothecary was more narrowly conceived, as that of pharmacist or chemist.

In German-speaking countries, such as Germany, Austria, and Switzerland, pharmacies or chemist stores are still called apothecaries or, in German, Apotheken. The Apotheke ('store') is legally obligated to be run at all times by at least one Apotheker (male) or Apothekerin (female), who actually has an academic degree as a pharmacist—in German, Pharmazeut (male) or Pharmazeutin (female)—and has obtained the professional title Apotheker by either working in the field for numerous years, usually by working in a pharmacy store, or taking additional exams. Thus, a Pharmazeut is not always an Apotheker. Magdalena Neff became the first woman to gain a medical qualification in Germany when she studied pharmacy at the Karlsruhe Institute of Technology and later passed the apothecary's examination in 1906.

Apothecaries used their own measurement system, the apothecaries' system, to provide precise weighing of small quantities. Apothecaries dispensed vials of poisons as well as medicines, and as is still the case, medicines could be either beneficial or harmful if inappropriately used. Protective methods to prevent accidental ingestion of poisons included the use of specially-shaped containers for potentially poisonous substances such as laudanum.

=== Apothecary work as gateway to women as healers ===
Apothecary businesses were typically family-run, and wives or other women of the family worked alongside their husbands in the shops, learning the trade themselves. Women were still not allowed to train or be educated in universities, so this allowed them a chance to learn medical knowledge and healing practices. Previously, women had some influence over other women's healthcare, such as serving as midwives and providing other feminine care in settings not considered appropriate for males. Though physicians gave medical advice, they did not make medicine, so they typically sent their patients to particular independent apothecaries, who also provided some medical advice, in particular remedies and healing.

== Methods ==
=== Recipes ===
Many recipes for medicines included herbs, minerals, and animal matter (meats, fats, skins) that were ingested, made into paste for external use, or used in aromatherapy. Some of these are similar to natural remedies used today, including catnip, chamomile, fennel, mint, garlic, and witch hazel. Many other ingredients used in the past, such as urine, fecal matter, earwax, human fat, and saliva, are no longer used and are generally considered ineffective or insanitary. Trial and error was the main method of finding successful remedies, as little was known about the chemistry of why certain treatments worked. For instance, it was known that drinking coffee could help cure headaches, but the existence and properties of caffeine itself was still a mystery.

== Noted apothecaries ==
- Hildegard of Bingen
- Paracelsus
- Dante Alighieri
- James Parkinson
- Silvanus Bevan
- Hendrik Claudius
- Émile Coué
- Nicholas Culpeper
- John Keats
- Nostradamus
- John Parkinson
- Joseph Proust
- Nicholas Hughes
- Shen Nung
- Fanny Allen
- Tomé Pires
- Benedict Arnold
- Maomao

== See also ==
- Alchemy
- Compounding
- Herb garden
- Herbalism
  - Traditional Chinese medicine
- History of pharmacy
- Pharmacist
- Theriac
- Worshipful Society of Apothecaries
- Apothecaries' Hall of Ireland
