= Magdalena Neff =

German pharmacist

Magdalena Neff (1881–1966), was a German pharmacist. She was the first woman in Germany to become a formally educated pharmacist, completing her studies at TH Karlsruhe in 1906.
