= Ella P. Stewart =

American pharmacist (1893–1987)

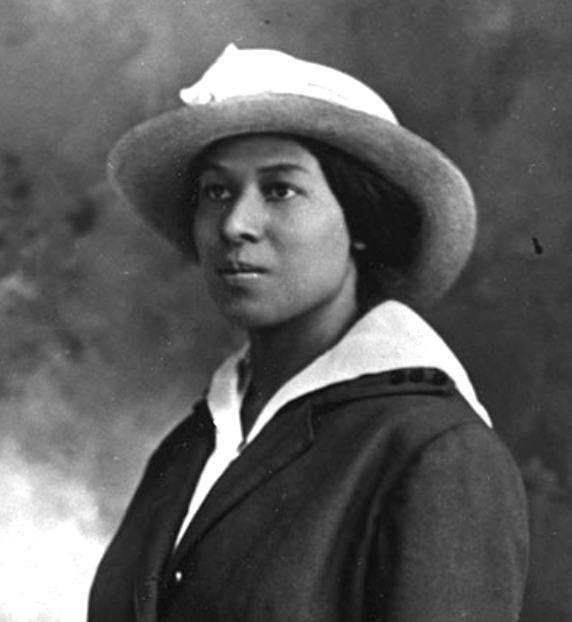
- Stewart, c. 1920
- Born: Ella Nora Phillips; March 6, 1893; Stringtown, Clark County, Virginia, U.S.
- Died: November 27, 1987 (aged 94); Toledo, Ohio
- Other names: Ella P. Stewart; Ella Nora Phillips Stewart
- Education: University of Pittsburgh (Ph.C.)
- Occupation: Pharmacist
- Employer: Stewarts Pharmacy (1922-1945)
- Known for: One of the first Black pharmacists in the United States
- Spouse(s): Charles Myers (div.); William Wyatt "Doc" Stewart (m. 1920-1976, dec.)
- Awards: Ohio Women's Hall of Fame

Ella P. Stewart (née Ella Nora Phillips; March 6, 1893 – November 27, 1987) was an American pharmacist who was one of the first African American female pharmacists in the United States.

== Early life and education ==
Stewart was born Ella Nora Phillips, in Stringtown, a small village near Berryville, in Clark County, Virginia, the oldest of the four children of Henry H. Philips and Eliza T. (Carr) Phillips. Her parents were sharecroppers. When she was six years old she was sent to live with her paternal grandmother in Berryville, to attend grade school. An outstanding student, she graduated at the top of her grade school class, and won several major scholarships to what was then the Storer Normal School (later, Storer College), in nearby Harpers Ferry, West Virginia; she entered Storer at the age of 12.

Stewart withdrew from the teacher training program at Storer in order to marry Charles Myers, who was a classmate there. The couple moved to Pittsburgh, Pennsylvania. After their only child, Virginia, died of whooping cough at the age of three, they divorced.

In Pittsburgh, Stewart began working in a local pharmacy as a bookkeeper, and her job sparked in her an interest in becoming a pharmacist. Despite the challenges she faced both as a woman and as an African American, she gained admittance to the University of Pittsburgh School of Pharmacy in 1914. She completed her degree in pharmaceutical chemistry (Ph.C.) in 1916, becoming the first black woman to graduate from Pitt's pharmacy program. In the same year, Stewart passed the state examination becoming the first African American female pharmacist in the state of Pennsylvania and one of the first African American female pharmacists in the country.

== Career ==
Stewart initially worked as an assistant pharmacist for the Mendelsson Drug Company, owned by two classmates from the University of Pittsburgh. She later went on to own and operate a drugstore at the General Hospital in Braddock, Pennsylvania. In 1918 she moved back to Pittsburgh, where she again established her own business, Myers Pharmacy.

On May 1, 1920, she married William Wyatt "Doc" Stewart, a fellow pharmacist in Pittsburgh, and a fellow alumnus of the Pitt pharmacy program. The couple settled in Youngstown, Ohio, where, Ella Stewart was hired as a pharmacist at the Youngstown City Hospital. After some time, she and her husband moved to Detroit, where they stayed for a short period, and then to Toledo, Ohio.

In 1922, Ella Stewart and her husband, William, opened Stewarts' Pharmacy, the first Black-owned pharmacy in Toledo. Stewarts' Pharmacy was located at 566 Indiana Avenue, at the corner of Indiana and City Park NW, and initially had a mostly white customer base. The Stewarts owned the 566 Indiana Avenue building and lived above the pharmacy in an eight room residence in Toledo's Pinewood district, where two-thirds of the city's African Americans lived. Stewarts Pharmacy was a popular neighborhood gathering place, and the Stewarts regularly entertained visitors, including Marian Anderson, Mary McLeod Bethune, E. Simms Campbell, General Benjamin O. Davis Jr., W. E. B. Du Bois, and Paul Robeson, Rayford Logan, and Carter G. Woodson.

In 1945, the Stewarts sold the pharmacy.

== Civic activities ==
By the 1930s Stewart became a leading member of community groups in Toledo, including the Young Women's Christian Association (YWCA) and the Enterprise Charity Club, a social-service organization run by African-American women. From 1944 to 1948 she served as president of the Ohio Association of Colored Women; and from 1948 to 1952, as the 14th president of the National Association of Colored Women's Clubs (NACWC), succeeding Christine Shoecraft Smith. As leader of the NACWC, Stewart spoke out against segregation, discrimination, and racist stereotypes. In 1961 she became an inaugural member of the Toledo Board of Community Relations, which worked to improve race relations in the city, and to ensure enforcement of civil-rights legislation.

Stewart's civic activities eventually took on an international dimension: in 1952 she was appointed as an American delegate to the International Conference of Women of the World, held in Athens, Greece. She subsequently spent time during the 1950s touring as a goodwill ambassador for the United States; in 1954 one such U.S. State Department tour took her to several nations in Southeast Asia, including India, Indonesia, Pakistan, and Sri Lanka. In 1963 she was appointed to the United States commission of the United Nations Educational, Scientific and Cultural Organization (UNESCO), and in her role, she travelled around the world as a US goodwill ambassador.

Stewart spent the rest of her life in Toledo, remaining active as a volunteer and philanthropist.

== Personal ==
Ella Stewart's husband, William Stewart, died in 1976 at the age of 83. She moved into a retirement home a few years later, in 1980. She died in 1987, at the age of 94.

== Legacy ==
Ella Nora Phillips Stewart is known not only for becoming one of the first African American female pharmacists but also for her struggles against discrimination and her impact in the community. The Ella P. Stewart Scrapbooks are housed at Bowling Green State University.

Selected awards and honors

- 1961: A new school in Toledo was named in her honor, the Ella P. Stewart Elementary School (later: Ella P. Stewart Academy for Girls). In subsequent years Stewart volunteered there regularly. In 1974 the school created a museum to house Stewart's plaques and awards, and memorabilia she collected on her international tours.
- 1969: Named to the roster of Distinguished Alumni of the University of Pittsburgh School of Pharmacy
- 1974: Honorary doctorate, University of Toledo
- 1978: Inducted into the Ohio Women's Hall of Fame
- 1999: Inaugural inductee, posthumously, Toledo Civic Hall of Fame
- 2023: Conference room at the University of Pittsburgh School of Pharmacy named in her honor.
