= Olimpia Altuve =

First Central-American woman to get a university degree

Olimpia Altuve (October 13, 1892, in Quetzaltenango, Guatemala – 1987) was the first Central American woman to obtain a university degree, obtaining her degree in Pharmaceutical Chemistry in 1919.

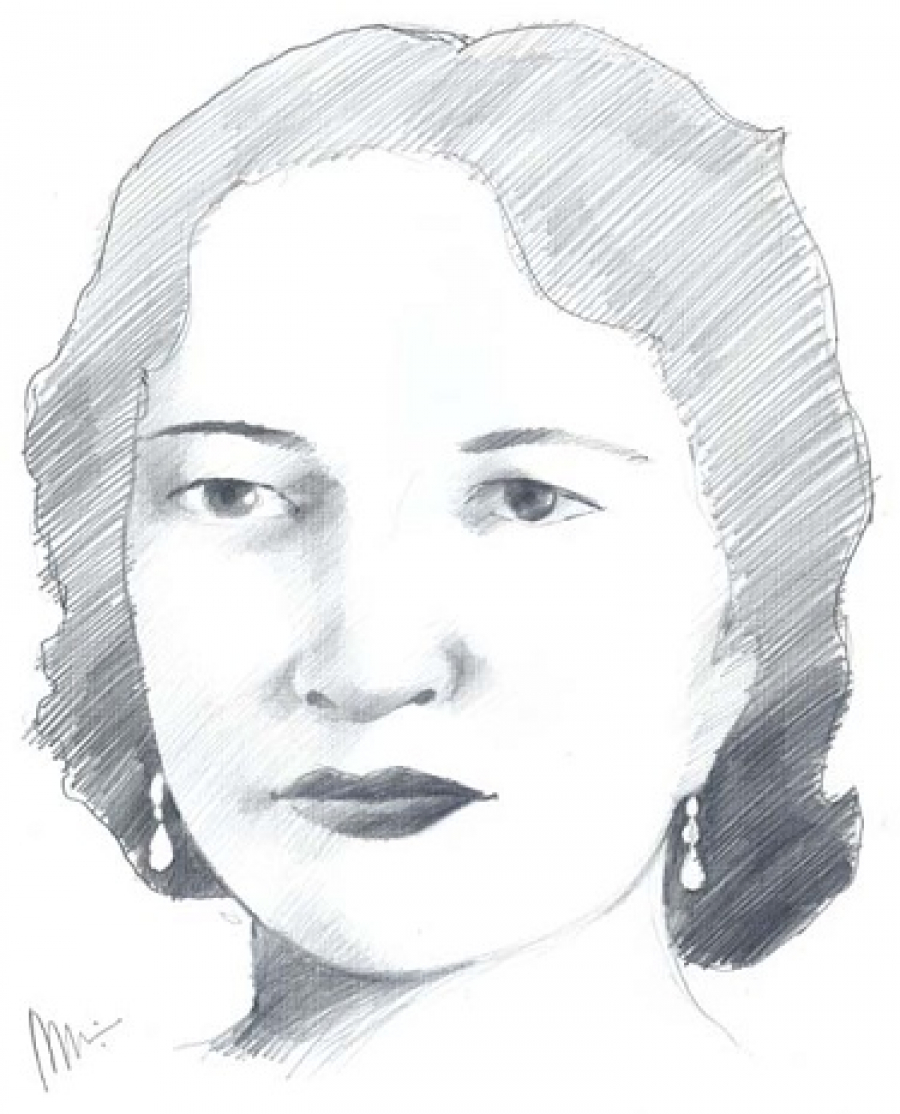
Portrait of Olimpia Altuve, by Mauro Osorio.

She graduated from the Instituto Normal para Señoritas de Occidente with a highschool diploma in Science and Arts and as a Primary Education Teacher. She then began studying at Universidad de San Carlos de Guatemala (back then still called Universidad Nacional Estrada Cabrera). She completed her studies in the Faculty of Medicine and Pharmacy, earning her degree in Pharmaceutical Chemistry on the 23rd of November 1919, with her dissertation titled: «Contribution to the study of Cecropia mexicana (Guarumo)».

In the year of Altuve's graduation, the citizen rights of women were still not recognized in Guatemala, and she was not allowed to wear the toga. It was not until 1967, in a ceremony held in the Hall of Honor of the Faculty of Juridical and Social Sciences, that Altuve was conferred the title of Biological Chemist and had the right to wear the university gown. In this act, she expressed:

«It is true that there was a firm decision on my part to recognize the difficult path, to launch myself with a spirit of victory to an endeavor that in those times involved attacking, without fear or misgivings, against deep-rooted prejudices and notorious selfishness. I have to be honest with myself, to understand that a chance of destiny, and not any other circumstance or merit, placed me in the privileged situation of having been the first female university professional in Central America»

== Olimpia Altuve Medal ==
In 2019 the Colegio de Farmacéuticos y Químicos de Guatemala (the Professional College of Pharmaceutics and Chemists of Guatemala) created the Olimpia Altuve Medal in honor of Altuve's 100th anniversary of graduation. The medal aims to recognize, on a yearly basis, professional women members of this collegiate body.

Awardees
Name	Profession	Year
Hada Alvarado	Pharmaceutical Chemist	2019
Michele Monroy	Nutritionist	2020
