= Maria Dauerer =

Swedish pharmacist (apothecary)

Maria Dauerer (1624-1688) was a Swedish pharmacist (apothecary). She was the first known woman apothecary in Sweden.

She was the daughter of the city councillor of Gothenburg Timon van Schoting and Clara du Rées, and married in 1646 the apothecary Georg Christian Dauerer (1618-1664), who in the same year acquired the Markattan pharmacy in Stockholm. During the last years of her husband's life she managed the pharmacy as he was bedridden and ill, and upon his death she inherited the pharmacy and work license in accordance with existing guild regulations. She managed the pharmacy until 1682, when she retired in favor of her son-in-law Jakob Leonard Allmacher (1652–1724).

In the 17th century, the only women pharmacists were widows who inherited their license from their late husbands. This privilege was abolished in 1873, after which all pharmacists were to be formally trained as such, an education which was opened to women in 1891, the first graduate being Märtha Leth.
