= Elizabeth Marshall (pharmacist) =

American entrepreneur and pharmacist

- Born: January 28, 1768; Philadelphia
- Died: July 26, 1836 (aged 68)
- Occupations: Pharmacist, entrepreneur

Elizabeth Marshall (January 28, 1768 – July 26, 1836) was an American entrepreneur who became the second female pharmacist in the United States.

== Early life ==
Marshall was born at 56 Chestnut Street (old number) on January 28, 1768.

== Family ==
Marshall was the eldest daughter of Charles Marshall (1744–1825), the proprietor of a pharmacy in Philadelphia and the first president of Philadelphia College of Apothecaries. She had two brothers and seven sisters. Her mother, Patience (Parrish) Marshall, changed her name to "Patience" from "Ann" after her aunt Patience Howell. Patience Marshall died in February 1834. Her grandmother was Sarah Thomson. Her grandfather was Christopher Marshall (d. 1797), an American revolutionary and founder of the family's pharmacy which was named Marshall Drug Store. Her grandfather thought highly of her, as shown in unpublished diary entries preserved in the Historical Society of Pennsylvania.

== Career ==
Marshall worked as an apprentice in the family pharmacy from 1805. She inherited her grandfather's pharmacy, Marshall Drug Store, in 1804 and managed the business until 1825. Marshall is regarded by some as being the first female pharmacist in the United States, though Elizabeth Gooking Greenleaf was the first in 1727. Marshall ran the pharmacy for two decades. She was able to bring the shop out of bankruptcy and her efforts resulted in the pharmacy's financial success during that period. Marshall retired shortly after the death of her father in 1825 and passed her business on to her apprentices, Charles Ellis and Isaac P. Morris.

The family's pharmacy is the subject of the painting The Marshall Apothecary by Robert Thom. The painting can be found in the series "Great Moments in Pharmacy."

== Death and commemoration ==
Marshall died on July 26, 1836. She was pictured on the wall of the American Pharmacists Association 2012 Women in Pharmacy Exhibit.
