= New Century Club (Philadelphia) =

Women's club in Philadelphia, Pennsylvania

Coordinates: 39.9494°N 75.1606°W

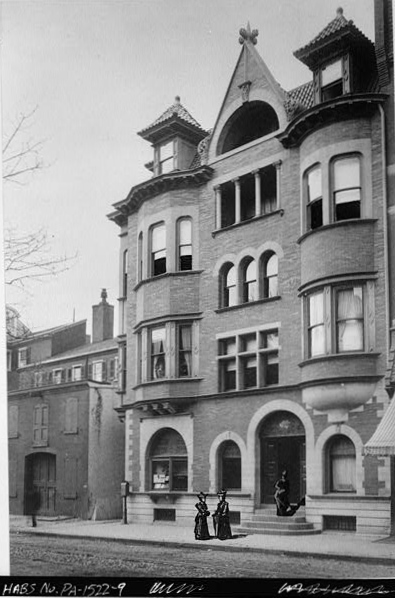
New Century Club, Philadelphia

The New Century Club of Philadelphia, Pennsylvania was founded in 1877. It was one of the first women's clubs in the United States, and included professional women as well as women active in women's rights and the abolition movement.

== History ==
=== Purpose ===
In 1876 the Centennial Exposition was held in Philadelphia and had a Women's Pavilion, which was the springboard for the creation of the New Century Club in January 1877. In 1879 it was incorporated, one of the nine incorporators was Emily Sartain.

One of the first women's clubs in the United States, its purpose was to provide a meeting place for its members and to promote "science, literature and art." The club, described as a "centre of thought and action among women" in its constitution, initially offered programs to help educate and aid working women and to address municipal concerns, and later into social reform. It focused on issues affected women and children – like child labor laws, education, and legal defense – and other civic and cultural issues. Committees in 1894 included Club Organization, Education, Study, Library, Reception, Entertainment, Working Woman's Guild, Public Interests, Legal Protection of Working Women, and the Browning Society. Although the club avoided public controversy by downplaying involvement in "radical" causes such as the suffrage movement, its members were active in a wide range of reforms.

The New Century Club was declared in Philadelphia's Cultural Landscape: The Sartain Family Legacy (2000) to be "an influential early manifestation of the woman's club movement that swept through the country at the turn of the century. This movement brought thousands into associations where they met other ambitious, energetic women, developed organizational and leadership skills, and articulated a belief in social welfare and urban improvement that anticipated much Progressive Era social reform." It served as a support for professional women until individual, profession based organizations for women, such as The Plastic Club for artists and the Women's Homeopathic Medical Club, were founded starting in the 1890s.

=== Membership ===
The club founders included professional women and women who had been active in women's rights and the abolition movement. One of the founders was Sarah Catherine Fraley Hallowell, a journalist with the Philadelphia Ledger, was the club's first president. Other founding members were Elizabeth Croasdale and Emily Sartain, who were pass and contemporary school principals at the Philadelphia School of Design for Women; writer Eliza Sproat Turner; veteran campaigner Mary Grew and physician and later dean of Woman's Medical College of Pennsylvania, Clara Marshall. Turner became the club's third president. Initially there were 40 members and by 1879 there were 120 members and the club was located on Girard Street in Philadelphia.

=== New Century Guild ===
In 1882, Eliza Sproat Turner and other members formed a committee for working women named the New Century Guild. Its purpose was to provide education and opportunities for working women to learn a vocation. Soon after the Guild became a separate organization and it needed its own building by 1892 to support programs and classes. The New Century Trust was formed in 1893 to facilitate funding for its first building.

=== Locations ===
The club moved to a larger place at 1520 Chestnut Street in the Baker Building for the 400 member organization and began plans for an even larger place at 124 Twelfth Street. Architect Minerva Parker Nichols designed a club house of Italian Renaissance architecture, of Indiana limestone and Pompeiian brick at and estimated cost of $80,000. The building had parlors, committee rooms, a library, and a six hundred person capacity drawing room. Gabrielle D. Clements created murals symbolizing Charity, Labor, Science and Art. The effort was led by the club's president, Mrs. Henry C. Townsend.
