= Märtha Leth =

Swedish pharmacist

- Born: 1877
- Died: 1953 (aged 75–76)
- Education: Pharmaceutic Institute in Stockholm
- Occupation: Pharmacist
- Spouse: Johan Eric Hallbergsson
- Children: Five

Märtha Leth (1877–1953) was a Swedish pharmacist and the first woman in Sweden to graduate as a pharmacist, which she did from the Pharmaceutic Institute in Stockholm in 1897.

== Life and work ==
Märtha Leth was born 5 November 1877 in Jämshögs parish, Blekinge, Sweden, as the daughter of the pharmacist Fredrik Leth, who was the owner of Karlshamn's pharmacy. At the age of 11, she enrolled at Lund's higher education for girls. In 1893, she began the required three-year period as a pharmacy student, first for a year and a half at the Fläkta Örn pharmacy in Malmö and then for a year and a half at her father's pharmacy in Karlshamn. After the period as a pharmacy student, Leth completed six months of study at the Pharmaceutical Institute in order to be able to take the pharmacy exam, which she took on 21 January 1897. She was the first woman to take this degree, which was the lower pharmaceutical degree.

To begin the two-year education that led to the pharmacy degree, the higher pharmaceutical degree, required that Leth undertake another year of internship. Leth began her internship at her father's pharmacy.

In the decades before Leth completed her degree, the widows of the apothecaries had been allowed to inherit the license of their late husbands (the first to do so was likely Maria Dauerer), but this was banned in 1873 when a personal license and a qualified education were first demanded. An official pharmaceutical education was first opened to women in 1891.

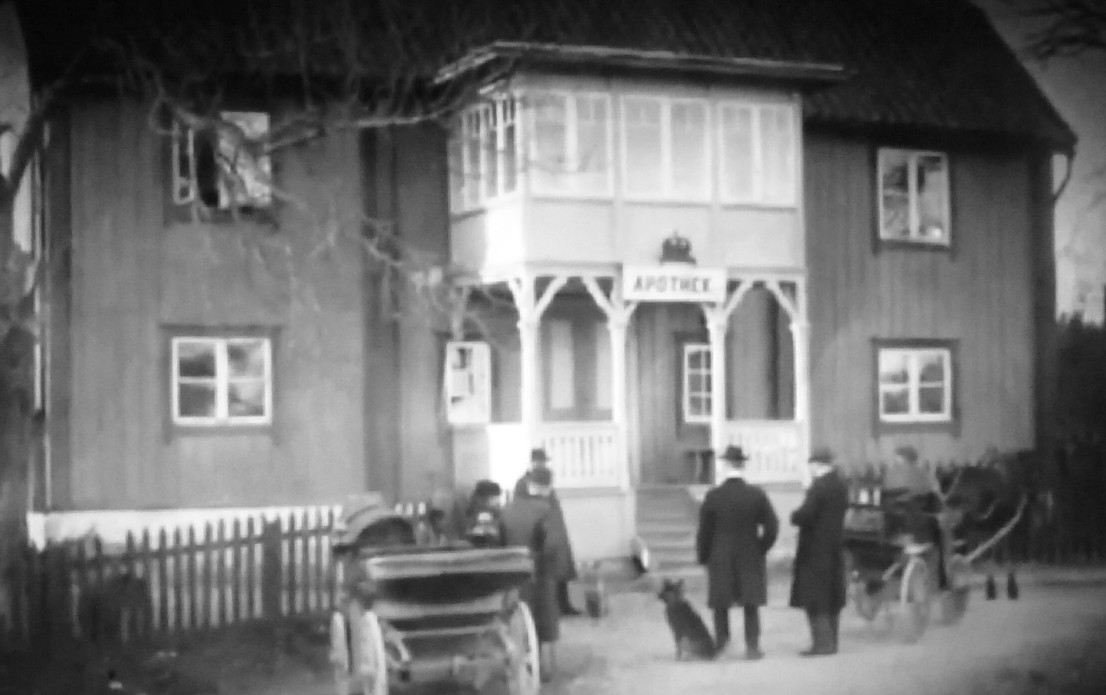
Hammarby pharmacy, 1913

Märtha Leth married the pharmacist Johan Eric Hallbergsson and they had five children, born between 1901 and 1912.

Hallbergsson was murdered on the evening of 1 December 1913 at the Hammarby pharmacy in Upplands Väsby during a mysterious, still unsolved, case known as the "notorious Hammarby murder." The newspaper Svensk Farmaci published an article about the murder as well as the two pharmacists, Märtha and Johan Hallbergsson who lived above the pharmacy with their children and maid. The murder case "received a lot of attention in the newspapers, and a fundraiser was launched among pharmacists to support the survivors."

Leth later moved to Norrköping, where she worked as a pharmacist and for many years. She died on 23 September 1953.
