= Hallowell family =

The Hallowell family is an American family from Philadelphia and Boston, notable for their activism in the abolitionist movement and for their philanthropy to various universities and civil rights organizations. The Hallowell family is frequently associated with Boston Brahmins.

== Notable members ==
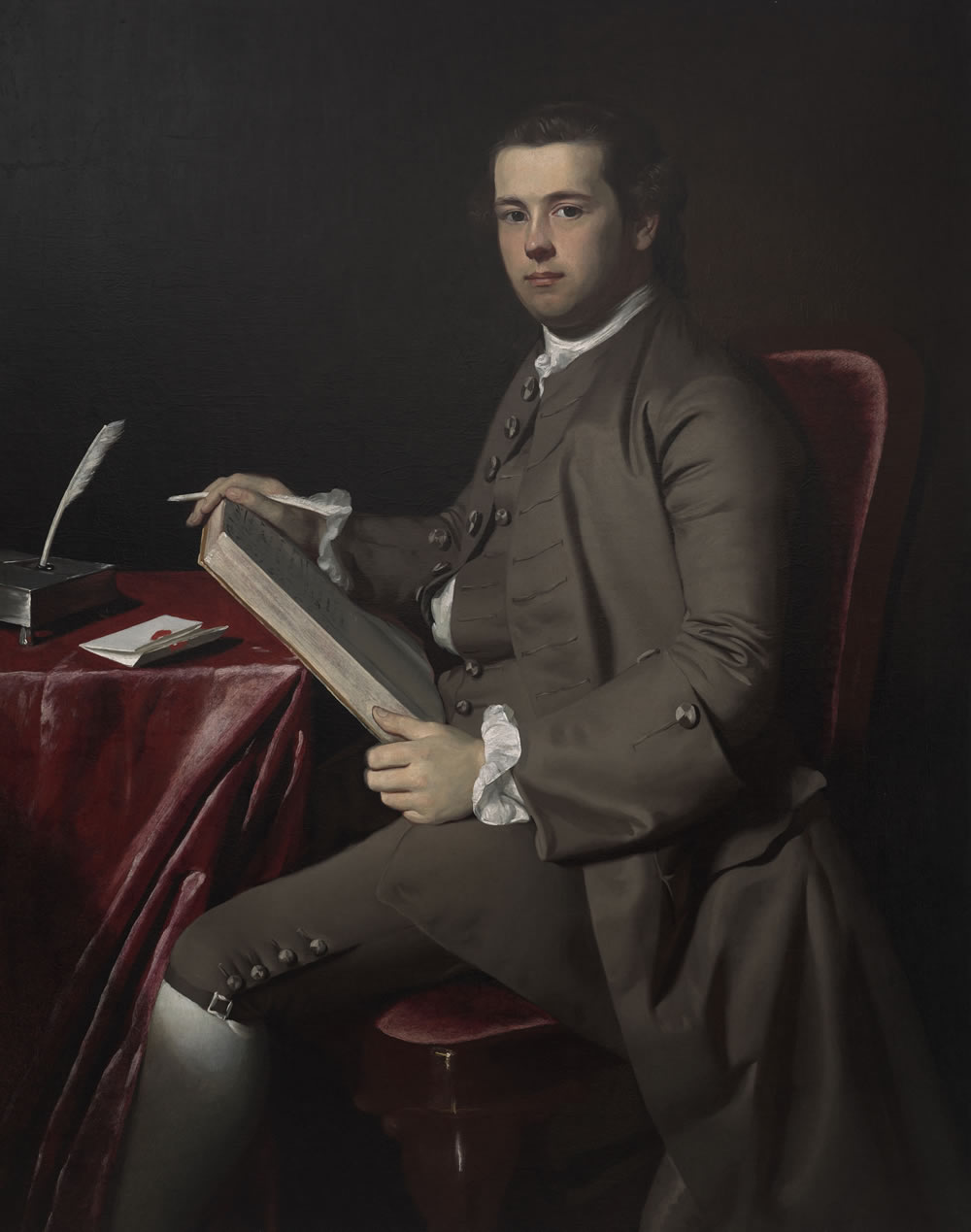
John Singleton Copley, Benjamin Hallowell Jr. 1764

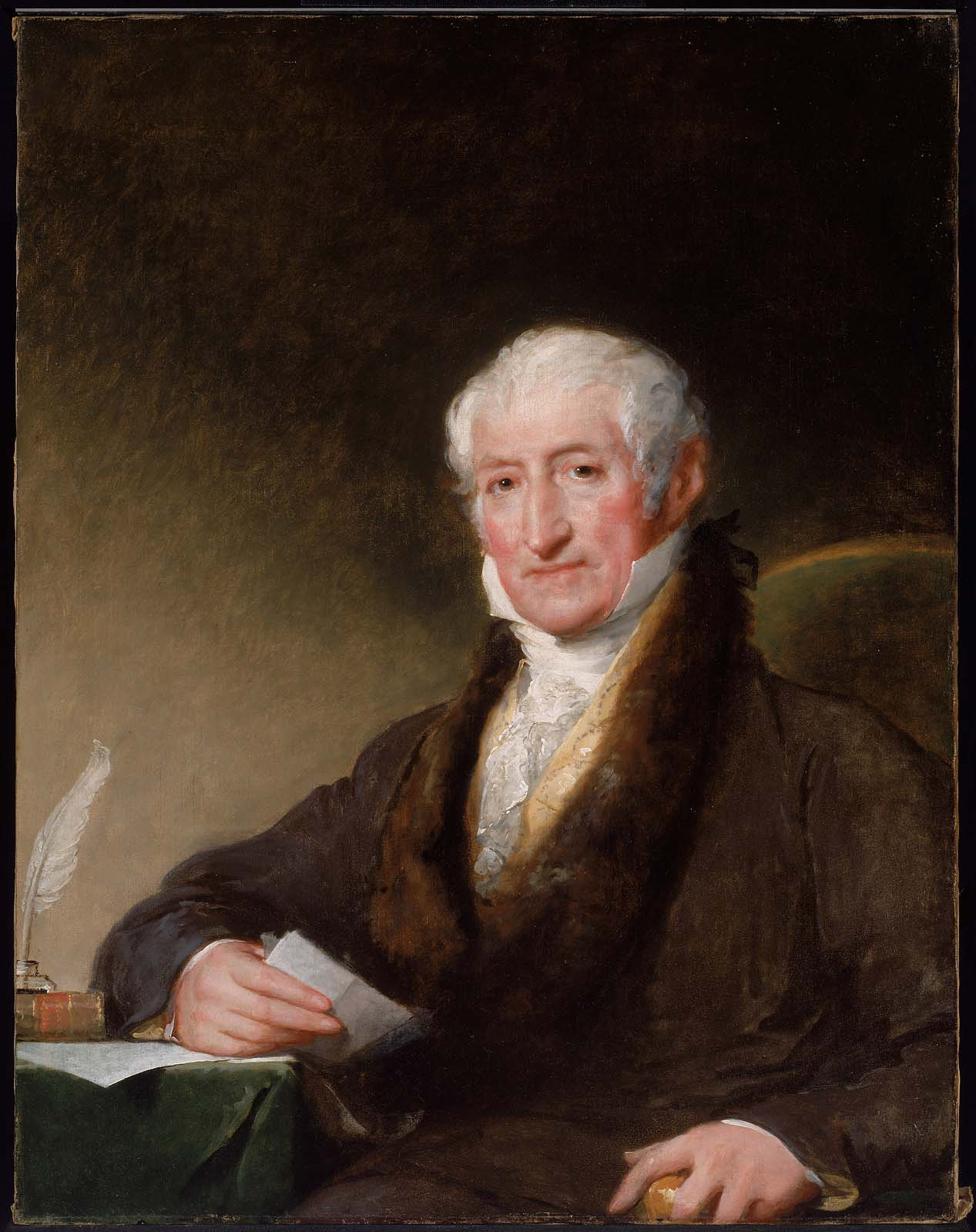
Gilbert Stuart, Ward Nicholas Boylston, 1825, Museum of Fine Arts

=== 17th century ===
- Benjamin Hallowell (1699–1773): A Boston merchant and one of the Kennebec Proprietors, holders of land originally granted to the Plymouth Company by the British monarchy in the 1620s. One of the largest owners in the Plymouth Company, Hallowell owned 50,000-acres at Hallowell, Maine. Benjamin's grandson, Robert Hallowell, took the name of Gardiner on receiving the bulk of his grandfather's (Dr. Sylvester Gardiner's) large landed estate on the Kennebec.

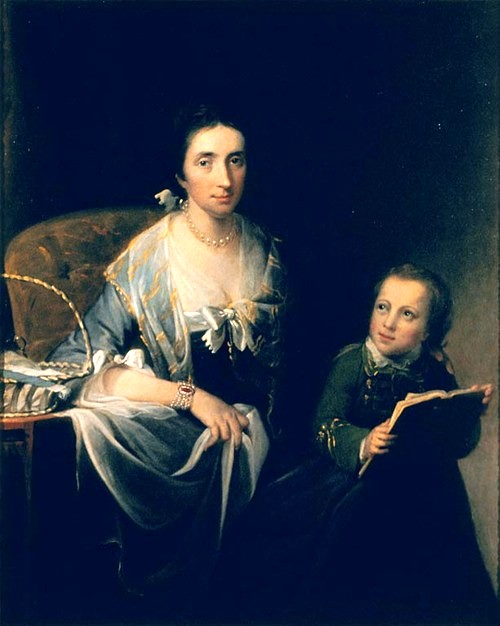
Robert Edge Pine, Portrait of Sarah Hallowell Vaughan, oil on canvas, 1760. British Embassy, Washington DC.

=== 18th century ===
- Sarah Hallowell (1727–1809): Early-American socialite, wife of Samuel Vaughan and mother of diplomat Benjamin Vaughan, merchant William Vaughan, and philanthropist John Vaughan, who developed Hallowell's lands on the Kennebec River, including the Vaughan Homestead.
- Benjamin Hallowell Jr. (1725–1799): Commissioner of Customs for the Port of Boston during the Boston Tea Party, which Samuel Adams, a relation of his through marriage, helped organize. He married Mary Boylston, the daughter of Thomas Boylston, and a first cousin of Susanna Boylston, the mother of the 2nd President of the United States, John Adams, and grandmother of the 6th President, John Quincy Adams. His children included Ward Nicholas Boylston, Admiral Sir Benjamin Hallowell-Carew, and Mary, the wife of The Hon. John Elmsley, Chief Justice of Upper Canada.
- Ward Nicholas Boylston (Hallowell) (1747–1828): Merchant and benefactor of Harvard.
- Benjamin Hallowell Carew (1761–1834): A senior officer in the Royal Navy. He was a brother of Ward Nicholas Boylston and a nephew of Governor Moses Gill.
- Robert Hallowell Gardiner (1782–1864): City developer in Gardiner, Maine
- Benjamin Hallowell (educator) (1799–1877): The first president of the Maryland Agricultural College

=== 19th century ===
- Edward Hallowell (1808–1860): Herpetologist
- Morris Longstreth Hallowell (1809–1880): Businessman, director of the Pennsylvania Railroad and the First National Bank. He was a founding member of the Union League of Philadelphia. He married Hannah Penrose, a first cousin of Charles B. Penrose.
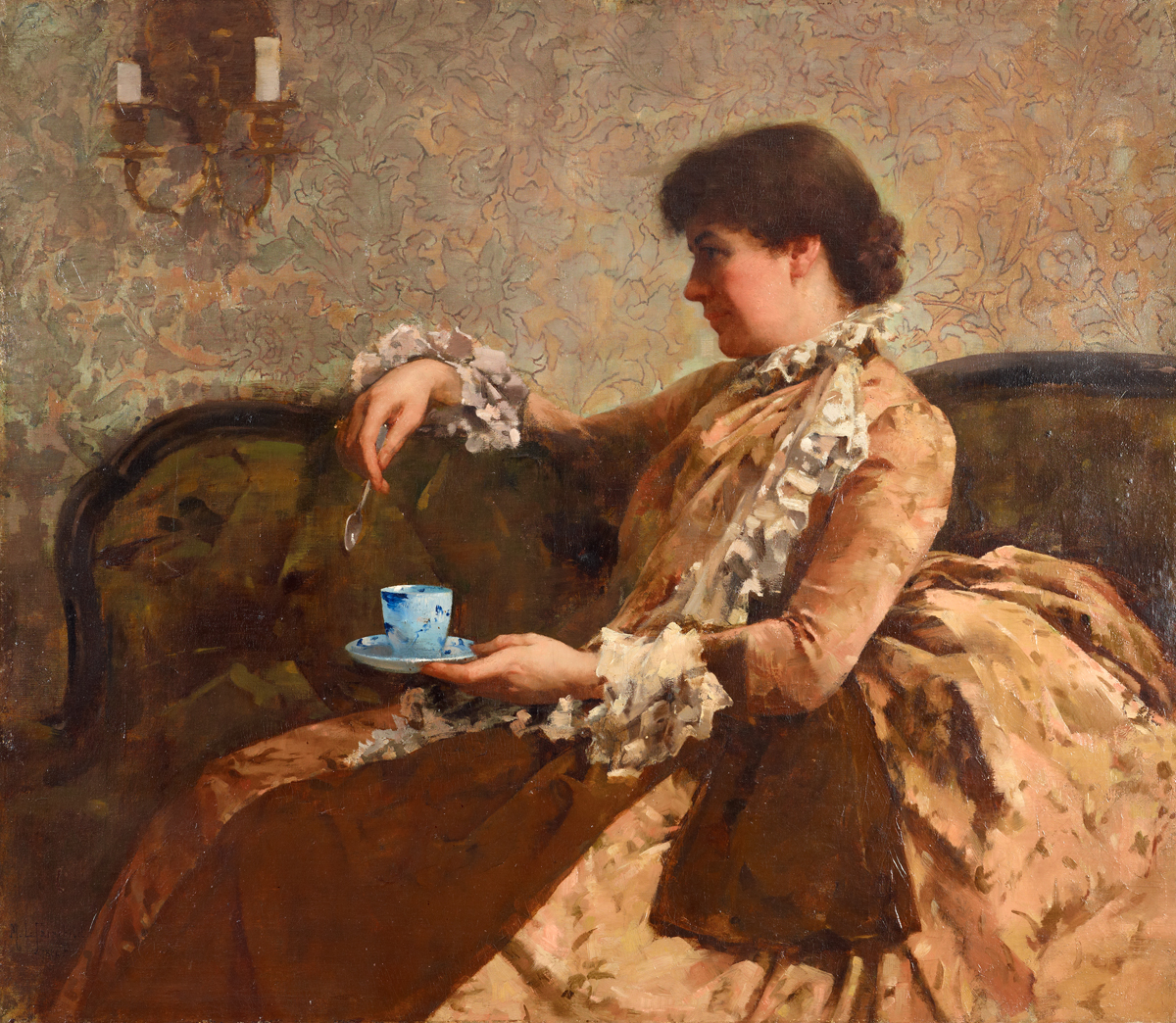
  Mary Fairchild MacMonnies Low, Mademoiselle Sarah Tyson Hallowell, 1886, University of Cambridge

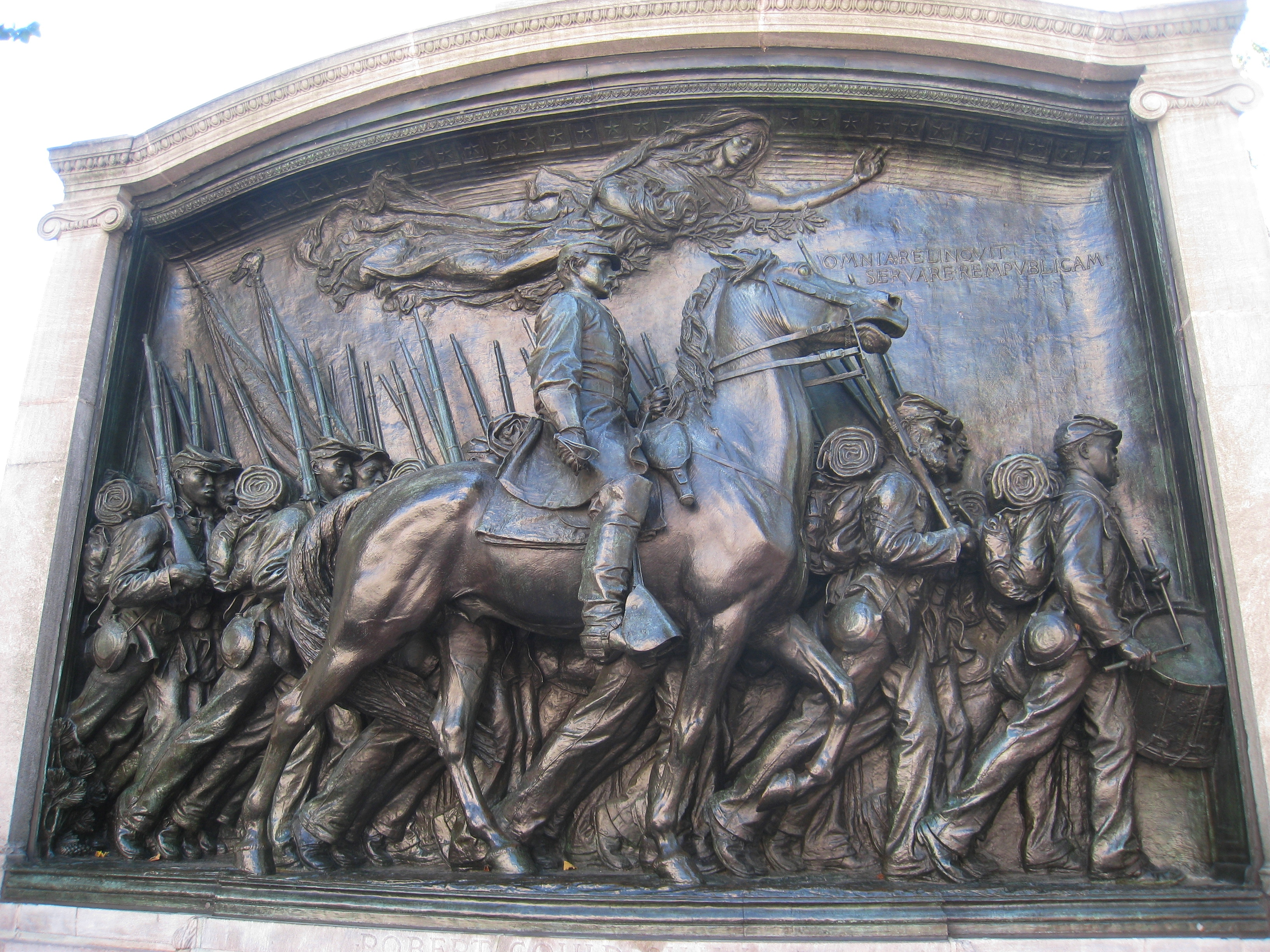
Memorial to the 54th Massachusetts Infantry Regiment

- Caroline Hallowell Miller (1831–1905): The first president of the Maryland Woman Suffrage Association; her cousin, Issac Hallowell Clothier, was a co-founder of Strawbridge's.
- Anna Hallowell (1831–1905): Civil war nurse, anti-slavery activist, and the first woman elected to The Public Board of Education in Philadelphia.
- Sarah Catherine Fraley Hallowell (1833–1914): Founder and first president of the New Century Club
- Richard Price Hallowell (1835–1904): Abolitionist, director of the National Bank of Commerce
- Edward Needles Hallowell (1836–1871): Officer in the 54th Massachusetts regiment
- Norwood Penrose Hallowell (1839–1914): Colonel in the 54th Massachusetts regiment
- James Reed Hallowell (1841–1898): Politician
- Edwin Hallowell (1844–1916): Politician
- Sarah Tyson Hallowell (1846–1924): Art curator
- May Hallowell Loud (1860–1916): Artist, suffragist and great-granddaughter of Lucretia Mott.
- Elisabeth Hallowell Saunders (1861–1910): Photographer
- Frank Hallowell (1870–1933): Football player and coach
- Harriet Hallowell (1873–1943): French-American painter
- Norwood Penrose Hallowell Jr (1875–1961): President of Lee, Higginson & Co.
- John Hallowell (1878–1927): Football player and businessman
- Alfred Irving Hallowell (1892–1974): Anthropologist, archaeologist, and businessman
- Hallowell Davis (1896–1992): Physiologist, otolaryngologist and researcher

=== 20th century ===
- Norwood Penrose Hallowell III (1909–1979): Olympic runner
- Edward Hallowell (born 1949): ADHD specialist and psychologist
