= Hallowell (surname) =

Hallowell is a surname. Notable people with the surname include:

- Anna Hallowell (1831–1905), American education reformer
- Alfred Irving Hallowell (1892–1974), American anthropologist
- Benjamin Hallowell (disambiguation), multiple people
- Edward Hallowell (herpetologist) (1808–1860), American physician and herpetologist
- Edward Hallowell (psychiatrist) (born 1949), American psychiatrist known for his work on attention-deficit hyperactivity disorder
- Edward Needles Hallowell (1836–1871), U.S. Army officer during the American Civil War
- Harriet Hallowell (1873–1943), American painter, expatriate, volunteer for the French Red Cross and advocate for Allied prisoners in World War I
- Norwood Penrose Hallowell (1839–1914), U.S. Army officer during the American Civil War
- Sarah Catherine Fraley Hallowell (1833–1914), American journalist and editor
- Sarah Tyson Hallowell (1846–1924), American curator, art agent for the Chicago Art Institute and volunteer for the French Red Cross during World War I

== See also ==
- Christina Hallowell Garrett, academic
