= Boykin =

Boykin or Boykins may refer to:

== People ==
- A. Wade Boykin, American psychologist
- Amber Boykins (b.1969), American politician from Missouri
- Brandon Boykin, American football player
- Christopher "Big Black" Boykin, American television personality
- Deral Boykin, American football player
- Devan Boykin (born 2002), American football player
- Dwight Boykins (b. 1963), American politician from Texas
- Earl Boykins, American basketball player
- Frank W. Boykin (1885-1969), American politician from Alabama
- Jarrett Boykin, American football player
- Keith Boykin (b. 1965), American broadcaster and commentator
- Laura Boykin, American computational biologist
- McKinley Boykin, American football player
- Miles Boykin, American football player
- Otis Boykin (1920-1982), American inventor and engineer
- Ronnie Boykins, jazz bassist
- Stephanie Boykin, American politician
- Trevone Boykin, American football player
- William G. Boykin (b. 1948), American general and politician

== Places ==
In the United States

- Boykin, Alabama
- Boykin, Georgia
- Boykin, South Carolina (disambiguation)
- Boykins, Virginia

== Other ==
- Boykin Spaniel, a dog breed
- Boykin's School of Art, a former African American private art academy in New York City
