= Hallowell =

Hallowell may refer to:

== Places ==
- Hallowell, Maine, United States, a city in Kennebec County
- Hallowell, Kansas, United States
- Hallowell, Ontario, Canada

== Other uses ==
- Hallowell (surname)
- Hallowell family
- USS Hallowell (PF-72), a United States Navy patrol frigate later renamed USS Machias (PF-72) and then transferred prior to completion to the United Kingdom to serve in the Royal Navy from 1943 to 1946 as HMS Anguilla (K500)
