= May Hallowell Loud =

American painter

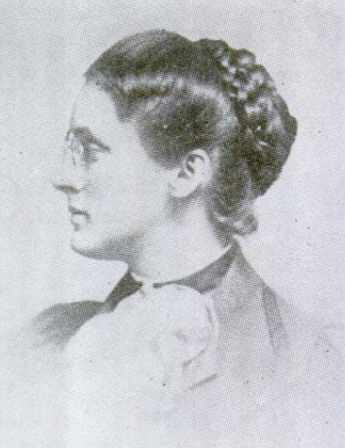
- Born: Maria Mott Hallowell; August 22, 1860; Medford, Massachusetts
- Died: February 1, 1916 (aged 55)
- Known for: Abolition and suffrage activism; Painting

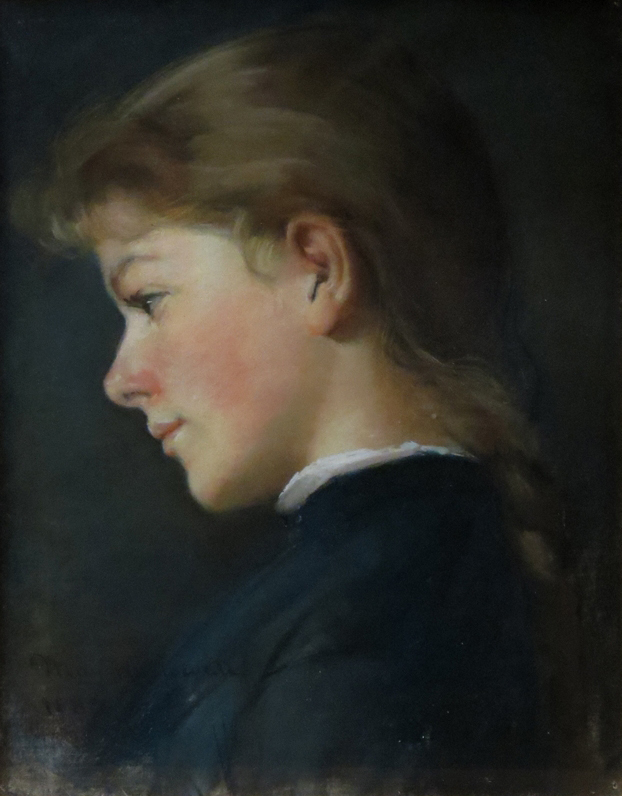
Profile Portrait of Young Woman, 1887

Maria "May" Mott Hallowell Loud (August 22, 1860 – February 1, 1916) was an American artist, suffragist, and member of the Hallowell family.

== Family and personal life ==
Maria Mott Hallowell, known as "May", was born in 1860 in Medford, Massachusetts, to Richard Price Hallowell and Anna Coffin (Davis) Hallowell. Two of her uncles fought in the Civil War, Edward Needles Hallowell and Norwood Penrose Hallowell, and her great-grandmother was the abolitionist and suffragist Lucretia Mott.

May married architect Joseph Prince Loud in 1901.

== Art education ==
Loud received some early art training from her mother, who was an amateur artist. In 1871, they went to Paris together to study art for a few months. In 1879, she enrolled at the School of the Museum of Fine Arts in Boston, where she studied with painter Otto Grundmann and became a friend of fellow student Frank Weston Benson. Together, she, Benson, and Robert Reid edited the school's publication, The Art Student.

After four years, Loud left the school and returned to France for further training, spending 1883–84 at the Académie Julian in Paris, studying with under Tony Robert-Fleury and others. On her return to the United States, she continued her training at the Cowles Art School in Boston. She also took private lessons with Abbott Thayer and Denman W. Ross.

== Art career ==
Loud worked mainly in oil, watercolor, and pastel and is best known for her portraits. Beginning in the late 1880s, she exhibited regularly for a quarter century, showing at the Paris Salon, the Palace of Fine Arts at the 1893 World's Columbian Exposition in Chicago, Illinois., the National Academy of Design, the Art Institute of Chicago, and other venues. She was active in arts organizations, sitting on the council of the School of the Museum of Fine Arts and joining the Boston Water Color Club, the Copley Society, and other organizations. In 1901, she worked as a designer for the Boston Society of Arts and Crafts.

Later in her career, she took up photography, set up her own darkroom, and began exhibiting photographs as well as paintings.

The Boston Museum of Fine Arts held a memorial exhibition of her work in late 1916.

== Public service ==
Loud and other members of her Quaker family were founding members of the Boston branch of the National Association for the Advancement of Colored People (NAACP). She sat on the branch's board of directors and was considered one of its key members. She also fund-raised for the Calhoun Colored School in Alabama.
