= N. Penrose Hallowell =

Norwood Penrose Hallowell (July 3, 1875 – February 13, 1961) was an American banker who served as president of the Lee Higginson Corporation.

== Early life ==
Hallowell was born on July 3, 1875, in Medford, Massachusetts, into the prominent Hallowell family. He was a son of Col. Norwood Penrose Hallowell and Sarah Wharton (née Haydock) Hallowell (1846–1934). Among his siblings were brother John Hallowell, who was a prominent football player at Harvard.

His paternal grandparents were Morris Longstreth Hallowell, and Hannah (née Penrose) Norwood. Among his paternal family were uncle Edward Needles Hallowell and aunt, Anna Hallowell. His mother was a niece of Joseph Wharton, founder of the Wharton School of the University of Pennsylvania, and a granddaughter of Deborah Fisher Wharton.

Hallowell graduated from Harvard College in 1897. Later, he served as on overseer of Harvard from 1920 to 1926 and also was a member of the visiting committee of the Harvard Graduate School of Business Administration.

== Career ==
In 1905, Hallowell became a partner in Lee, Higginson & Co. in Boston. From 1916 to 1939, he was a partner in Higginson & Co. in London. He became executive vice president in 1932, and chairman of the board in 1940. From 1942 to 1948, he served as president, until he was elevated to chairman of the board.

He served as a director of the Gillette Company and the Chicago Pneumatic Tool Company. For fifty years, he was a trustee of the Milton Academy and former president of the board of trustees. At the time of his death, he was an honorary trustee of the Boston Symphony Orchestra.

During World War I, he was executive chairman of the Liberty Loan Committee of New England and during World War II, he served on a local Selective Service board in New York.

== Personal life ==
Hallowell was married to Margaret Ingersoll Bowditch (1881–1953), a daughter of Alfred Bowditch and Mary Louisa (née Rice) Bowditch. Her uncles included Charles Pickering Bowditch and Henry Pickering Bowditch. While Hallowell was working in Boston, they lived in Milton, Massachusetts, the affluent suburb of Boston. Together, they lived at Brush Hill in Readville, Boston, before moving to New York, where they lived at 125 East 72nd Street. They were the parents of four daughters and two sons:

- Mary Bowditch Hallowell (1902–1992), who married the Rev. John Crocker in 1922; he served as headmaster of the Groton School from 1940 to 1955.
- Hannah Penrose Hallowell (1904–1987), who married Nelson Bigelow, a son of Henry Forbes Bigelow, in 1929.
- Ellen Rice Hallowell (1906–2000), who married Harold Irving Pratt Jr., son of Harriet Barnes Pratt and Harold I. Pratt, in 1929.
- Norwood Penrose Hallowell III (1909–1979), who married Priscilla Choate, a daughter of Joseph H. Choate Jr. and granddaughter of Ambassador Joseph Hodges Choate, in 1933.
- Margaret Hallowell (1916–2013), who married Yale Law graduate Charles P. Williamson in 1940.
- Alfred Bowditch Hallowell (1911–1989), who married Olivia Morgan, a daughter of Laurence W. Morgan of Dedham, Massachusetts, in 1936.

After the death of his first wife in 1953, he married Cornelia Fitch (née Middlebrook) Baekeland at Christ Church United Methodist in New York City on October 13, 1954. From her first marriage to George Washington Baekeland (a son of Bakelite inventor Leo Baekeland), she was the mother of actress Cornelia B. von Hessert (wife of Baron Gerhard von Hessert). They lived at 1158 Fifth Avenue at 97th Street, of which he served as a director.

Hallowell died at Roosevelt Hospital in New York City on February 13, 1961.
