= Susanna Boylston Adams =

Susanna Boylston Adams may refer to:

- Susanna Boylston (1708–1797), mother of U.S. President John Adams And a grandmother of U.S. President John Quincy Adams
- Susanna Adams (1768–1770), daughter of U.S. President John Adams
