= Boykin, South Carolina =

Boykin, South Carolina may refer to:

- Boykin, Kershaw County, South Carolina, a census-designated place
  - Battle of Boykin's Mill, fought between Union and Confederate forces in Kershaw County (1865)
  - Boykin Mill Complex, Kershaw County
