= Robert Galambos =

American neuroscientist (1914–2010)

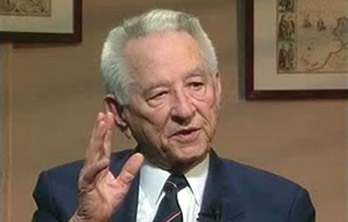
Robert Galambos

Robert Carl Galambos (April 20, 1914 – June 18, 2010) was an American neuroscientist whose pioneering research demonstrated how bats use echolocation for navigation purposes, as well as studies on how sound is processed in the brain.

== Biography ==
Galambos was born on April 20, 1914, in Lorain, Ohio, and was awarded his undergraduate and master's degrees in the field of zoology from Oberlin College, with earthworm locomotion as the subject of his master's dissertation, He attended Harvard University, where he was awarded a Ph.D. based on his research on bats. At Harvard, Galambos performed experiments for the military on the relationship between the shock waves from explosions and hearing loss. He earned his medical degree from the University of Rochester School of Medicine and interned at Emory University Hospital. After working as a researcher at Harvard, he partnered with future Nobel Prize winner David H. Hubel at the Walter Reed Army Institute of Research, where they studied how cats respond to unexpected sounds.

In the late 1930s, Galambos worked with Donald Griffin on studies of animal echolocation. Using sound capture technology that had been developed by physicist G. W. Pierce, Galambos and Pierce were able to determine that bats generate and hear sounds an octave higher than can be heard by humans and other animals. Experiments they conducted used methods developed by Hallowell Davis to monitor the brains of bats and their hearing responses as they navigated their way past wires suspended from a laboratory ceiling. They showed how bats used echolocation to accurately avoid obstacles, which they were unable to do if their mouths or ears were kept shut. Griffin coined the term "echolocation" in 1944 to describe the phenomenon, which many physiologists of the day could not believe was possible.

Using electrodes implanted in the brains of animals, Galambos was able to use electronic amplifiers to boost the signals of a single nerve to follow the impulses that travel from the ear to the brain in response to auditory stimuli, which allowed him to track how neurons respond to the presence (or absence) of sound at a particular frequency. This research allowed for the development of hearing tests for infants which could be performed by monitoring the brain's response directly to sounds, and could then be used to prescribe hearing aids. The research led to the development of auditory brainstem implants and cochlear implants which could be surgically implanted to allow individuals to regain the ability to hear for the profoundly deaf. With John S. O'Brien, he co-founded the department of neuroscience at the University of California, San Diego, and continued his research there after he was required to retire at age 67.

Galambos was inducted in 1960 as a member of the National Academy of Sciences and was a member of the American Academy of Arts and Sciences.

Galambos died at age 96 on June 18, 2010, of congestive heart failure at his home in La Jolla, San Diego, California. He was survived by his third wife, Phyllis Johnson. He was also survived by three daughters from his first marriage, to Jeannette Wright Stone, five grandchildren and three great-grandchildren. His second wife, Carol Armstrong Schulman predeceased him.
