= Ward Nicholas Boylston =

American philanthropist

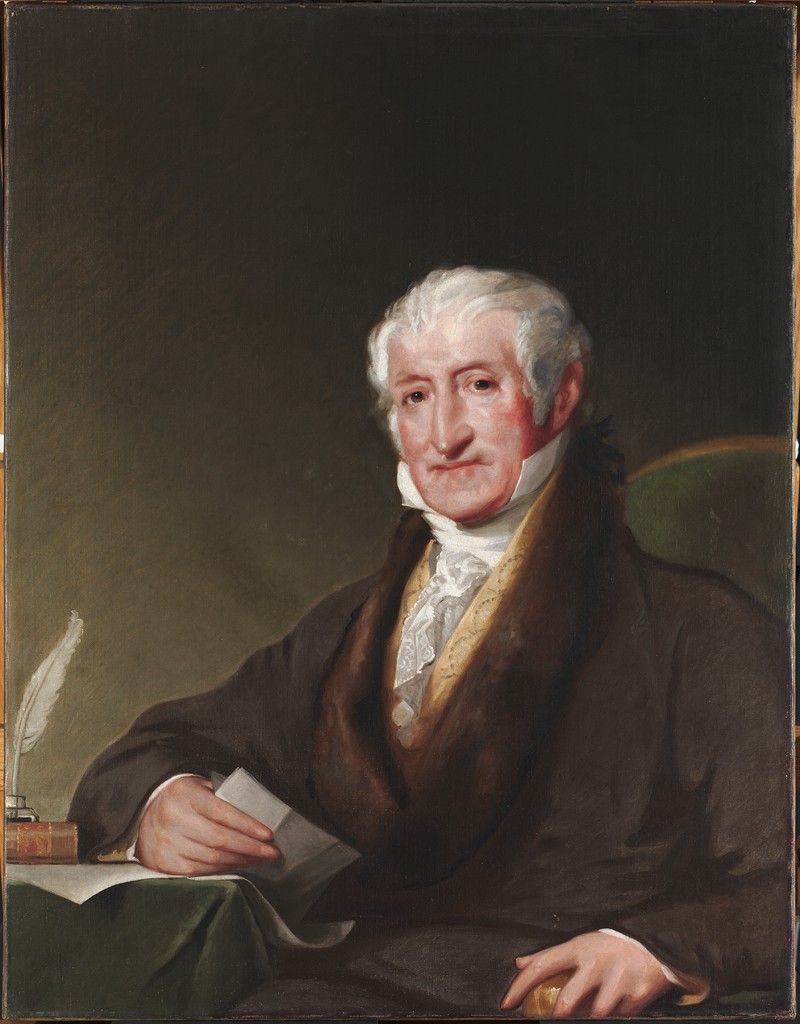
- An 1825 portrait of Boylston by Gilbert Stuart
- Born: Ward Hallowell; 1747
- Died: 1828 (aged 80-81)
- Spouse(s): Ann Molineaux; Alicia Darrow
- Parent(s): Mary Boylston; Benjamin Hallowell
- Relatives: see Hallowell family John Adams (second cousin) (see Adams Family)

Ward Nicholas Boylston (1747–1828; born Ward Hallowell), was an American merchant, a philanthropist, and benefactor of Harvard University.

== Early life ==
Boylston was born in Boston, Province of Massachusetts, and spent much of his life there. His father, Benjamin Hallowell III, Esq., was the Commissioner of Customs, and the family lived in the Jamaica Plain end of what was then the town of Roxbury, just south of Boston. His mother, Mary (Boylston) Hallowell, was the daughter of Thomas Boylston and granddaughter of physician Thomas Boylston Jr. Her uncle was the physician Zabdiel Boylston. Mary's first cousin Susanna Boylston was the mother of the second president of the United States, John Adams, and grandmother of the sixth president, John Quincy Adams.

== Philanthropy ==
Boylston bequeathed to Harvard University, on behalf of his uncle, Nicholas Boylston, $23,200 as a foundation of a professorship in Rhetoric and Oratory, specifying that John Quincy Adams should be appointed professor. He continued to donate large sums of money to Harvard, and in 1810 gave them a valuable collection of medical and anatomical works and engravings. He donated funds for Harvard's Boylston Medical Library and the Boylston Anatomical Museum, for various prizes for medical dissertations, and for the Boylston Medical Society.

The Suffolk County Records state that "To the inhabitants of the town of Princeton he gave $1000, one half to be paid to the deacons of the Church and congregation over which Rev'd Samuel Clarke was pastor, the net income to be applied towards the salary of the minister. The remaining five hundred dollars to be loaned to industrious young men in the town until it doubled when the income should be expended for the support of indigent and deserving widows and female orphan children."

According to Dr. Nathan Allen, "Mr. Boylston, while in Princeton, lived in princely style and was remarkable for his politeness to all with whom lie came in contact. He possessed an unusual amount of intelligence and liberality in his benefactions. While residing in London he became familiarly acquainted with the celebrated Dr. John Hunter, and having had two uncles in this country distinguished members of the medical profession, he became greatly interested in all matters pertaining to medicine. For this purpose he made some handsome donations to Harvard University, so that the name Boylston is honored, being attached to a medical library, an anatomical museum, a medical society and prize medals for essays to improve medical science."

Both Boylston Street in Boston and Boylston Street in Jamaica Plain are named after him, as is the town of Boylston, Massachusetts, Boylston Hall at Harvard University, and the Boylston Professorship of Rhetoric and Oratory at Harvard in honor of his uncle, Nicholas Boylston.

== Personal life ==
Boylston was a brother of Admiral Sir Benjamin Hallowell Carew, one of Nelson's Band of Brothers, and a nephew of governor Moses Gill. He was brother-in-law to John Elmsley, Chief Justice of Upper and Lower Canada, via marriage to his sister Mary.

He was elected a member of the American Antiquarian Society in 1819.

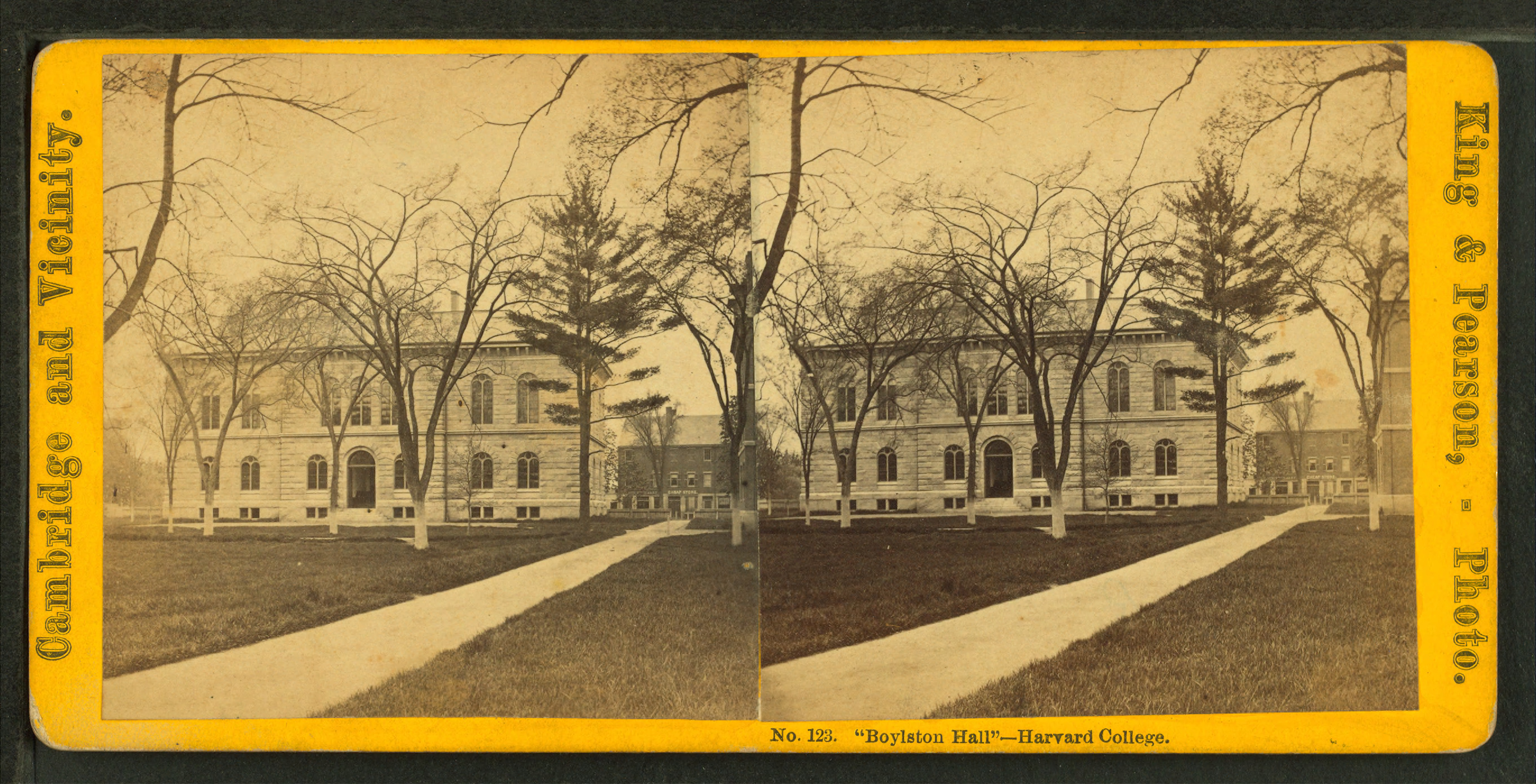
Boylston Hall, Harvard University
