= Hallowell Davis =

American physiologist (1896–1992)

- Born: August 31, 1896; New York
- Died: August 22, 1992 (aged 95); St. Louis, Missouri
- Education: Harvard University
- Known for: Physiology of hearing and the inner ear
- Spouse(s): Pauline Allen (m. 1923, d. 1942); Florence Eaton (m. 1944, d. 1980); Nancy Gilson m. 1983)
- Relatives: Norwood Penrose Hallowell (grandfather)
- Awards: ASA Gold Medal, National Medal of Science
- Scientific career
- Fields: Physiology
- Workplaces: Harvard University; Central Institute for the Deaf; Washington University in St. Louis
- Academic advisors: Edgar Adrian

Hallowell Davis (August 31, 1896 – August 22, 1992) was an American physiologist, otolaryngologist and researcher who did pioneering work on the physiology of hearing and the inner ear. He served as director of research at the Central Institute for the Deaf in St. Louis, Missouri.

== Early life ==
Hallowell Davis was born on August 31, 1896, in New York City, the son of attorney Horace A. Davis, and Anna Norwood (née Hallowell) Davis. His great-grandfather was Massachusetts Governor John Davis, and his grandfather was Civil War Officer Norwood Penrose Hallowell. He graduated from Harvard College in 1918, where he was the class orator at graduation. He earned his medical degree from Harvard Medical School in 1922 and then spent a year at the University of Cambridge where he was trained in electrophysiology in the laboratory of Edgar Adrian.

In 1925, Harvard named Davis to serve as an official tutor and instructor in pre-medical sciences, as a means of helping prepare students intending to advance to Harvard and other medical schools to "get the soundest general foundation possible for their medical education". After the year in England, he returned to teach at Harvard and became an assistant professor at Harvard College in 1927 and the school's first tutor in biochemical sciences, later becoming the director of the school's Psycho-Acoustic Laboratory. He was elected to the American Academy of Arts and Sciences in 1929.

== Audiology pioneer ==
During the 1930s, Davis participated in the development of electroencephalography and was the first person in the United States to have his brain waves scanned by an EEG device. He focused on the physiology of the inner ear, investigating how neurological impulses are transmitted to the brain via the cochlear nerve. His studies led to the development of electrical-response audiometry, which allowed diagnosis of hearing difficulties in infants. Robert Galambos credited Davis with coining the word "audiology" in the 1940s, with Davis saying the then-prevalent term "auricular training" sounded like a method of teaching people how to wiggle their ears.

Davis moved to the Central Institute for the Deaf, where some of his early work was for the Veterans Administration in the development of improved hearing aids for soldiers who had experienced hearing loss. Combining aspects and research from the fields of behaviorism, electroacoustic engineering and electrophysiology, Davis was able to advance the study of the field, which could be seen in his 1947 work Hearing and Deafness: A Guide for the Layman, which he co-edited with S. Richard Silverman. In 1948, he was elected to the United States National Academy of Sciences. He was also a professor of physiology at the Washington University School of Medicine, where he lectured on hearing and speech. Research by Davis presented to the British Association for the Advancement of Science in 1952 showed that hair cells in the inner ear play a pivotal role in transforming the mechanical stimulus of sound into electrical impulses to be sent to and processed by the brain.

During the 1960s, Davis served on the National Research Council's Committee on the Sonic Boom and Supersonic Transport, where he argued that the noise would result in hearing irritation to the public, in addition to being an economic risk. He was elected to the American Philosophical Society in 1965.

Davis was awarded the Acoustical Society of America Gold Medal in 1965 and the National Medal of Science in 1975.

== Personal life ==
He married the former Pauline Allen in 1923 at a refugee camp near Istanbul, where they were treating those with typhus, smallpox and other diseases. She served as his research partner until her death in 1942. He married Florence Eaton in 1944 and then Nancy Gilson in 1983, three years after the death of his second wife.

Davis was a resident of University City, Missouri. He died at age 95 on August 22, 1992, at the Bethesda Dalworth Home in St. Louis. He was survived by his third wife, Nancy, as well as a daughter, two sons, four grandchildren and four great-grandchildren. He donated his inner ear for scientific research.
