= Zabdiel Boylston =

Boston physician (1679–1766)

- Born: March 9, 1679; Muddy River, Massachusetts
- Died: March 1, 1766 (aged 86)
- Relatives: Susanna Boylston (niece); John Adams (great-nephew); Ward Nicholas Boylston (great-nephew)

Zabdiel Boylston, FRS (March 9, 1679 – March 1, 1766) was a physician in the Boston area. As the first medical school in North America was not founded until 1765, Boylston apprenticed with his father, a surgeon named Thomas Boylston, and studied under the Boston physician Dr. Cutler. Boylston is known for holding several "firsts" for an American-born physician: he performed the first surgical operation by an American physician, the first removal of gall bladder stones in 1710, and the first removal of a breast tumor in 1718. He was also the first physician to perform smallpox inoculations in North America.

He was a great uncle of President John Adams, as well as philanthropist Ward Nicholas Boylston.

== Early life and education ==
Zabdiel Boylston was born on March 9, 1679, in Muddy River, Massachusetts (now part of Brookline), the son of Thomas (1644–1695) and Mary (Gardner) Boylston (1648–1722). He married Jerusha Minot (1679–1764) in 1706. His son, John, was born in 1709.

As the first medical school in North America was not founded until 1765, Boylston apprenticed with his father, a surgeon originally from Watertown, Massachusetts, and studied under the Boston physician Dr. John Cutler.

== Career ==
Boylston is known for holding several "firsts" for an American-born physician: he performed the first surgical operation by an American physician, the first removal of gall bladder stones in 1710, and the first removal of a breast tumor in 1718.

Onesimus, an enslaved African, taught inoculation to Cotton Mather, the influential New England Puritan minister. That idea was substantiated by letters published from Emmanuel Timoni, a physician to Great Britain's ambassador to Turkey. During a smallpox outbreak in 1721 in Boston, Boylston inoculated two Africans enslaved by him, Jack, 36, and his son Jackey, 2, and Boylston's own son Thomas, who was 6 at the time, by applying pus from a smallpox sore to a small wound on the subjects, the method previously used in Africa. This was the first introduction of inoculations to North America.

His method was initially met by hostility and outright violence from other physicians, and many threats were made on his life, with some even threatening to hang him on the nearest tree. He was forced to hide in a private place of his house for 14 days, a secret known only by his wife. After his initial inoculations of his son and the two enslaved Africans, he was arrested for a short period of time for it (he was later released with the promise not to inoculate without government permission). During this hostility, his family was also in a dangerous situation. His wife and children were sitting in their home and a lighted hand-grenade was thrown into the room, but the fuse fell off before an explosion could take place. Even after the violence had subsided, he visited his patients only at midnight and while disguised. He inoculated about 248 people.

In 1724, with a letter of introduction to Dr. James Jurin by Cotton Mather, Boylston traveled to London, where he published his results as Historical Account of the Small-Pox Inoculated in New England, and he became a fellow of the Royal Society two years later. Afterward, he returned to Boston.

== See also ==
- Dr. Zabdiel Boylston Adams Jr. (October 25, 1829 – May 1, 1902)
