= Benjamin Hallowell =

Benjamin Hallowell may refer to:

- Benjamin Hallowell Carew (born Benjamin Hallowell), British naval officer of the Napoleonic era
- Benjamin Hallowell Sr (1723–1799), former naval captain, Commissioner of the Board of Customs and father of Benjamin Hallowell Carew.
- Benjamin Hallowell (educator), first president of the Maryland Agricultural College
