= Boykin's School of Art =

American art academy

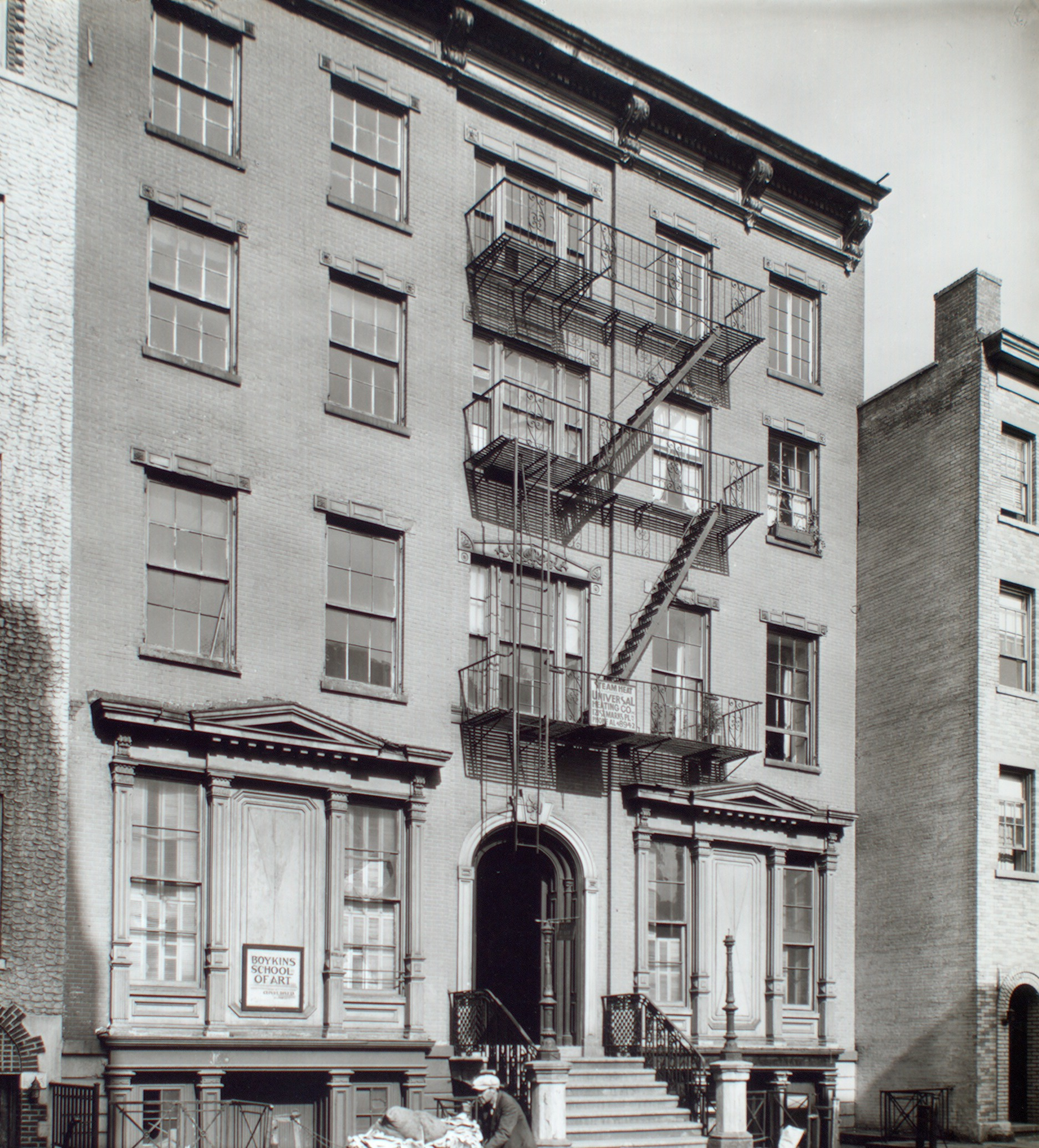
- Boykin's School of Art building (1935), in Greenwich Village, New York City
- 43–45 Grove Ave., New York City (1929–1935) 1207 1/2 Arctic Ave., Atlantic City, New Jersey 311 Columbus Ave., Boston, Massachusetts

Information
- Other names: Boykin's Arts and Crafts Studio, Boykin School of Art, Boykin's School of Art and Research, Boykin's School of Arts and Crafts
- Founded: c. 1915, Boston
- Founder: Cloyd Lee Boykin
- Closed: 1935

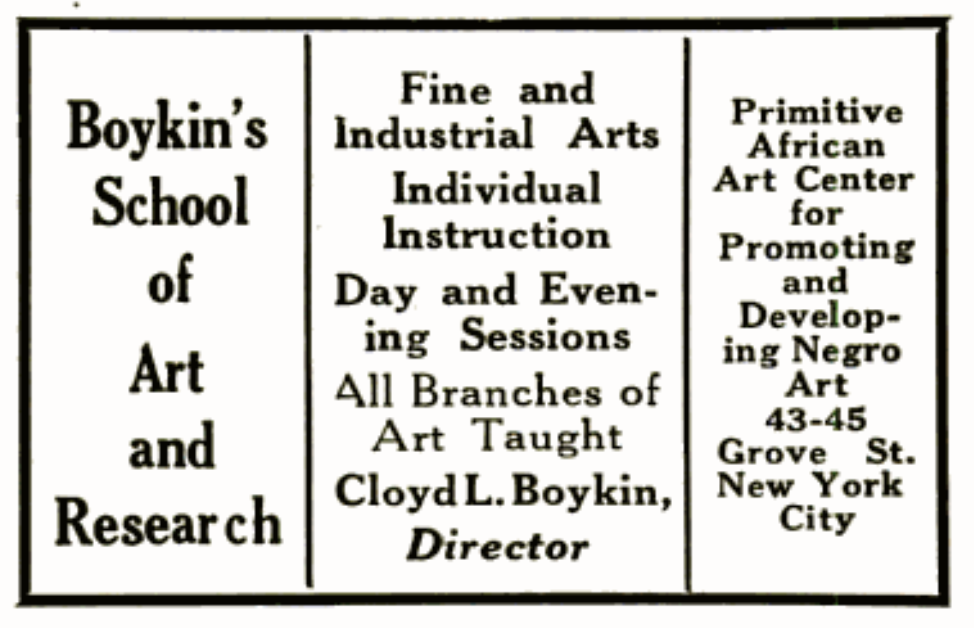
Ad for the school (1930)

Boykin's School of Art was a private, non-degree-granting art academy established c. 1915 and operated to provide African American students an arts education during an era of racial segregation. It was founded by artist Cloyd Lee Boykin (c. 1877–1957). The school went by many names including the Boykin's Arts and Crafts Studio, Boykin School of Art, Boykin's School of Art and Research, and Boykin's School of Arts and Crafts.

== History ==
Boykin's School of Art appears to have started around 1915 in Boston, followed by a period in the 1920s in Atlantic City. It was first art school for African Americans in New York City when it opened at that location in 1929. It was founded by artist Cloyd Lee Boykin (c. 1877–1957). The school taught a wide range of subjects including fine arts, commercial arts, industrial arts, and crafts. In the 1930s, this school was an important meeting place for Black artists and intellectuals, particularly those associated with the Harlem Renaissance.
