= Battle of Boykin's Mill =

Battle of the American Civil War

Coordinates: 34.129°N 80.579°W

The 1865 battle of Boykin's Mill was the site of the last Union officer killed in action during the American Civil War. It was also the location of the final battle on South Carolina soil.

== History ==
Brigadier General Edward E. Potter took command of the two Northern brigades—2700 men—recently landed at Georgetown. Colonel Edward N. Hallowell, former commander of the famed 54th Massachusetts Volunteer Infantry Regiment and wounded at Fort Wagner, led one of the brigades including his former unit now consisting of over 700 men. Under orders to disable railroads in South Carolina, Potter's brigades were forced to contend with Kentucky's "Orphan Brigade" of mounted infantry from April 9 at Dingle's Mill through 18 April.

On April 18, 1865, Potter's troops met again with the Kentuckians in the quiet town of Boykin, South Carolina. The Confederates held a strong defensive position in an abandoned fort. Sergeant Major Joseph Thomas Wilson later wrote about this fort: "No better position could be found for a defense, as the only approach to it, was by a narrow embankment about 200 yards long, where only one could walk at a time." The 54th Massachusetts was given the job and sustained two killed and thirteen wounded before Confederate troops, heavily outnumbered, ran from the field. The dead men were Private James P. Johnson of Company F, a barber 21 years of age from Owego, NY, and First Lieutenant E.L. Stevens, the latter being the last Federal officer killed in action during the war. Stevens was killed by 14-year-old Burrell H. Boykin, a member of the Confederate Home Guard whose family owned the land the Union troops were moving through.

Union troops pursued the fleeing Southerners unsuccessfully, and the mill was burned to the ground according to Major General William T. Sherman's "Scorched Earth" policy. The engagement proved to be the bloodiest battle of the campaign for the 54th which had had the highest casualty rate of the operation. However, the two opposing units (Potter's and the Kentuckians) continued to skirmish through April 19 at Dinkin's Mill where they fought the last major conflict of the Eastern Theater. The preliminary cessation of hostilities was announced to both sides two days later though Confederate General Johnston did not officially surrender until 26 April.

== See also ==
- Boykin Mill Complex
