= John Hallowell =

American football player and businessman (1878–1927)

John White Hallowell
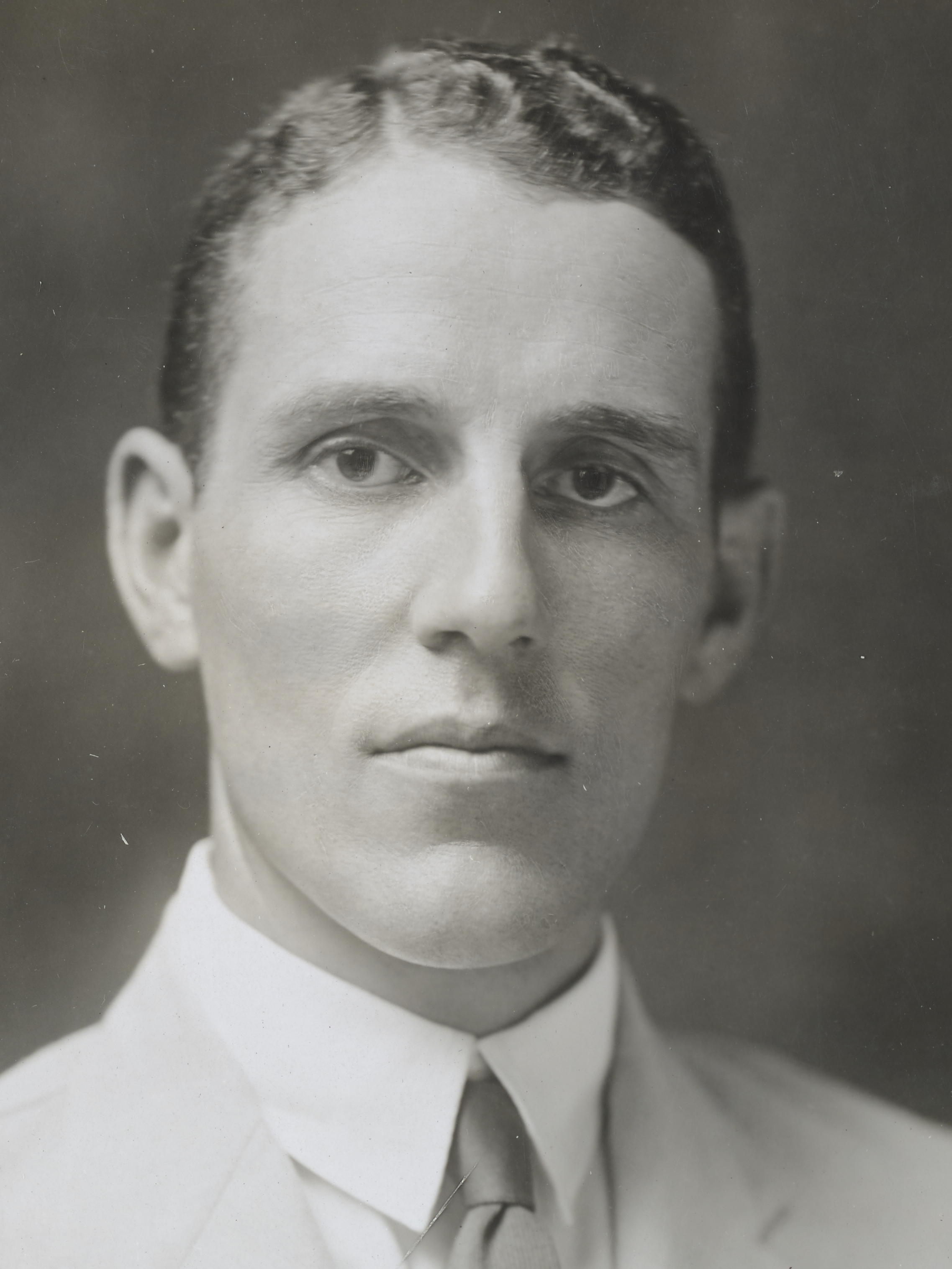
- United States Food Administration
- Born: December 24, 1878 "Nöddebo" Medford, Massachusetts, U.S.
- Died: January 5, 1927 (aged 48); Milton, Massachusetts, U.S.
- Education: Harvard
- Occupations: Businessman, Football Player

John White Hallowell (December 24, 1878 – January 5, 1927) was a prominent American businessman and football player. He played college football at Harvard University and was a consensus All-American at the end position in both 1898 and 1900. Hallowell served in the U.S. Food Administration, and was chairman of the New England Committee for Supplementary Rations for Belgian Children during World War I. After the War, Hallowell served as assistant to the Secretary of the Interior, Franklin K. Lane.

== Early life ==
Born and raised at "Nöddebo", the Hallowell estate in West Medford, Massachusetts, John "Jack" Hallowell was the fourth child of Col Norwood Penrose Hallowell and Sarah Wharton Haydock.

== Harvard ==
Like much of his family, Hallowell played an important role in Harvard athletics. Like his brothers N. Penrose Hallowell and Robert Haydock Hallowell, he enrolled at Harvard University as part of the Class of 1901. He played college football for the Harvard Crimson football team from 1898 to 1900. He was a consensus All-American in both 1898 and 1900 while playing at the end position for the Harvard Crimson football team. His father, Col Norwood Penrose Hallowell, road out on horseback from their estate in Medford to attend his son’s football games. Hallowell was also a hurdler and captain of the track team. He went to England with the Harvard-Yale track team for the first meet with Oxford and Cambridge in 1899. He served as class treasurer, chairman of the Class Committee, and president of the Associated Harvard Clubs while attending Harvard. At Harvard, he was also a member of the Porcelian Club, the Delta Phi Club, the Hasty Pudding, the Dickey, and the Institute of 1770.

== Later life ==
John Hallowell
Profile
- Position: End

Career information
- College: Harvard University (1898–1901)

Awards and highlights
- 2× Consensus All-American (1898, 1900); Second-team All-American (1899)

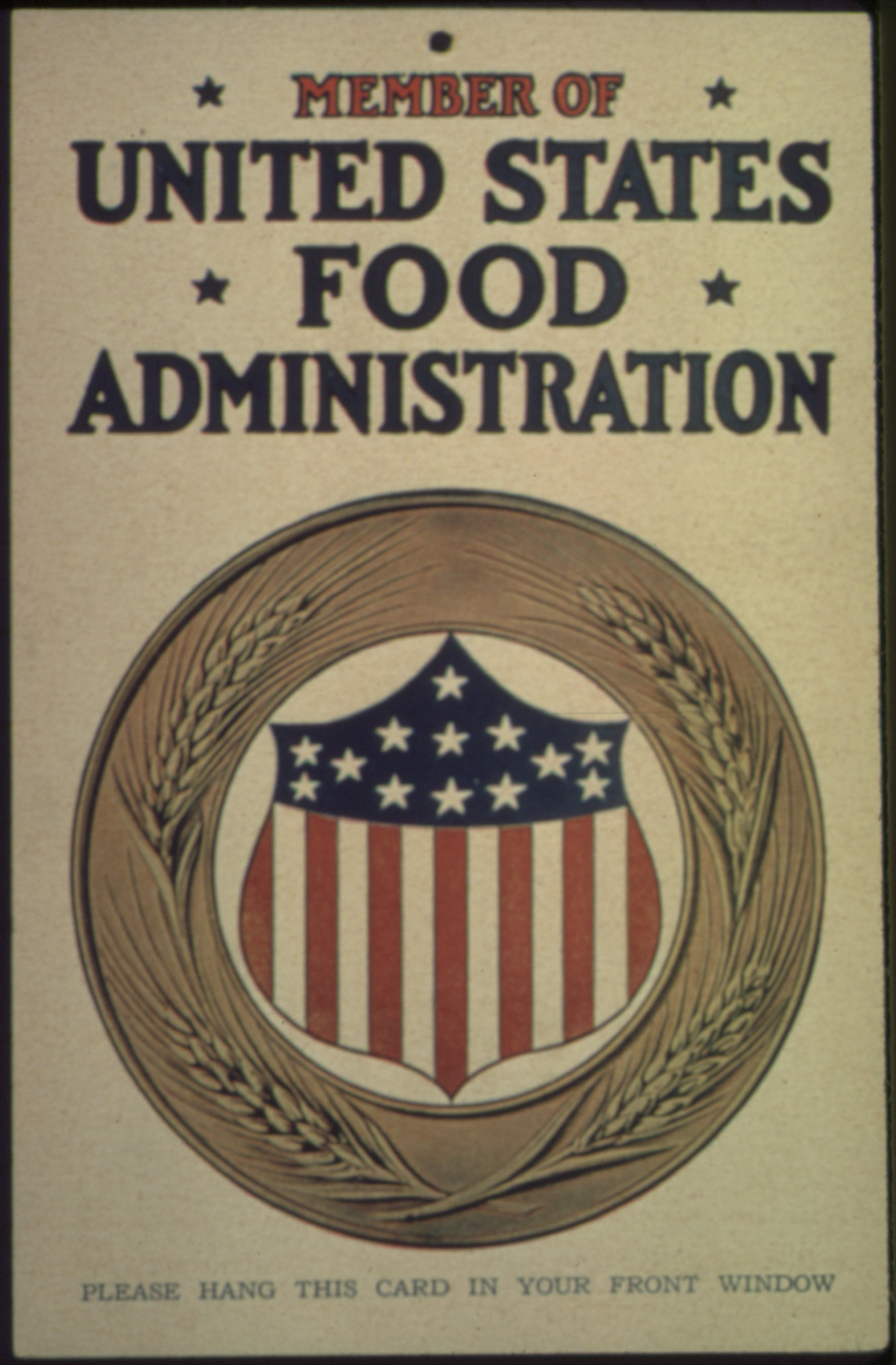
Window card from United States Food Administration

After graduating from Harvard in 1901, he took a position in the securities department at the utilities consulting firm Stone & Webster, Inc. in Boston, where he became a partner and worked for sixteen years. At the outbreak of World War I, he became chairman of the New England Committee for Supplementary Rations for Belgian Children. During and after World War I, he served as an assistant to Herbert Hoover in the United States Food Administration in Belgium and other parts of Europe. He later became assistant to the Secretary of the Interior, Franklin K. Lane. He was also appointed to the United States Council of National Defenses Emergency Employment Committee for Soldiers and Sailors. In 1918, Hallowell was decorated by King Albert of Belgium for his efforts during the war. After the war, Hallowell became the director of The Wilmington & Franklin Coal Company in Chicago, a director of Richards & Co, and later joined the Board of the Boston Chamber of Commerce.

In addition to sitting on many corporate boards, including The Children's Hospital and the Middlesex School in Concord, Hallowell was treasurer of the Harvard Alumni Bulletin, treasurer of the Harvard Alumni Association, a member of the Harvard Fund Council, President of the Harvard Associated clubs, and, like his brothers Norwood Penrose Hallowell and Robert Haydock Hallowell, as well as his cousin Richard Price Hallowell Jr, he joined the Board of Overseers at Harvard University from 1914 to 1925.

In the early twentieth century, John, his brother Robert, and his cousin N. Penrose Jr moved to houses on Brush Hill Road in Milton, Massachusetts. He maintained a summer home on Wing’s Neck in Bourne, Massachusetts.

== Personal life ==
In 1905, Hallowell married Marian Hathaway Ladd (1884–1968), a cousin of Horatio Hathaway and a granddaughter of Alexander Hamilton Ladd, owner of the Moffatt-Ladd House. They had five children:

- William Ladd Hallowell (August 18, 1906 – January 10, 1978), who married Margaret Dillenger Barney, a granddaughter of Thomas Wentworth Higginson.
- Lt. Cmdr. John White Hallowell, Jr. (January 22, 1909 – July 17, 1980), stockbroker and yachtsman, who married Elizabeth Temple Emmet Lapsley.
- Roger Haydock Hallowell (December 7, 1910 – December 20, 1989), president and chairman of the Reed & Barton Corporation, decorated Silver Star who married Frances Lee Weeks, the first female trustee of the Museum of Fine Arts, delegate to the Republican National Convention in 1964 and 1968, and a daughter of Senator Sinclair Weeks.
- Eleanor Hathaway Hallowell (May 13, 1914 – October 15, 2000), who married Lt. Howard Lapsley, a grandson of Richard Stockton Emmet (1821-1902), and a nephew of Grenville Temple Emmet, Richard Stockton Emmet Jr, William Temple Emmet, Katherine Temple Emmet (wife of New York Supreme Court Justice Martin J. Keogh), and Elizabeth LeRoy Emmet (wife of Nicholas Biddle).
- Phillips Hallowell (born November 13, 1917), anesthesiologist who married Jane Cochrane (February 13, 1928), conservationist and granddaughter of Alexander Cochrane, Scottish-born manufacturer, capitalist, and founder of the Cochrane Chemical Company.

== Death ==
While working in the Boston Chamber of Commerce, Hallowell fell ill with typhoid fever on January 1, 1927, and within 4 days, succumbed to his illness at Philips House, Massachusetts General Hospital on January 5.

Hallowell left his entire estate to his wife, Marian Hathaway Ladd Hallowell, stating in a letter to the New York Times that “omission to provide for my children or for the issue of a deceased child is intentional and is not occasioned by accident or mistake, but my desire to leave all to my wife, and because of my trust in her wisdom and her discretion in the use of her property”.

Hallowell’s funeral took place January 7, 1927, at a Unitarian church in Milton Massachusetts, and was attended by Herbert Hoover, members of the Harvard Corporation and members of the Harvard Overseers.

After his death, The Harvard Crimson paid tribute to Hallowell: "Very rarely men arise with the genius for distinguished public service untouched by the ambition for public recognition. Such a man was John White Hallowell '01. His death in the very midst of manifold activities in the service of Harvard and the nation is a great personal loss. It is, however, the peculiar good fortune of humanity that the work and influence of a man blessed with purity of motives, strength of purpose, and clarity of vision, remain and grow stronger after he has passed away." He is buried in the Milton cemetery with his wife.
