= Norwood Hallowell =

American middle-distance runner

Personal information
- Nationality: American
- Born: 2 November 1909 Milton, Massachusetts, U.S.
- Died: 28 March 1979 (aged 69) Andover, Massachusetts, U.S.
- Height: 183 cm (6 ft 0 in)
- Weight: 66 kg (146 lb)

Sport
- Sport: Athletics
- Event: middle distance
- Club: Harvard Crimson; University of Oxford AC; Achilles Club

Norwood Penrose Hallowell III (2 November 1909 – 28 March 1979) was an American middle distance runner who competed in the 1932 Summer Olympics.

== Early life ==
He was born to Norwood Penrose Hallowell Jr. (1875-1961), a president of Lee, Higginson & Co. and Margaret Ingersoll Bowditch Hallowell (1881-1953), a great-granddaughter of navigator Nathaniel Bowditch. He competed for Harvard after prepping at Milton Academy, and later spent time at Balliol College, one of Oxford's oldest constituent colleges. Hallowell participated in Oxford's track team. While at Harvard, he captained his freshman and varsity cross country teams. His 4m 12.4s mile was the fastest ever stepped by a college student. In 1931, he won the intercollegiate one-mile outdoor track championship. He held both the indoor and outdoor intercollegiate mile titles. He was second marshal of his class and a member of the Hasty Pudding, Institute of 1770, and Porcellian clubs. His relatives, John Hallowell and Frank Hallowell, were also prominent in Harvard Athletics.

== Career ==
Norwood Hallowell won the AAU 1,500 in 1932 and the IC4A mile in 1931. Hallowell was expected to become the first American to win the Olympic 1500-meter event since Mel Sheppard won at London in 1908, but placed sixth in the final. Hallowell was the head of the Drama department at Philips Andover Academy and produced many Shakespearian plays. He had been a member of the Board of Directors of the Theatre Company of Boston. During World War II, he served in the US Navy, attaining the rank of lieutenant commander. He was an executive officer on two ships.

== Personal life ==
Hallowell married Priscilla Choate (1908–1998), a daughter of Joseph H. Choate Jr. on April 3, 1934, in Manhattan, New York City.
