= Thomas Boylston =

American doctor

Thomas Boylston Jr. (January 26, 1644-1695) was a medical doctor in colonial Massachusetts.

== Early life and family ==
Thomas Boylston was born in 1644 in Watertown, Massachusetts to Thomas Boylston Sr. He became a surgeon in 1665 and married Mary Gardner and they had twelve children. One of his sons, Zabdiel, taught medicine by the father, followed his professional steps and grew up to be a prominent physician.

He was surveyor of the Muddy River in 1674 and lived at the western end of the Brookline Reservoir—which was then a marshy meadow—at what is now a private residence. He lived in Brookline, Massachusetts (Muddy River) near what is now Boylston Street on land from his wife's family. He was the great-grandfather of U.S. President John Adams, through his granddaughter, Susanna. His other great-grandson was the merchant Ward Nicholas Boylston.
