= Boykin Mill Complex =

- U.S. National Register of Historic Places
- U.S. Historic district
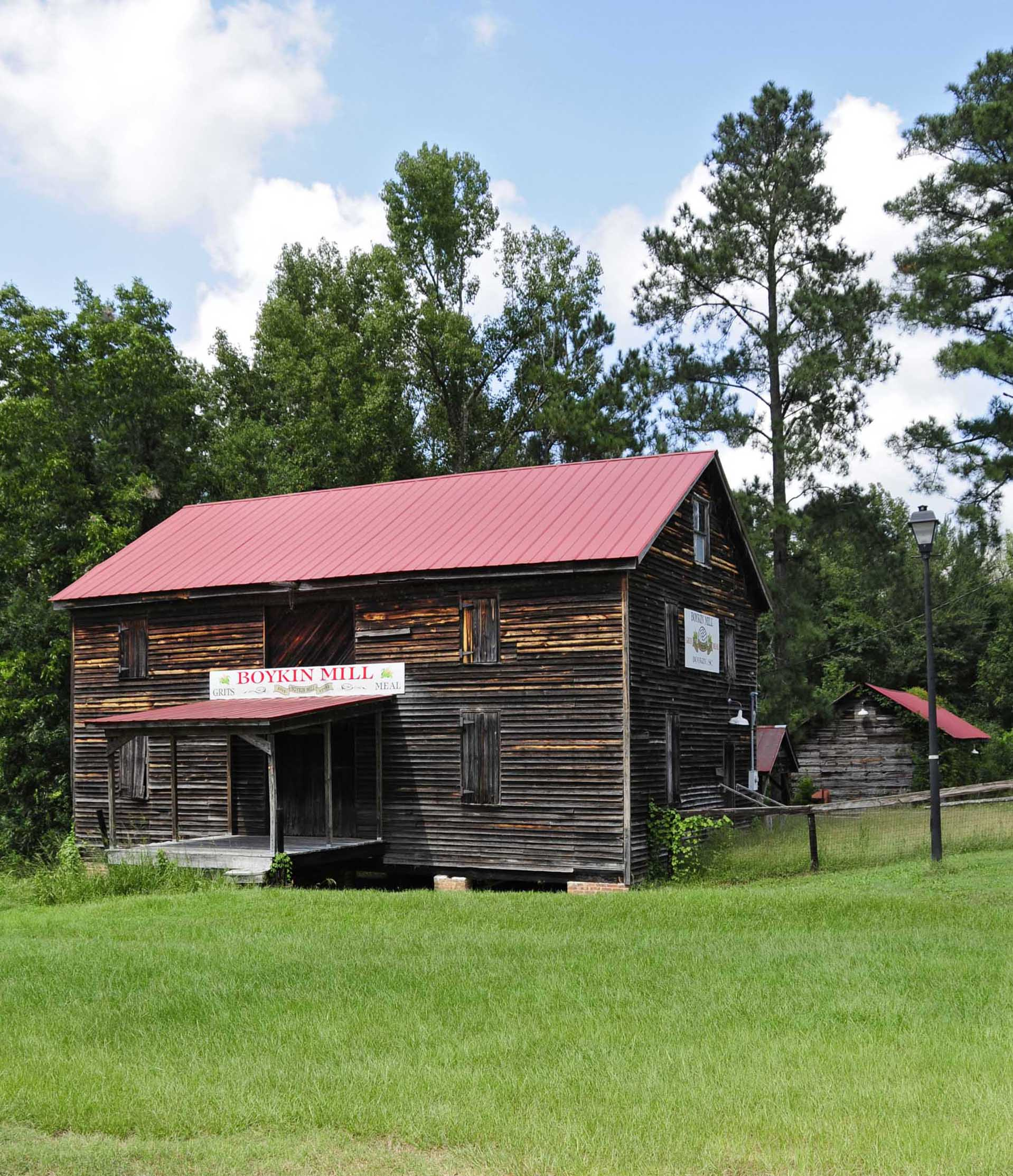
- Boykin Mill Complex, September 2012

- Location within South Carolina Location within the United States
- Location: 8 miles south of Camden at the junction of South Carolina Highway 261 and County Road 2, near Camden, South Carolina
- Coordinates: 34°07′42″N 80°34′17″W
- Area: 886.3 acres (358.7 ha)
- Architectural style: Mid 19th Century Revival, Bungalow/craftsman, Greek Revival
- NRHP reference No.: 92001230
- Added to NRHP: September 10, 1992

Boykin Mill Complex, also known as Mill Tract Plantation, is a national historic district located near Camden, Kershaw County, South Carolina. The district encompasses nine contributing buildings, two contributing sites, and four contributing structures. “Boykin Mill” denotes a community which consists of an old post office (ca. 1875), an old general store (c. 1905), a c. 1905 grist mill, mill pond, mill dam, gates, and canals. The community also includes an early 19th-century Greek Revival style Baptist church (c. 1827), one mid-19th-century residence, three 20th-century residences (c. 1935) built for mill workers, and a smoke house. An American Civil War battle site is also a part of the Boykin Mill community. The Battle of Boykin's Mill took place on April 17, 1865.

It was listed on the National Register of Historic Places in 1992.
