= Mary Fairchild MacMonnies Low =

American painter (1858–1946)

- Self Portrait
- Born: Mary Fairchild; 1858; New Haven, Connecticut
- Died: 1946 (aged 87–88); Bronxville, New York
- Education: St. Louis School of Fine Arts; Académie Julian
- Known for: Painting
- Spouses: Frederick MacMonnies (m. 1888–1909) Will H. Low (m. 1909)

Mary Fairchild MacMonnies Low (1858–1946) was an American painter. She specialized in landscapes, genre paintings, and portraits.

== Biography ==
Mary Fairchild MacMonnies Low was born in 1858 in New Haven, Connecticut. She studied at the St. Louis School of Fine Arts (where she won a three years' scholarship), and in Paris at the Académie Julian and under Carolus Duran. She had her own studio at 11 Impasse du Maine, (now part of Musée Bourdelle).

She married Frederick MacMonnies in 1888 and divorced him in 1909. She married Will H. Low that same year.

== Chicago mural ==
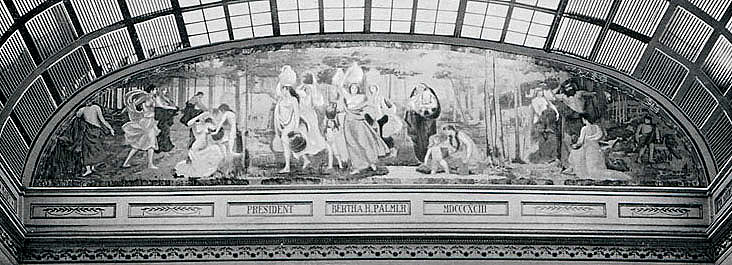
Primitive Woman Decoration for the Woman's Building at the World's Columbian Exposition 1893

In April 1892, Low (then MacMonnies) was approached by Sarah Tyson Hallowell, agent for Bertha Palmer, the prime mover behind the Woman's Building at the World's Columbian Exposition, Chicago, 1893, to paint one of the two mural tympana planned for the building's interior. The other was Modern Woman, by Mary Cassatt. The topic of Low's mural was Primitive Women and it was by all accounts at the time deemed to be the more successful of the two. These were to be the only murals by these two painters. MacMonnies Low also exhibited her work at the Palace of Fine Arts at the 1893 Exposition.

She is represented in the Museum of Rouen, France, where she won a gold medal in 1903 and again in 1911. She also won a gold medal at Dresden in 1902, at Marseille in 1905, and the Julia Shaw prize of the Society of American Artists in 1902. She became an associate of the National Academy of Design.

== Paintings ==
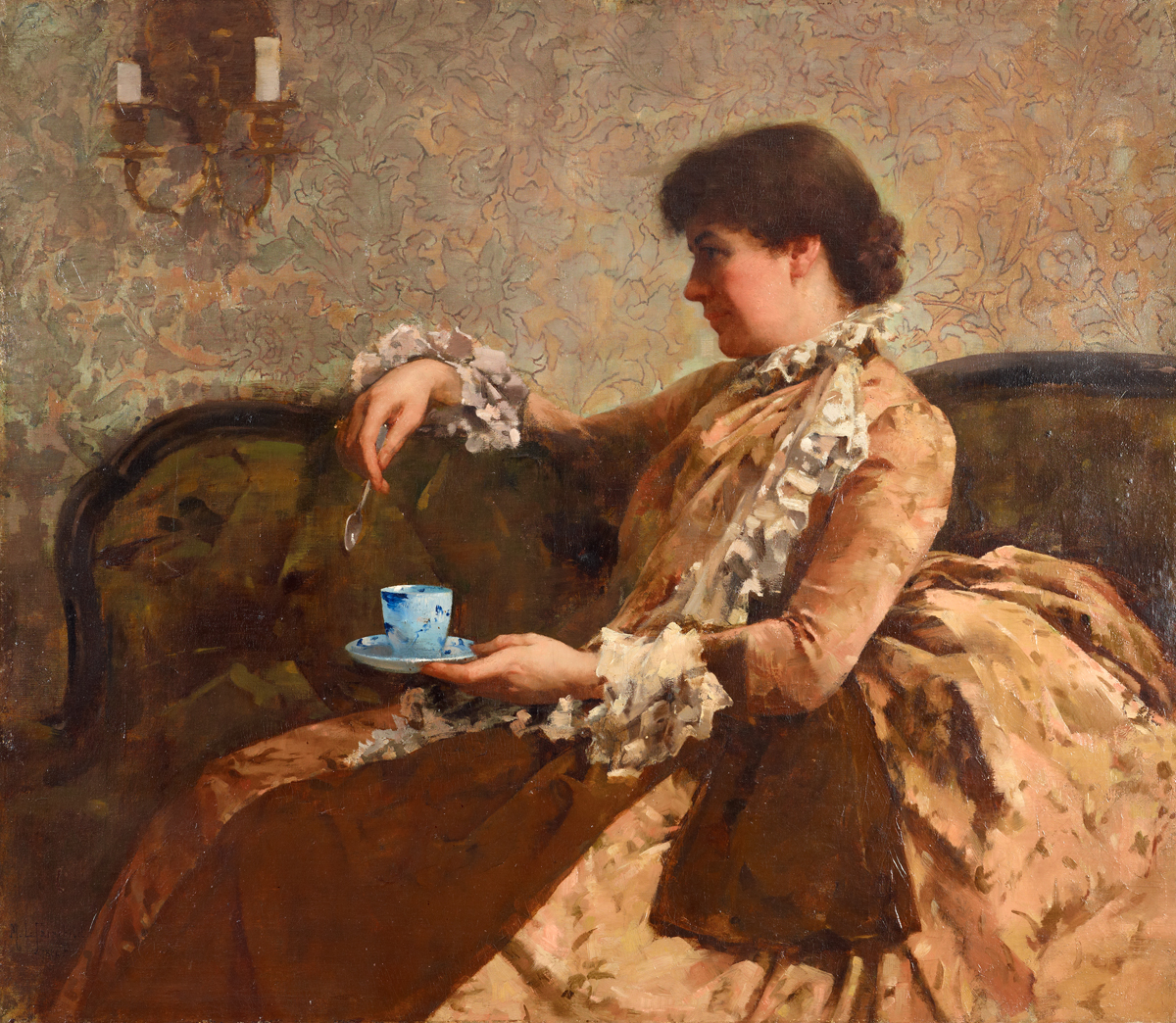
Mary Fairchild MacMonnies, Mademoiselle Sarah Hallowell, 1886

- Gathering Apples, 1866, St. Louis Art Museum, St. Louis, Missouri
- Gathering Flowers, 1890, St. Louis Art Museum, St. Louis, Missouri
- The Breeze, 1895, In the Nursery-Giverny Studio, 1897–98, and C'est la Fete a Bebe, 1879–98, Terra Foundation for American Art, Chicago, Illinois
- Five O'Clock Tea (1891), Sheldon Swope Art Museum. This painting, also known as Tea al Fresco and Entre Voisines, was exhibited at the Chicago Columbian Exposition, where "both the picture and the artist received favorable critical attention."
- "The Green Butterfly"
- "Early Morning Flower Market" (1910)
- "Christmas Eve in the Studio" (1911)
- "Little Women" (1911)
- "Portrait of W.H. Low" (1911), National Academy of Design. Will Low was her husband at that time.
- "Dogwood in Bloom" (1912)
- "Portrait of E. S. D." (1913)
