= A. Wade Boykin =

American psychology professor

Alfred Wade Boykin (1947–2025) was an American psychology professor known for his work in the field of education. He was a member of the faculty of Howard University. He made contributions to the study of academic discrepancies between African American children and Caucasian children. Through his work at the Capstone Institute at Howard University he created plans for implementations of educational reform.

== Education ==
Boykin completed his undergraduate work at Hampton University, graduating in 1968. He went on to get his M.A. and PhD in experimental psychology from the University of Michigan.

== Career ==
After obtaining his PhD from the University of Michigan, Boykin became an associate professor at Cornell, where he gained tenure. In 1994, Boykin took a job at Howard University. From 1994 to 2004 he was the co-director of the National Center for Research on the Education of Students (now called Capstone). Capstone is devoted to researching and implementing school reform and improvement. These plans are based upon the Talent Development model of schooling. After concluding his service to Capstone, Boykin remained at Howard as a professor and director of the graduate psychology program. He was also a fellow at the Institute for Comparative Human Cognition and an adjunct associate professor in the Laboratory of Comparative Human Cognition, both at Rockefeller University. He was a fellow at the Center for Advanced Study in the Behavioral Sciences for a year and was called as a member of the Emergency Commission on Urban Children. He was a member of a National Academy of Education panel and an American Educational Research Association panel. He was also co-director of the Task Force on the Relevance of the Social Sciences to the Black Experience at Yale University. Additionally, he was a member of the National Mathematics Advisory Panel during President George H. W. Bush's term. On this panel he advised the President and Secretary of Education on issues regarding effective mathematic instruction. He was a member of the American Psychological Association's Task Force on Educational Disparities, a panel member for the National Minority Student Achievement Network, a board member for Project Grad USA, and a member of multiple editorial boards.

== Areas of study ==
=== Education ===
Boykin conducted research on education and took part in panels and task forces nationwide. This research occurred during his years at Howard, particularly during his time as a faculty member in the Capstone Institute. The Capstone Institute was established in 1994 for the purpose of expanding the resources available to aid in school reform and to provide assistance in these reforms. The Talent Quest Model of education is a further development of Boykin's concept of the Talent Development Model. Both of these models emphasize the idea that every student can attain academic success as long as he or she is supported properly. The Talent Quest Model has four major pillars: overdetermined success, integrity-based ethos, multiple expected outcomes, and co-construction. Overdetermined success refers to implementing improvement activities and programs in multiple areas of education, which combine to benefit schooling in a way that no single program could. Integrity-based ethos focuses on being respectful and appreciative of the students' backgrounds and past experiences. Multiple expected outcomes refers to quantifying success by measures other than test scores. Co-construction is the practice of ensuring that these programs are tailored to individual schools. Boykin has researched different aspects of the Talent Quest Model and found support for them. For example, "The effects of movement expressiveness in story content and learning context on the analogical reasoning performance of African American children" (2001) and "The comparative influence of individual, peer tutoring, and communal learning contexts on the text recall of African American children" (2000) were both studies that provided support for specific aspects of the Talent Quest Model. Additionally, Boykin contributed to "Intelligence: knowns and unknowns" (1996) which was a paper commissioned by the American Psychological Association to respond to the book the Bell Curve, a book that argued for the genetic basis of intelligence. The publication of the book resulted in a great deal of debate. In order to facilitate productive, non-politicized conversation about the topic, the APA assembled a task force to assess the facts about intelligence. The paper addressed existing theories on intelligence, how it can be tested, what intelligence test scores have been shown to correlated with, the relationship of genetics to intelligence, the relationship of the environment to intelligence, and group differences in scores. From their review of the literature, the task force asserted that while genetics and the environment are the two most prominent deciding factors in intelligence, very little is truly known about how these factors go about shaping intelligence. Additionally, they stated that the genetic hypothesis (as used in the Bell Curve) does not explain the intelligence test score differences between racial groups. Boykin also collaborated on studies combining culture and education, two such studies were "In search of cultural themes and their expressions in the dynamics of classroom life" (2005) and "Culture in the sanctioned classroom practices of elementary school teachers serving low-income African American students" (2006).

=== Culture ===
In addition to combining culture and education in his studies, Boykin also studied culture on its own. Boykin was interested in researching and developing appreciation for African American culture. Two of these studies are "Examining cultural socialization within African American and European American households" (2008) and "Communalism: conceptualization and measurement of an Afrocultural social orientation" (1997). In addition to general studies of culture, Boykin also studied the impact of culture on attitudes. "Culture-based perceptions of academic achievement among low-income elementary students" (2005) is one such study in which Boykin examines the mediating effect of cultural learning orientations on opinions of academic achievement. This work takes on the task of arguing with those who claim that African American students have negative attitudes towards academic achievement. The study involved low-income African American and Caucasian fifth grade students. The students were given a scenario in which academic achievement occurred, each scenario represented a different learning orientation: individualistic, competitive, verve, or communal. The children were then asked questions that evaluated their attitudes towards the scenarios. Boykin and his colleagues found that African-American students supported academic achievement in the scenarios that represented the orientations of verve and communalism. These same students held negative perspectives when the academic achievement occurred through competitive or individualistic means. Previous findings have asserted that African American children have negative views of academic achievement, but this study shows that these views are not of the achievement itself, but of the means by which it is attained. Additionally, this study demonstrates how pervasive cultural learning orientations are in the lives of children. Boykin and his colleagues go on to assert that integrating communal and verve orientations into public schools might be a good way to make African American children feel more positive about academic achievement. This study captures the type of research and contributions that Boykin was known for; he assessed a problem and made suggestions to remedy it.

=== Methods ===
Boykin also conducted studies on specific methods and constructs, particularly those used in educational research. "Analysis of complexity preference in Head Start nursery school children" (1971) is a study that examines the meaning of findings regarding children's choice of more complex stimulus, which is a factor that was used in studies of the efficacy of the Jump Start program. Similarly, Boykin questioned the role of context in standardized testing in a 1977 study.

== Publications ==
- Boykin AW. The role of cultural factors in school relevant cognitive functioning synthesis of findings on cultural contexts, cultural orientations, individual differences (SuDoc ED 1.310/2:441880) ASIN B00011541I
- Boykin AW. Reformulating educational reform: Toward the proactive schooling of African American children (ERIC reports) ASIN B0006RO1CA
- Boykin AW. The role of cultural factors in school relevant cognitive functioning description of home environmental factors, cultural orientations, and learning preferences (SuDoc ED 1.310/2:441059) ASIN B0001152X8

== Awards and honors ==
- 2007 Faculty Senate Exemplary Teaching Award, Howard University
- Spencer Fellow of the National Academy of Education
- Distinguished Scholar, American Educational Research Association on Minorities
- Dalmos Jones Distinguished Visiting Professor, City University of New York Graduate Center
- Visiting Mellon Scholar, Teacher's College, Columbia University
- Distinguished Alumni Award, Department of Psychology, Hampton University
