= Sarah Tyson Hallowell =

American art curator

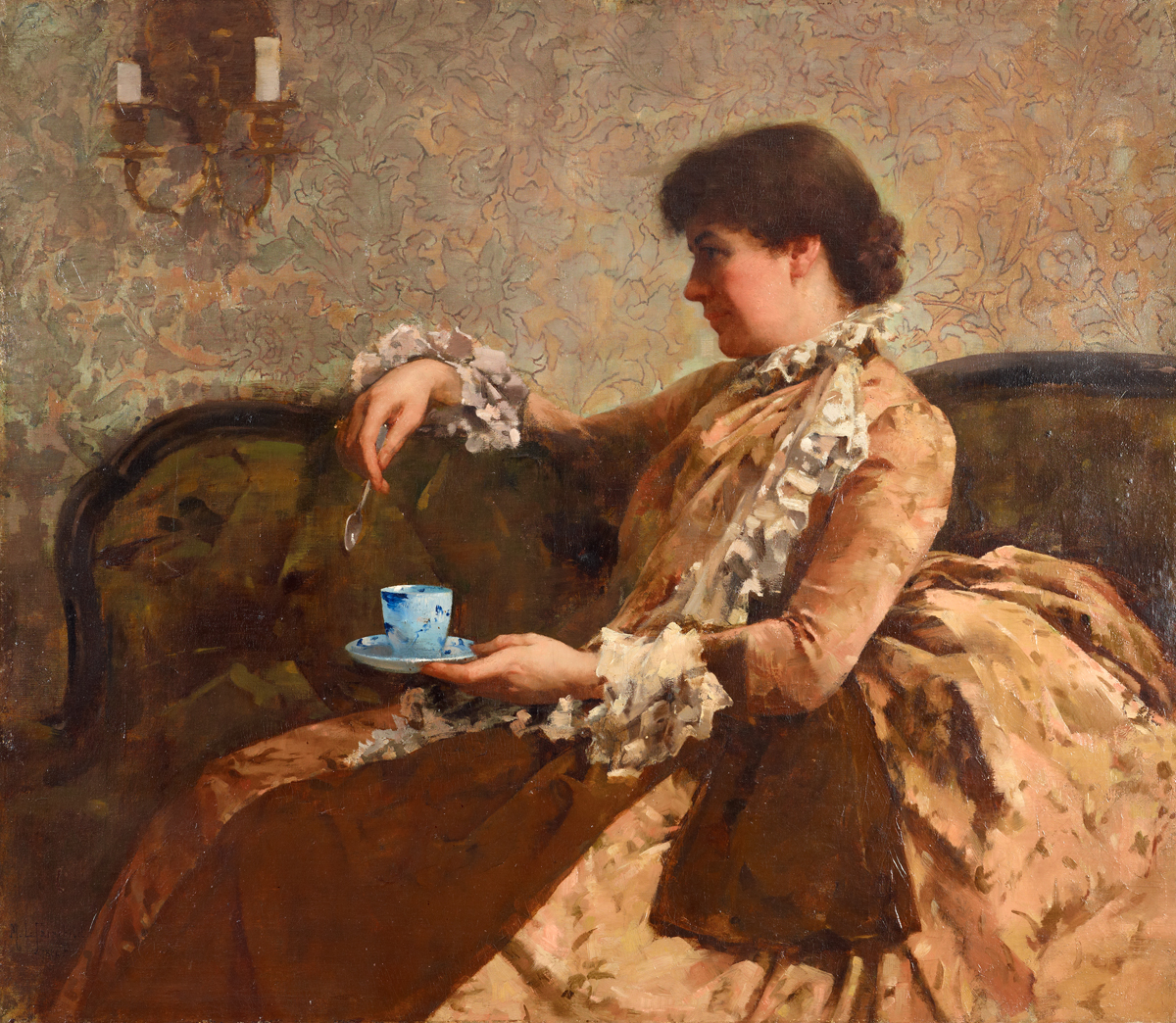
- Mademoiselle Sarah Hallowell, 1886, by Mary Fairchild MacMonnies
- Born: December 7, 1846; Philadelphia, Pennsylvania, US
- Died: July 19, 1924 (aged 77); Moret-sur-Loing
- Occupation: American art curator
- Known for: Introducing Impressionism to the United States, volunteer work during World War I

Sarah Tyson Hallowell or Sara Tyson Hallowell (December 7, 1846 – July 19, 1924) was an American art curator in the years between the Civil War and World War I. She curated a number of major exhibitions in Chicago, arranged the loan exhibition of French Art at the World's Columbian Exposition in Chicago, and worked with Bertha Palmer (1849–1918) to organize the murals for the women's pavilion for the fair. She then moved to Paris, where she served as agent for the Art Institute of Chicago. During World War I she and her niece Harriet Hallowell (1873–1943) volunteered at a small hospital. She lived in France until her death in 1924.

== Early life ==
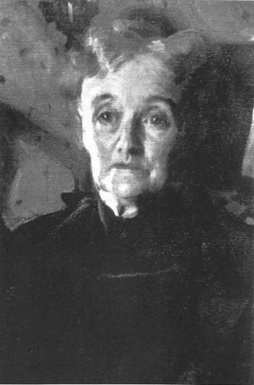
Anders Zorn, Mary Morris Tyson Hallowell, 1893

Sarah Tyson Hallowell was born in Philadelphia, Pennsylvania on December 7, 1846. (Note: Oxford lists her year of birth as 1947. Sarah Hallowell gave her year of birth as 1946 on her Passport.) Her parents were Caleb W. Hallowell, of the Hallowell Family, and Mary Morris Tyson Hallowell, who were married on June 11, 1840. Caleb Hallowell was a merchant in Philadelphia, who was born in 1815 and died of tuberculosis in 1858. Her mother was born in 1820 and died in 1913 in Moret, France.

Mary and Caleb were both born into the Quaker (Society of Friends) faith, but by the time of their marriage Caleb "had left the meeting". Mary was then "read out of meeting for marrying out of unity," meaning that she was temporarily or permanently disowned by the faith. Their children continued to have the influence of the Friends through their families.

The Hallowells had six children born between 1841 and 1854. Listed chronologically, they are: Francis Perot, Morris Lewis, Lewis Morris, Sara Tyson, Marshall Tyson, and Elizabeth Tyson. Even though the family were Quakers, three of her brothers, Morris, Francis and Lewis, fought in the Civil War for the Union Army. Each of them sustained injuries and/or were sick during the war. During the Civil War, Mary played a leadership role in Tennessee serving Union Army soldiers and with others raised funds for the care of the sick and wounded Union troops for the Sanitary Commission in Philadelphia.

Hallowell's nephew was the American artist George Hawley Hallowell (1872-1926) of Boston, and her niece, who lived with her in France, was the painter Harriet Hallowell.

Her grandfather was Elisha Tyson, who was a Quaker active in social and political causes. She descended through her mother's lineage from Christopher Marshall who came to the United States from Ireland and settled in Pennsylvania. He was a Committee of Safety of Pennsylvania member. Based her relationship to Marshall, she was Daughters of the American Revolution. Mary, her mother, and her niece Harrier were members of the Paris, France chapter of the Daughters of the American Revolution. John Hallowell (died 1706), a Quaker from England, was her father's ancestor.

== Career ==
Hallowell worked in Paris and Chicago as an "influential" adviser and organizer of art exhibits.

=== Early career ===
Impressionism examples

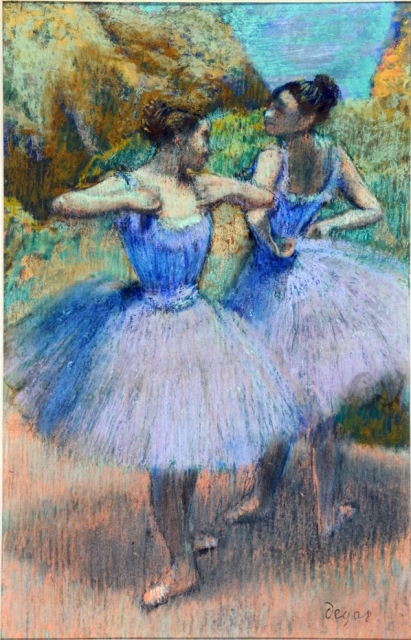
Edgar Degas, "Les Danseuses mauves"

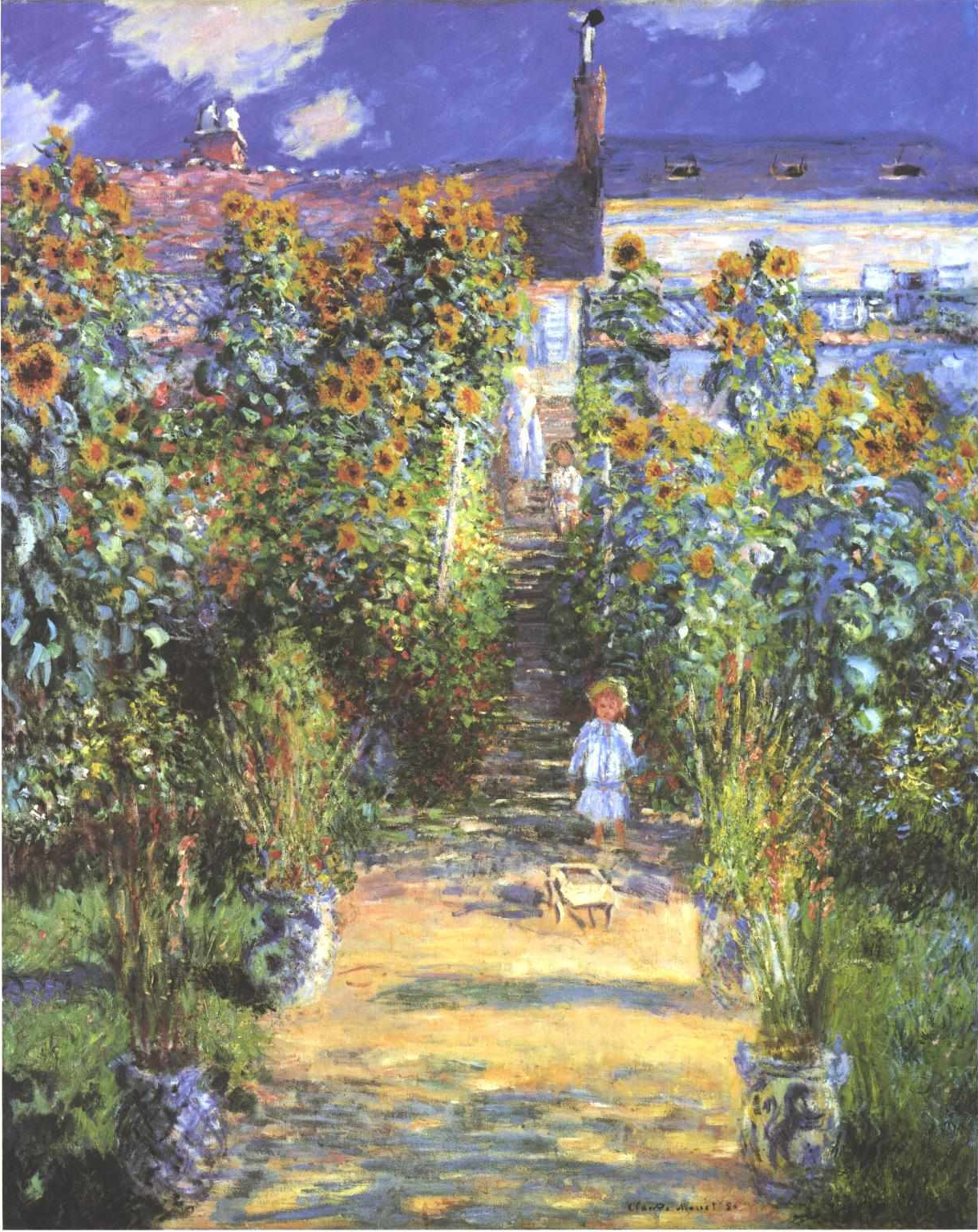
Claude Monet, Garden of the artist at Vetheuil

At the age of 20 she moved with her mother to Chicago and developed a career as a modern art exhibition organizer. In 1870, she lived with four of her five siblings in her mother's house.

Hallowell traveled to European art centers to arrange for works of art for the Inter-State Industrial Expositions in Chicago and worked with William Merritt Chase, James McNeill Whistler, John Singer Sargent, and other Barbizon and European schooled artists. In 1878 she organized the Inter-State Industrial Exposition of Chicago. She popularized Impressionist art in the city with exhibition of the works of Degas, Monet, Pissarrol Alfred Sisley, and Pierre-Auguste Renoir in the 1890 Inter-State show.

She was an agent for art collectors in Chicago, including Bertha Palmer. Although some recent sources credit Hallowell with helping to found the Palette Club of Chicago, which was first called the Bohemian Art Club, there are no contemporaneous references to support this. She was also a member of the Antiquarian Society. Hallowell helped to promote the development of the Art Institute of Chicago. She had increasing responsibility in management of exhibitions. Carolyn Kinder Carr, author of Sara T. Hallowell: Forsaking Plain for Fancy, stated that she was the first woman in exhibition management. She was said to have been among a group of women who were students of the School of the Art Institute of Chicago.

=== World's Exposition, 1893 ===
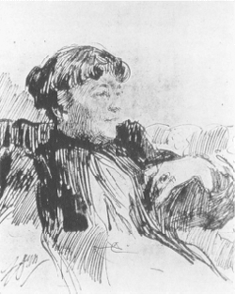
Anders Zorn, Sarah Tyson Hallowell, 1893, The National Portrait Gallery, Washington, D.C.

Hallowell was one of the agents and then assistant director of the Department of Fine Arts for the World's Columbian Exposition of 1893 in Chicago. Initially she had applied for the position of director. At that point she had a decade organizing large exhibitions and developing important relationships within the art community. Hallowell had powerful social and political backers who lobbied for the role for her. Although she was an otherwise a "strong candidate" she was not made chief. Author Carolyn Kinder Carr said, "As newspaper accounts of the day made clear, her gender rendered her ineligible for this high-profile job."

Hallowell was responsible for collecting 19th-century European art and identifying candidates for painting of wall murals by women artists. Working predominantly from Paris and at the request of Berthe Palmer, Hallowell identified Mary MacMonnies and Mary Cassatt, who became one of her friends in the 1890s. Soap Bubbles by Elizabeth Gardner was one of the works selected by Hallowell.

Hallowell, who met Rodin in the early 1890s when arranging for art works for the exposition, was to become his "best American friend" in the 19th century.

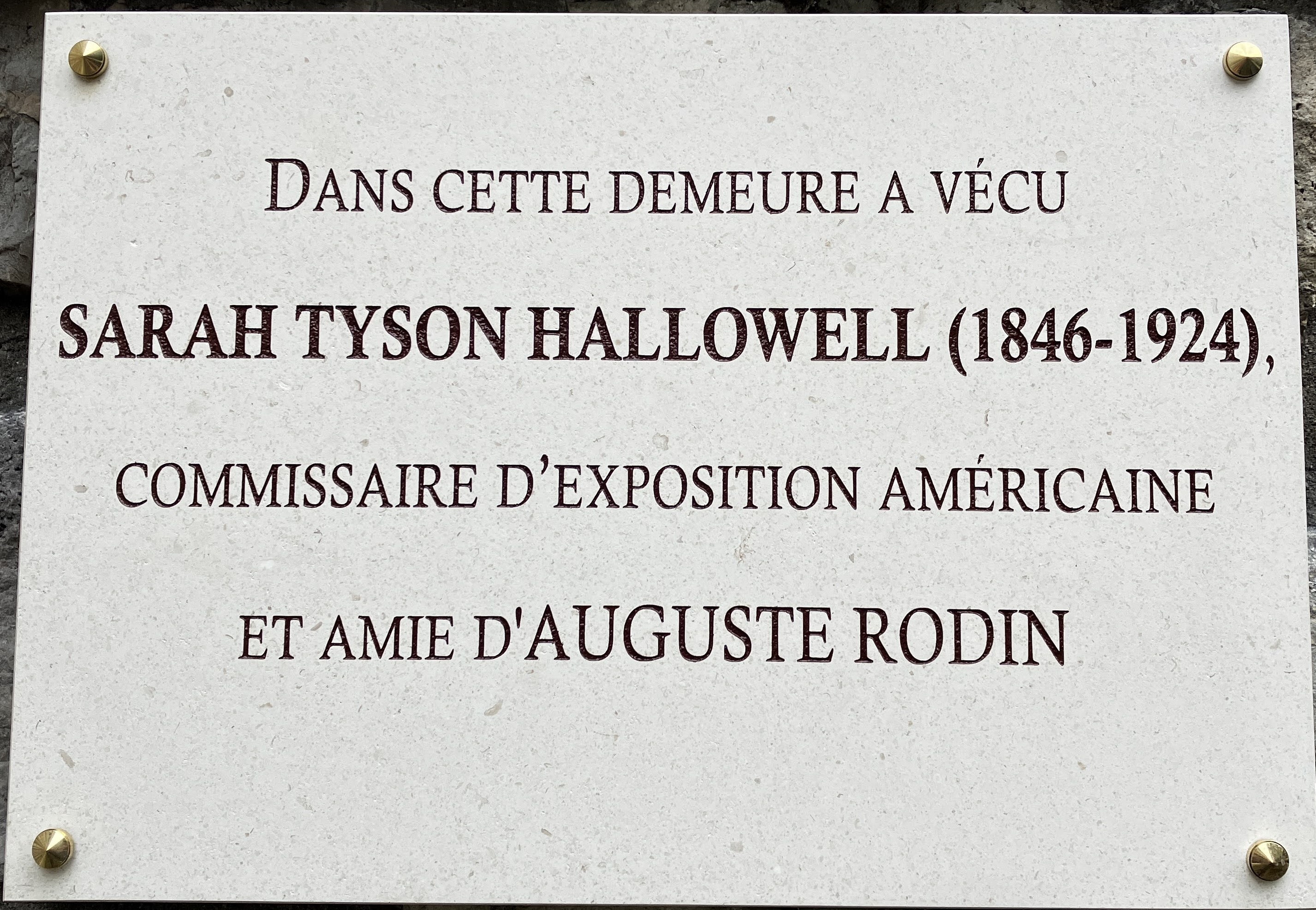
Memorial plaque for Sarah Tyson Halloway in Moret-sur-Loing

=== France ===
No woman, perhaps, is better or more happily known to the world's foremost artists than Sara Hallowell.

— New York Times (1905)

In 1894 Hallowell moved to Paris and lived in Europe thereafter. She worked primarily for the Art Institute of Chicago as an agent. She returned to the United States to "keep in touch with America's wonderful school of landscape painters" in Chicago, Philadelphia, Pittsburgh, Boston and New York. Whereas, in France, American painters often concentrated on portraits and figure paintings. She also included the works of French artists, like Rodin and Robert Henri, in those she personally selected and sent to the Art Institute.

She lived in Paris with her mother and niece. Around the turn of the century they also lived in the small town of Moret-sur-Loing, which is located six miles from Fontainebleau.

She stopped working for the Art Institute of Chicago when World War I broke out.

== War relief work ==
Sarah and her niece Harriet lived in Moret during World War I and volunteered at the local hospital. (Note: Because the war was so close to their home, a small hospital was set up in Moret-sur-Loing, "Hôpital Aux No. 26" (English: Auxiliary Hospital Number 26), according to the online "Forum Histoire 1914–1918". It was listed in French records as HA n° 26 Moret-sur-Loing - Asile de vieillards - 40 lits - SSBM - Fonctionne du (2 août 1914 au ?) According to U.S. Department of State Records from the Paris Embassy between 1904 and 1924, the hospital opened in August 1914 and was active throughout the war.) They established a center in their home for crocheting clothing for soldiers and refugees. Injured soldiers and local residents assisted in making the clothing. Their efforts, which continued after the war, were supported by donations from their cousin, T. Morris Perot in Pennsylvania and others.

== Death ==
Sarah Tyson Hallowell died July 19, 1924, in Moret-sur-Loing, where she is buried.

== See also ==
- Salon (Paris)
