= Lee, Higginson & Co. =

American investment bank

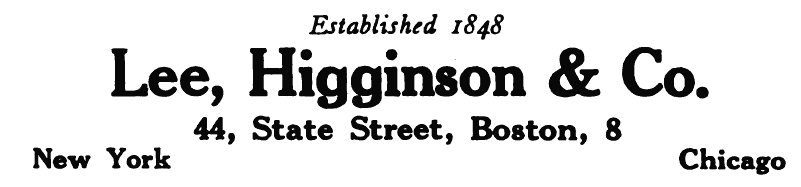
Lee, Higginson & Co. logo c.1922

Lee, Higginson & Co. was a Boston-based investment bank established in 1848 that was the home of many members of the Boston Brahmin establishment. The bank collapsed in the Swedish match scandal in 1932 while under the leadership of Jerome Davis Greene. The bank helped finance the growth of General Motors during the nascent phase of the American automobile industry.

Following the collapse, the partners of the firm reorganized as Lee Higginson Corporation. The corporation was later acquired by Hayden, Stone Inc. in 1966. The former headquarters of Lee, Higginson in lower Manhattan, built 1928, is now the private Léman Manhattan Preparatory School.

== History ==
On May 1, 1848, lawyer John Clarke Lee of Salem and merchant George Higginson of Boston established Lee, Higginson & Co. with offices at 47 State Street in Boston. Lee's son, George Cabot Lee (the father of Alice Hathaway Lee, first wife of President Theodore Roosevelt) joined the firm in November 1848 and was admitted as a partner on April 1, 1853. Higginson's son, Henry Lee Higginson, joined the firm as a partner in 1868. In September 1900, George Cabot Lee Jr., grandson of John Clarke Lee, joined the firm and was admitted as a junior partner. He later served as president of the Lee, Higginson Safe Deposit Company.

During the firm's heyday, it financed the development of the Atchison, Topeka & Santa Fe Railway among other Western railroads, developed the Calumet and Hecla Mine in Michigan and helped put together General Electric in 1892. In 1910, it led the financing of the then struggling General Motors.

In 1930, the firm formed a general partnership in France known as Lee, Higginson et Cie, with offices at 10 Rue Volney in Paris. The firm was made up of the partners of Lee, Higginson and Paul G. Courtney, who lived in Paris. After two and a half years, the Paris office was closed, Courtney returned to New York where he became affiliated with Clark, Dodge & Co. before returning to Lee, Higginson in 1935.

Between 1928 and 1932, the firm underwrote millions of dollars' worth of Ivar Kreuger's efforts to "corner the international matchmaking market." After Kreuger's manipulations were uncovered, the firm, among others, was stuck with the debt.

=== Lee Higginson Corporation ===
In July 1932, following the Swedish match scandal, the Lee Higginson Corporation was formed "with capital from sources outside the partnership of Lee, Higginson Co." to do business in New York, Boston and Chicago" under the direction of executive vice president N. Penrose Hallowell (son of Gen. Norwood Penrose Hallowell). The new corporation was headquartered in the banking offices of Lee, Higginson Co. in New York. The companies three main offices were managed by vice presidents in the respective cities, with Edward N. Jesup in New York, Charles E. Cotting in Boston, and Charles H. Schweppe in Chicago. Barrett Wendell Jr. and William M. Blair were connected with the corporation in Chicago, all of whom where partners in Lee, Higginson & Co. George C. Lee Jr.'s son, James J. Lee, became a vice president of the Lee Higginson Corporation in New York from 1932 (he left the firm in 1952 to join W. E. Hutton & Co. as a partner).

In 1933, the firm sold its twelve-story office at 35-41 Broad Street, "regarded as one of the most attractive in the financial district", to the New York Stock Exchange. The building had been erected in 1928 which they occupied once it had been completed. In 1935, former Lee, Higginson bankers, William M. Blair and Francis Bonner, founded investment Blair Bonner & Company, which today is William Blair & Company. Another partner, from 1928 to 1935, was George Murnane who in early 1935 went on to co-found Monnet, Murnane & Co. together with Jean Monnet. In 1940, Hallowell was elected chairman before being elected president in 1942.

In 1954, the firm led a syndicate that bought $10,000,000 of 3.25% first mortgage bonds from Columbus and Southern Ohio Electric Company. In 1955, Richard de la Chapelle was elected president of the corporation to succeed Charles E. Cutting, who was elected chairman replacing retiring chairman Hallowell. In 1958, the firm announced it was moving from 40 Wall Street to 20 Broad Street, next to the Stock Exchange Building. In June 1961, the firm offered 350,000 capital shares of the Wrather Corporation (which owned Disneyland and other entertainment investments) at $10 a share . In November 1961, the firm elected Arne Fuglestad and Robert E. Niebling as vice presidents, followed by Samuel Clarendon Myer in 1964. During the Kennedy Slide of 1962, the firm "lost heavily, then was all but ignored by investors in the trading resurgence that followed." In October 1964, de le Chapelle resigned to join Dean Witter & Co. as a partner. He was succeeded by Frederick H. Schroeder.

=== 1966 merger ===
In June 1966, the Lee Higginson Corporation was reportedly in talks to merge with fellow New York Stock Exchange member McDonnell & Co. The Corporation's president, Schroeder, denied it was considering any merger proposals.

In July 1966, however, the directors of the Lee Higginson Corp. accepted in principle a proposal for its acquisition by Hayden, Stone Inc. By August 1966, the firm, including its name, offices and assets in Boston, New York, Chicago and four other cities, were sold to Hayden, Stone Inc., who discontinued the use of the name Lee Higginson.
