= Anna Hallowell =

American anti-slavery activist (1831–1905)

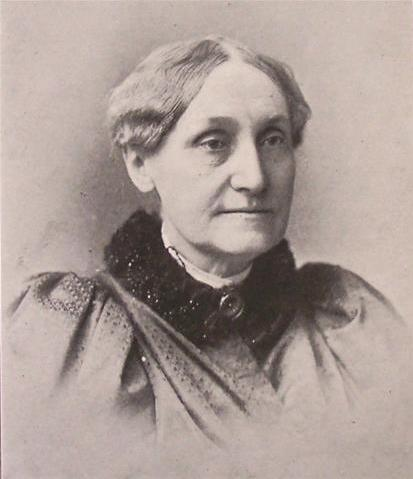
- Born: November 1, 1831; Philadelphia, Pennsylvania, U.S.
- Died: April 6, 1905 (aged 73); Philadelphia, Pennsylvania, U.S.
- Resting place: Laurel Hill Cemetery, Philadelphia, Pennsylvania, U.S.
- Parent(s): Morris Longstreth Hallowell; Hannah Penrose
- Relatives: Norwood Penrose Hallowell (brother); Edward Needles Hallowell (brother)

Anna Hallowell (November 1, 1831 – April 6, 1905) was an American education reformer, feminist, anti slavery activist, and welfare worker.

== Early life ==
Anna Hallowell was born to Morris Longstreth Hallowell, a silk importer, and Hannah Penrose Hallowell in Philadelphia in 1831. She came from a Hicksite Quaker family and was the eldest of seven siblings. Her parents were anti-slavery proponents who risked their business speaking against the institution. Hallowell began working against slavery which led her to focus on eliminating poverty through education. In her twenties Hallowell was serving as secretary and on the board of the Home for Destitute Colored Children. 1859 saw Hallowell attending the trial of Daniel Dangerfield, a fugitive being tried under the Fugitive Slave Act. Hallowell's brothers, including Norwood Penrose Hallowell and Edward Needles Hallowell, served in the Union army during the American Civil War and she turned their home into a hospital.

== Career ==
In the 1870s Hallowell was working with those freed people who arrived in Philadelphia and with others she established the Society for Organizing Charitable Relief and Repressing Mendicancy in 1878, with Hallowell on the committee for the Care and Education of Dependent Children. The organization became known as Society for Organizing Charity and the committee was reorganized in 1883 as the Children's Aid Society with Hallowell as one of its first directors. Such exposure caused Hallowell to conclude that the solution to poverty was through educating the children. From 1879 Hallowell worked to establish free kindergartens in impoverished areas. She arranged for the Sub-Primary School Society to assist with funding of kindergartens in the city and by 1887 there were 27 kindergartens when the Board of Public Education took them over.

Hallowell became the first women chosen to be a member of the board of public education where she remained for fourteen years. There she ensured training courses for teachers. Hallowell also worked to emphasize the need to appoint women to roles such as inspectors of prisons, hospitals and asylums. In 1882 she was made chair of the committee of women visitors for Philadelphia county, a position she held for seventeen years.

Hallowell took on the complete overhaul of the James Forten School in 1890 turning it from a by then poorly maintained building into a school which more than doubled in size in ten years, with new teachers, courses and structure. The curriculum after her involvement included art, music, carpentry and domestic science.

Aware of her position in society, Hallowell used her status to found the Civic club, aimed at organizing upper-class women into a power for social reform. She worked with Mary E. Mumford to found the club in 1893.

Hallowell died at her home, 908 Clinton Street in Philadelphia on April 6, 1905, of heart disease and bronchitis. She was interred at Laurel Hill Cemetery in Philadelphia.
