= Harriet Hallowell =

American-French painter

- Born: June 15, 1873; Boston, Massachusetts
- Died: 1943; Moret-sur-Loing
- Known for: Painter
- Movement: Miniature painting

Harriet Hallowell (1873–1943) was an expatriate American artist who lived in France for fifty years. She was born in Boston to a Quaker family. During World War I she remained in France and volunteered at a hospital. The hospital was near the home she shared with her aunt Sarah Tyson Hallowell, located in the village of Moret-sur-Loing, which borders the Forest of Fontainebleau.

Because of her war relief efforts on behalf of the French and Allied soldiers, the French government awarded her the Légion d'honneur in 1930.

== Early life ==
Harriet Hallowell was born in Boston on June 15, 1873. Her father was architect Lewis Morris Hallowell (1844–1909) and her mother was Harriet Hawley Hallowell.

Harriet had a brother born in 1871, George Hawley Hallowell who was an artist. He died in 1926 and the following year Harriet donated one of his works, St. George and the Dragon, after Carpaccio, to the Fogg Museum of the Harvard Art Museums.

== Artistic career ==
=== United States ===
Hallowell, known for her work as a miniature painter, may have had her work exhibited in Boston in 1893 before her departure for France in 1894.

=== France ===
Hallowell worked as an artist and had a studio in Paris. She often lived with her aunt, Sarah Tyson Hallowell and grandmother, Mary M. Hallowell in Paris and the small town of Moret-sur-Loing, which is located six miles from Fontainebleu.

Her works were exhibited in the mid-1890s in France. The Hallowells may have taken the Moret-sur-Loing house by or about 1900, because the painting she sent to the Art Institute of Chicago in 1901 bears that address. She exhibited Near Fountainbleu at the Pennsylvania Academy of Fine Arts in 1901.

== War relief work ==
Harriet and her Aunt Sarah lived in Moret during World War I and volunteered at the local hospital. (Note: Because the war was so close to their home, a small hospital was set up in Moret-sur-Loing, "Hôpital Auxiliaire No. 26" (English: Auxiliary Hospital Number 26), according to the online "Forum Histoire 1914–1918". It was listed in French records as HA n° 26 Moret-sur-Loing - Asile de vieillards - 40 lits - SSBM - Fonctionne du (2 août 1914 au ?) According to U.S. Department of State Records from the Paris Embassy between 1904 and 1924, the hospital opened in August 1914 and was active throughout the war.) They established a center in their home for crocheting clothing for soldiers and refugees. Injured soldiers and local residents assisted in making the clothing. Their efforts, which continued after the war, were supported by donations from their cousin, T. Morris Perot in Pennsylvania and others.

The French government honored her with the Croix d'Honneur for her war work in 1930.

== Later life ==
Harriet Hallowell's aunt Sara died in July 1924 and she inherited her aunt's estate. While not rich in cash, the estate had important works of art, with paintings by artists such as Anders Zorn (1860–1920) and two works of sculpture that were made and gifts by Auguste Rodin (1840–1917), her aunt's friend. She continued to paint and remained active with the Paris chapter of the American Artists Professional League. She exhibited her work with the American Women's Club of Paris and at the annual Salon.

Beginning in 1933, Hallowell experienced financial difficulties due to the devaluing of her French stocks and the Depression, which became "desperate" during World War II. As German troops in the area, she needed to move often to avoid them. She rejected offers from her relatives in the United States to leave France.

Hallowell died in 1943 in her Moret home.

== Memberships and affiliations ==
- American Artists Professional League, Paris Chapter
- Daughters of the American Revolution
