= Susanna Boylston =

Mother of 2nd US President, John Adams

- Born: March 5, 1708; Brookline, Province of Massachusetts Bay
- Died: April 21, 1797 (aged 89); Quincy, Massachusetts, U.S.
- Occupation: socialite
- Spouses: John Adams Sr. (m. 1734; died 1761) John Hall (m. 1766; died 1780)
- Children: 3, including John Adams
- Relatives: Nicholas Boylston (cousin); Zabdiel Boylston (uncle)

Susanna Boylston Adams Hall (March 5, 1708 – April 21, 1797) was an early American socialite. She was also the mother of the second U.S. president, John Adams and the paternal grandmother of the sixth president, John Quincy Adams.

== Early life ==
Susanna was born in Brookline, Province of Massachusetts Bay, on March 5, 1708. Her parents were Peter Boylston (c. 1673–1743) and Anne (née White) Boylston (1685–1772). Her paternal grandparents were Dr. Thomas Boylston and Mary (née Gardner) Boylston, and her maternal grandparents were Benjamin White and Susanna (née Cogswell) White.

The Boylstons were one of the most respectable families in New England and among her relatives was cousin Ward Nicholas Boylston, a benefactor of Harvard College, and uncle Zabdiel Boylston, the celebrated physician who performed the first surgical operation by an American physician and was known for inoculating hundreds of people in Boston during a severe smallpox outbreak. Cousin Mary Boylston was mother of Mary Hallowell, wife of Chief Justice of Upper Canada John Elmsley.

== Personal life ==
In 1734, Susanna was married to John Adams Sr. (1691–1761). She is among the least well known of the famous Adams family, for her name appears infrequently in the large body of Adams writings. Historian David McCullough notes that no writings of hers survive, though it is known that others would often read to her, suggesting that she might have been illiterate. In his memoirs, John Adams wrote that "as my parents were both fond of reading...I was very early taught to read at home.". Together, John and Susanna were parents of the following children:

- John Adams (1735–1826), the 2nd president of the United States.
- Peter Boylston Adams (1738–1823), a farmer, militia captain of Braintree, Massachusetts.
- Elihu Adams (1741–1775), a company commander in the militia during the American Revolution who died from dysentery.

Five years after the death of her first husband, she married Lt. John Hall (1698–1780) on October 17, 1766. Reportedly, Lt. Hall did not get along with her grown children. Susanna died in Quincy, Massachusetts, on April 21, 1797, around a month into her son's presidency.
