= Norwood Penrose Hallowell =

Union Army officer (1839–1914)

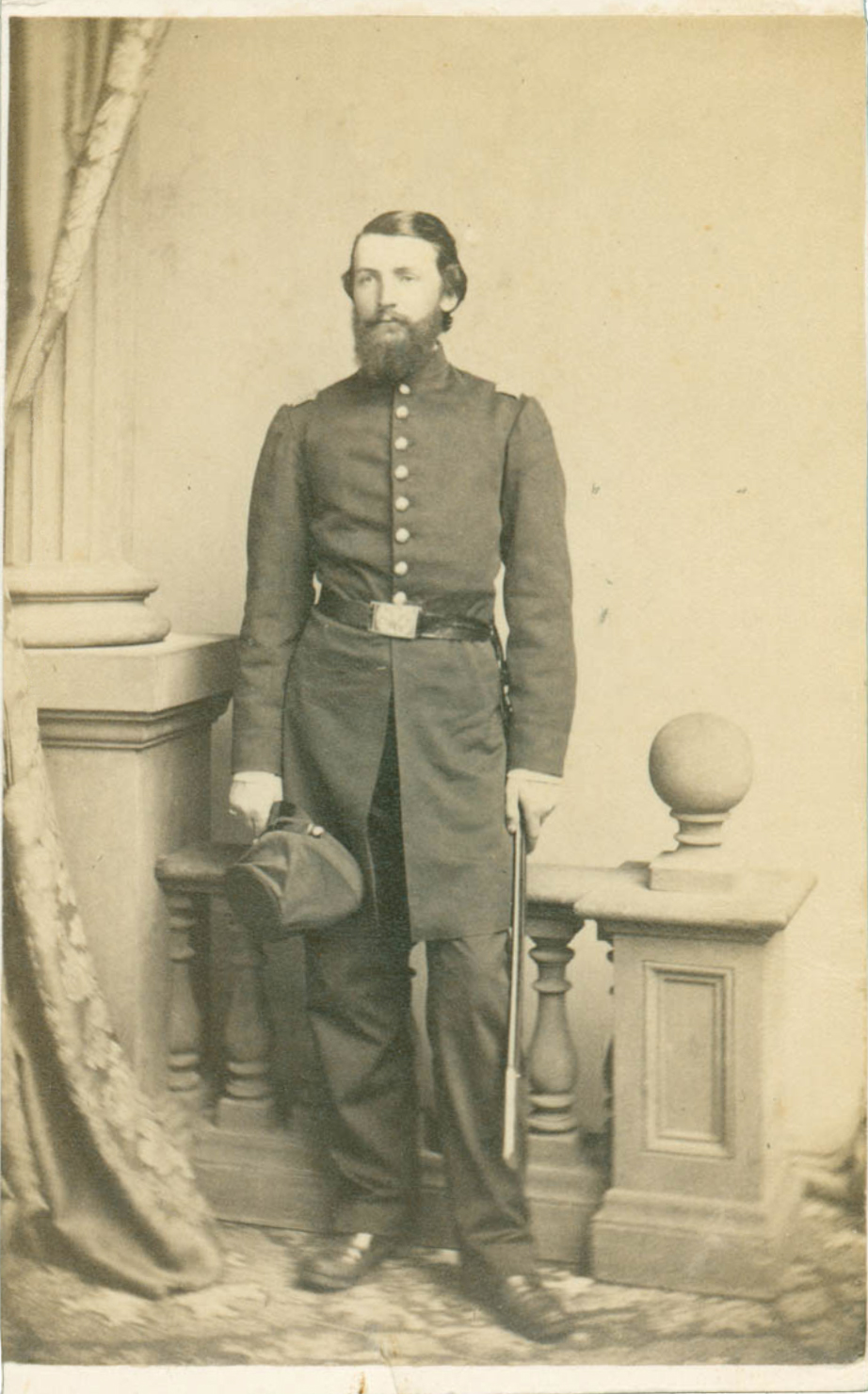
- Hallowell as a captain in the Union Army, 1862
- Born: April 13, 1839; Philadelphia, Pennsylvania, US
- Died: April 11, 1914 (aged 74); Medford, Massachusetts, US
- Burial place: Mount Auburn Cemetery; Cambridge, Massachusetts
- Military career
- Allegiance: United States
- Service years: 1861 – 1863
- Rank: Colonel
- Units: 20th Massachusetts Volunteer Infantry; 54th Massachusetts Volunteer Infantry
- Commands: 55th Massachusetts Volunteer Infantry
- Conflicts: American Civil War: Battle of Ball's Bluff; Battle of Glendale; Battle of Antietam; Second Battle of Charleston Harbor

Norwood Penrose "Pen" Hallowell (April 13, 1839 – April 11, 1914) was an officer in the Union Army during the American Civil War. One of three brothers to serve with distinction during the war, he and his brother Edward Needles Hallowell both became commanders of the first all-black regiments. He is also remembered for his close friendship with and influence upon future Supreme Court justice Oliver Wendell Holmes Jr., who was his classmate at Harvard and his comrade during the war.

== Background and education ==
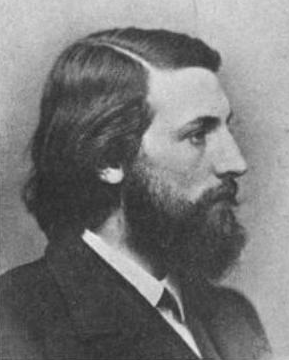
At Harvard, c. 1861

Hallowell was born in Philadelphia, Pennsylvania in 1839 to Morris Longstreth Hallowell, and Hannah (Penrose). Norwood and his brothers, Edward Needles and Richard Price, were raised in a household that was strongly Quaker, and strongly abolitionist; during the Civil War, their father opened his home as a hospital for wounded Union soldiers. He was named for his ancestor Captain Bartholomew Penrose Sr. (1674-1711), who settled in the city of Philadelphia in 1698, establishing a shipyard at the invitation of William Penn that stayed in the Penrose family for 150 years.

He attended Harvard College, where he befriended Oliver Wendell Holmes Jr. He graduated in 1861 and was elected the Class Orator. Their sister Anna Hallowell was a nurse during the Civil War and went on to be an education reformer.

== Civil War service ==
Hallowell's fervent abolitionism led him to volunteer for service in the Civil War, and he inspired Holmes to do the same. He was commissioned a first lieutenant on July 10, 1861, joining the 20th Massachusetts Volunteer Infantry with Holmes. Hallowell fought in the Battle of Ball's Bluff on October 21, 1861, in which he distinguished himself by leading a line of skirmishers to hold off Confederate forces. Hallowell then swam across the Potomac River, constructed a makeshift raft, and made several trips to the Virginia bank to rescue trapped Union soldiers before his raft fell apart. Hallowell was promoted to captain on November 26, 1861. He was wounded in the Battle of Glendale on June 30, 1862, and suffered more severe wounds in the Battle of Antietam on September 17. His left arm was shattered by a bullet but later saved by a surgeon; Holmes was shot in the neck. Both took refuge in a farmhouse (a historic site now known as the Royer–Nicodemus House and Farm) and were eventually evacuated.

On April 17, 1863, he was promoted to lieutenant colonel, as second-in-command (after Colonel Robert Gould Shaw) of the 54th Massachusetts, one of the first all-black regiments in the U.S. In a letter to the governor of Massachusetts, John Murray Forbes recommended Hallowell for the promotion based on his bravery, soundness of mind, and willingness to lead a black regiment despite the fact that many found the idea "unpopular." On May 30, he accepted Governor John A. Andrew's personal request that he be made colonel in command of the 55th Massachusetts, another all-black regiment. He and his regiment were stationed at Charleston Harbor and participated in the siege and eventual taking of Fort Wagner; Hallowell was one of the first to enter the fort after its abandonment. Hallowell faced continuing disability due to his wounds, and was discharged on November 2, 1863.

=== Later life ===
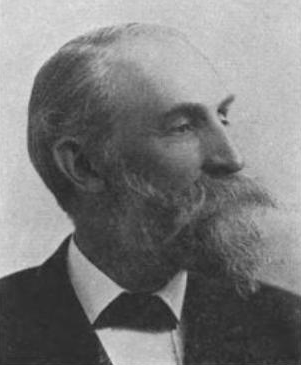

Hallowell moved to New York City, where he first worked for the commission house of Watts, Crane & Co., followed by a partnership with his brother Richard, as Hallowell Brothers and later Hallowell, Prescott & Co.

He moved to Medford, Massachusetts in 1869. He became a wool broker in Boston, and was made vice president of the National Bank of Commerce of Boston in 1886.

== Personal life ==
Hallowell married Sarah Wharton Haydock (1846–1934), a granddaughter of Deborah Fisher Wharton and a niece of Joseph Wharton, founder of the Wharton School of the University of Pennsylvania, in New York on January 27, 1868. They had six children together:

- Anna Norwood Hallowell (1871–1943), who married Horace Andrew Davis, grandson of Gov. John Davis.
- Robert Haydock Hallowell (1873–1958), who married Sarah Borland Jackson, a daughter of James Jackson.
- Norwood Penrose Hallowell (1875–1961), who married Margaret Ingersoll Bowditch, a daughter of Alfred Bowditch. After her death, he married Cornelia Fitch (née Middlebrook) Baekeland.
- John White Hallowell (1878–1927), a football player and businessman who died of typhoid fever.
- Esther Fisher Hallowell (1881–1974), who married Arthur Holdrege Morse, a son of Col. Charles Fessenden Morse.
- Susan Morris Hallowell (1882–1985), who married Lawrence Graham Brooks.

Hallowell died in Medford on April 11, 1914, two days before his 75th birthday. Holmes wrote several days later that his death had left "a great space bare for him." Hallowell had been his "oldest friend...[and was] the most generously gallant spirit and I don't know but the greatest soul I ever knew....[H]e gave the first adult impulse to my youth." African American writer Benjamin Griffith Brawley dedicated his 1921 book, A Social History of the American Negro, "to the memory of Norwood Penrose Hallowell (1839-1914), patriot." He is buried in the Hallowell family plot at Mount Auburn Cemetery in Cambridge, Massachusetts.

=== Descendants ===
He was the grandfather of physiologist Hallowell Davis, and Olympic athlete Norwood Hallowell.

== Legacy ==
In the Civil War film, Glory, Norwood and his brother were recreated as the fictional character, Major Cabot Forbes, portrayed by actor Cary Elwes.

== Writings ==
- The Negro as a Soldier in the War of the Rebellion. Boston: Little, Brown & Company, 1897.
