= Edward Needles Hallowell =

United States civil war officer

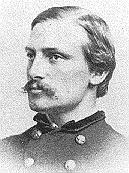
- Born: November 3, 1836; Philadelphia, Pennsylvania
- Died: July 26, 1871 (aged 34); Medford, Massachusetts
- Burial place: Mount Auburn Cemetery; Cambridge, Massachusetts
- Military career
- Allegiance: United States of America
- Service years: 1862 – 1865
- Rank: Colonel; Brevet Brigadier General
- Units: 20th Massachusetts Volunteer Infantry
- Commands: 54th Massachusetts Volunteer Infantry
- Conflicts: American Civil War: Seven Days Battles; Battle of Antietam; Battle of Fredericksburg; Second Battle of Fort Wagner; Battle of Olustee; Battle of Honey Hill; Battle of Boykin's Mill

Edward "Ned" Needles Hallowell (November 3, 1836 – July 26, 1871) was an officer in the Union Army in the duration of the American Civil War, commanding the 54th Massachusetts Volunteer Infantry following the death of Colonel Robert Gould Shaw at the Second Battle of Fort Wagner in 1863.

== Early life ==
Edward grew up in a well-to-do Quaker family in Philadelphia. His father Morris was part owner and operator of Hallowell & Company of 33 South Third Street, Philadelphia. The firm predominantly imported and sold silk from India and China. Edward's father was also a passionate abolitionist. The Hallowell family was far more than passive meeting attenders. The family's summer home was employed as a stop on the Underground Railroad.

Edward and the other children of Morris and Hannah shared the abolitionist views of their parents. His brother Richard Price Hallowell was one of the members of the "Black Committee" that Governor Andrew of Massachusetts selected to inquire of the willingness of prospective candidates to serve in officer positions in the 54th Massachusetts Volunteer Infantry.

He had two children, Charlott and Emily Hallowell, with his wife, Charlotte Bartlett Wilhelmina Swett. Hallowell was a stockbroker before the war and became a wool commission merchant after the war.

== Civil War service ==
In early 1862 Edward joined his brother Norwood Penrose "Pen" Hallowell, who was already serving in the 20th Massachusetts Volunteer Infantry. He served as a lieutenant. While he was in the 20th, the regiment saw considerable action including the Peninsula Campaign, the Seven Days, Antietam and Fredericksburg.

Lt. Edward Hallowell then accepted an appointment in the 54th Massachusetts, which was to be led by Robert Gould Shaw as colonel and his brother Norwood as lieutenant colonel. The regiment was to be made up of white and black abolitionists fighting together for black freedom. Edward recruited African-American soldiers in Philadelphia and was actually the first officer to occupy the barracks set aside for the 54th at Camp Meigs in Reedville. Recruiting for the regiment proved so successful that a second regiment, the 55th, was formed. Norwood Hallowell was designated as the 55th's colonel and Edward was promoted to major and was second-in-command to Shaw.

By the time of the famous assault by the 54th on Fort Wagner Hallowell was promoted to lieutenant colonel. In the assault on Fort Wagner he commanded the left wing with half the regiment's companies. Because of the narrow defile through which the 54th had to pass the left wing was deployed directly behind Shaw and the right wing. Hallowell suffered three wounds in the assault and went home to recuperate. Upon returning he commanded the 54th as a full colonel for the rest of the war, except when he was in temporary command of a brigade.

The 54th and Hallowell continued to serve with distinction during the war. He fought at the Battle of Olustee, the Battle of Honey Hill and the Battle of Boykin's Mill. At Boykin's Mill, Hallowell was in command of Major General Potter's 3rd Brigade. When the fortifications around Charleston fell along with the city it was the 54th under Hallowell that occupied various former Confederate posts including Fort Sumter and Fort Wagner. Additionally, the 54th guarded Confederate prisoners of war during this time, including some whom they had faced at Fort Wagner.

== Post War years ==
Hallowell was mustered out of the Union Army volunteer service on August 20, 1865. Hallowell marched with the Massachusetts members of the 54th Massachusetts Volunteer Infantry Regiment at a post-war victory review held in Boston in December 1865. On January 13, 1866, President Andrew Johnson nominated Hallowell for the award of the honorary grade of brevet brigadier general of volunteers to rank from June 27, 1865 for "meritorious services" during the war. The United States Senate confirmed the award on March 12, 1866.

After the war Edward returned to Medford and became a wool commission merchant. His wounds from the war undoubtedly cut his life short and he died in 1871. He is buried with his wife Charlotte at Mount Auburn Cemetery in Cambridge.

== Legacy ==
The character of Major Cabot Forbes in the film Glory is based somewhat on Edward Hallowell and his brother. Little lasting recognition of either Edward or his brother Norwood exists. One exception is at the famous Union Club off of Boston Common which has meeting rooms dedicated to Edward and Norwood as well as Robert Gould Shaw.

== See also ==
- List of Massachusetts generals in the American Civil War
- Massachusetts in the American Civil War
