= Boston Watercolor Club =

American artists' group, founded 1887

The Boston Watercolor Club (sometimes written Boston Water Color Club) was a society formed in 1887 to promote women watercolor artists in and around Boston, Massachusetts.

== History ==
The Boston Watercolor Club was formed in 1887 to promote and exhibit the work of women artists at a time when they were barred from admission to the male-run Boston Watercolor Society. The group held annual exhibitions. In 1896 the group began admitting male members, and artists such as John La Farge and Maurice Prendergast joined the club.

The group had counterparts in other cities, including the Baltimore Watercolor Club, founded in 1885 because women artists were barred from the Charcoal Club of Baltimore.

The club's records from the period 1887–1916 are held by the Archives of American Art at the Smithsonian Institution.

== Notable women members ==
- Susan H. Bradley (1885-1943)
- Gabrielle D. Clements (1858-1948)
- Lilian Westcott Hale (1880-1963)
- Laura Coombs Hills (1859-1952)
- May Hallowell Loud (1860-1916)
- Sarah Choate Sears (1858-1935)
- Sarah Wyman Whitman (1842-1904)
