= New England Watercolor Society =

The New England Watercolor Society, originally named the Boston Watercolor Society, is an artist-run organization formed to promote and exhibit work by watercolor painters. It was also at one time known as the Boston Society of Watercolor Painters. It is headquartered in Plymouth, Massachusetts.

== History ==
Founded as the Boston Watercolor Society, the group held its first exhibition in 1885, showing works by Childe Hassam, George Randolph Barse, and other artists. In 1892, the group's name was changed to the Boston Society of Watercolor Painters, and in 1966 it was changed back to the Boston Watercolor Society. In 1980, with a growing membership and expanding locales for exhibits, the name was changed to the New England Watercolor Society (NEWS). Andrew Wyeth was made an honorary member a few years before his death in 2009.

The annual exhibition for signature members has been held at various venues, including the Boston Art Club, the Vose Galleries, and the Museum of Fine Arts, Boston. In recent years it has been held, together with painting demonstrations and gallery talks, at the Guild of Boston Artists gallery on Boston's Newbury Street.

The society did not admit women in its early years, so local women artists formed a counter-organization, the Boston Watercolor Club. The NEWS policy was changed in 1925 (five years after women received the right to vote in the United States) to include women as full members. Susan Bradley, Sarah Choate Sears, and Nellie Littlehale Murphy were among the first female members.

In 1988 NEWS began hosting a national biennial juried competition, which was held at the Federal Reserve Gallery through 2000 when the gallery closed. Since then it has been held at the Concord Art Association, the Bennington Center for the Arts, the North Shore Art Association, and the South Shore Art Center, among other venues. In alternate years NEWS hosts a New England regional juried competition.

Signature members – those who have been juried into at least four open shows – currently number slightly fewer than 200.

== Notable members ==
- George Randolph Barse (1861-1938)
- Frank Weston Benson (1862-1951)
- Charles Copeland (1858-1945)
- Childe Hassam (1859-1935)
- John Singer Sargent (honorary member) (1856-1925)
- Charles Herbert Woodbury (1864-1940)
- Andrew Wyeth (honorary member) (1917-2009)
