= Maurice Prendergast =

American painter

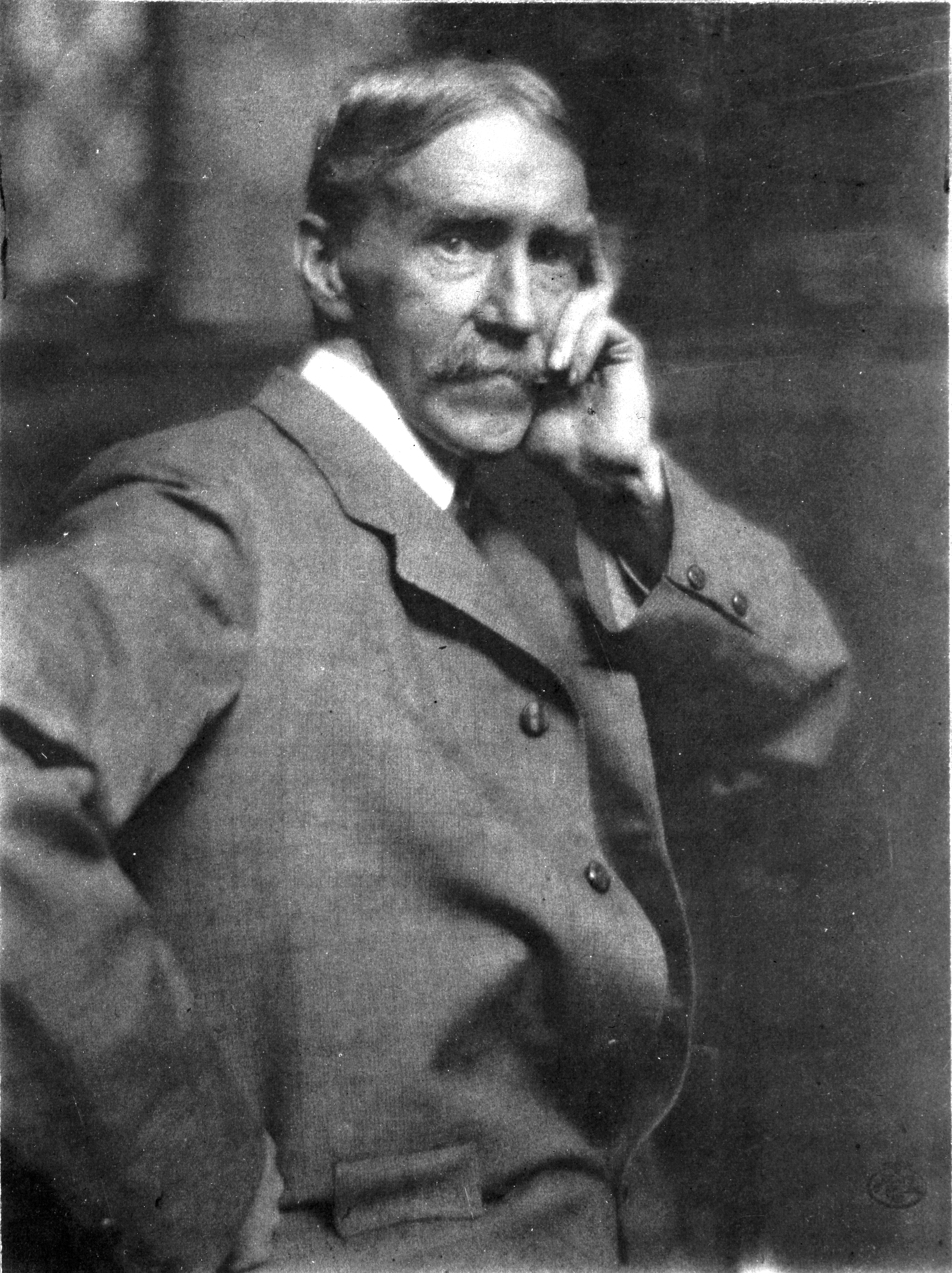
- Prendergast in 1913, photo by Gertrude Käsebier
- Born: Maurice Brazil Prendergast; October 10, 1858; St. John's, Newfoundland and Labrador
- Died: February 1, 1924 (aged 65)
- Education: Académie Colarossi, Académie Julian Paris
- Known for: Post-Impressionism, Painting

Maurice Brazil Prendergast (October 10, 1858 – February 1, 1924) was a Newfoundlander-American artist who painted in oil and watercolor, and created monotypes. His delicate landscapes and scenes of modern life, characterized by mosaic-like color, are generally associated with Post-Impressionism. Prendergast, however, was also a member of The Eight, a group of early twentieth-century American artists who, aside from Prendergast, represented the Ashcan School.

== Biography ==
Maurice Prendergast and his twin sister, Lucy, were born at their family's subarctic trading post in the city of St. John's, in Newfoundland, then a colony in British North America. After the trading post failed, the family moved to Boston. He grew up in the South End and was apprenticed as a youth to a commercial artist. At 14 he went to work in a dry goods store as a package wrapper. This conditioned him from the start to the brightly colored, flat patterning effects that characterized his mature work. He was also inspired by the example of Boston Impressionist Childe Hassam. A shy individual who experienced increasing deafness in his later years, Prendergast remained a bachelor throughout his life. He became closely attached to his younger brother Charles, who was also a post-impressionist painter.

Prendergast studied in Paris from 1891 to 1895, at the Académie Colarossi with Gustave Courtois and Jean-Joseph Benjamin-Constant and at the Académie Julian. During one of his early stays in Paris, he met the Canadian painter James Morrice, who introduced him to English avant-garde artists Walter Sickert and Aubrey Beardsley, all ardent admirers of James McNeill Whistler. A further acquaintance with Édouard Vuillard and Pierre Bonnard placed him firmly in the Post-Impressionist camp. He also studied the work of Vincent van Gogh and Georges Seurat at retrospectives held in Paris in 1891 and 1892. Prendergast was additionally one of the first Americans to espouse the work of Paul Cézanne and to understand and utilize his expressive use of form and color.

Prendergast returned to Boston in 1895 and worked mainly in watercolor and monotyping. A trip to Venice in 1898 exposed him to the genre scenes of Vittore Carpaccio and encouraged him to experiment with even more complex and rhythmic arrangements. His inventive watercolors of Venice are among his most appreciated works today. In 1900, he had major exhibitions at the Art Institute of Chicago and at Macbeth Galleries in New York, which earned him critical acclaim. He showed in a National Arts Club exhibition in 1904, through which he befriended the painters William Glackens, Robert Henri, and John French Sloan. He exhibited with them in 1908 at Macbeth Galleries, along with George Luks, Everett Shinn, and Arthur B. Davies, a group collectively known after the show as The Eight. Glackens in particular became a lifelong friend.

Despite poor health that hindered his work, Prendergast continued to show in major exhibitions throughout the remainder of his life. Important collectors like Albert Barnes and Ferdinand Howald became his patrons after his shows at the Carroll Gallery and the Daniel Gallery. His seven works at the landmark Armory Show of 1913 presented examples of his stylistic maturity. Seen in company with the most adventurous examples of Post-Impressionism and Fauvism, "his critical reception grew more favorable in [the] immediate aftermath [of that exhibition.]" In 1916, he participated in the "Fifty at Montross" show at the Montross Gallery, which also included works by Cézanne, Matisse, Seurat, and Van Gogh. His work was the subject of a retrospective at Joseph Brummer Gallery in 1921, but the Metropolitan Museum of Art declined to host a Prendergast memorial retrospective after his death in 1924; at that time, his art was still seen as too demanding and advanced for the Metropolitan's trustees. His first New York memorial exhibition was held ten years later at the Whitney Museum of American Art.

== "The Eight" ==
Prendergast exhibited at the Macbeth Galleries in 1908 with the short-lived association of artists known as "The Eight" because he supported their protest against the academic bias and restrictive exhibition policies of the powerful, conservative National Academy of Design. He believed in a "no jury, no prizes" openness that would allow independent or unconventional artists greater opportunities to find a wider, appreciative audience for their work. This controversial exhibition, which acquired legendary status in American art history, is seen as a seminal moment in the public response to Ashcan realism, as that form of gritty urban representational art was the style practiced by five of the participants (Henri, Sloan, Luks, Shinn, and Glackens), but Prendergast has nothing in common, in style or content, with that school of painting. Prendergast was far more a Modernist than any of the other seven members of The Eight. His ties to The Eight did not necessarily help his reputation in the long run: "Prendergast's irrevocable association with The Eight left him stylistically isolated in genealogies of modern art." A true independent, he fits into no particular category of modern American art.

== Work ==
Prendergast's work was strongly associated from the beginning with leisurely scenes set on beaches and in parks. His early work was mostly in watercolor or monotype, and he produced over two hundred monotypes between 1895 and 1902. He also experimented with oil painting in the 1890s, but did not focus on that medium until the early 1900s.

He developed early in his career and continued throughout his life to elaborate a highly personal style, with boldly contrasting, jewel-like colors, and flattened, pattern-like forms rhythmically arranged on a canvas. Forms were radically simplified and presented in flat areas of bright, unmodulated color. His paintings have been aptly described as tapestry-like or resembling mosaics.

== Gallery ==
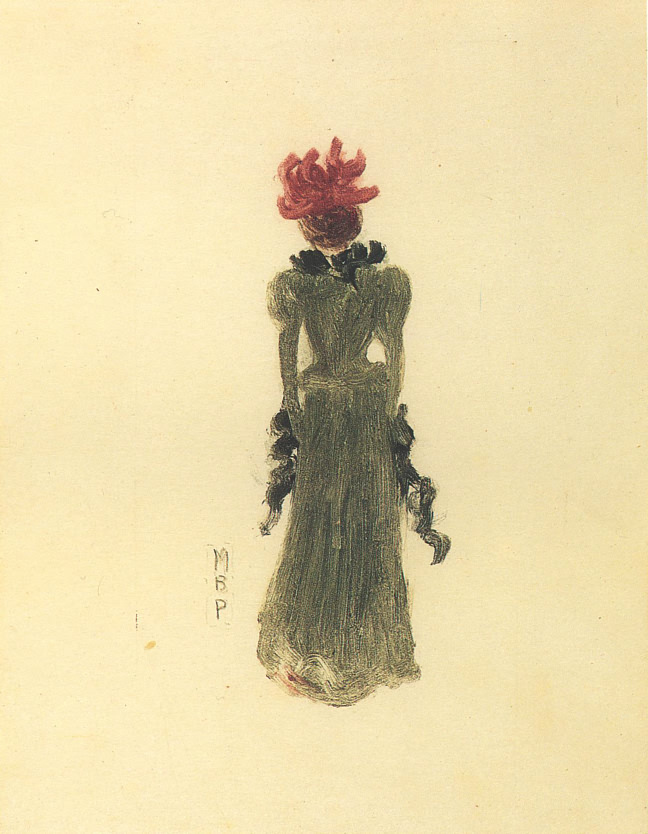
Green Dress (1891–94)

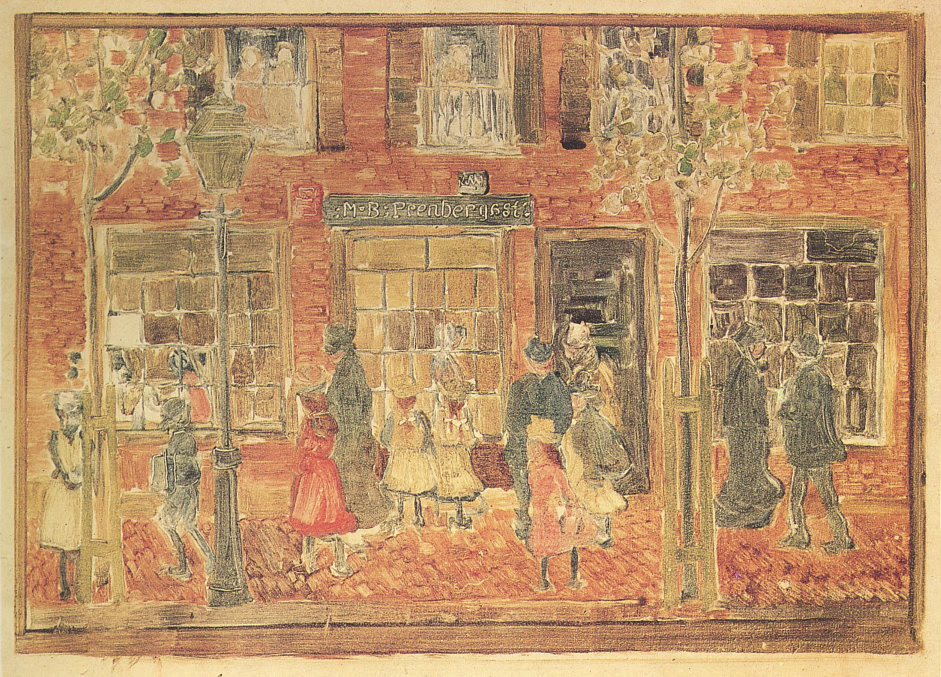
Street Scene (1891–94)

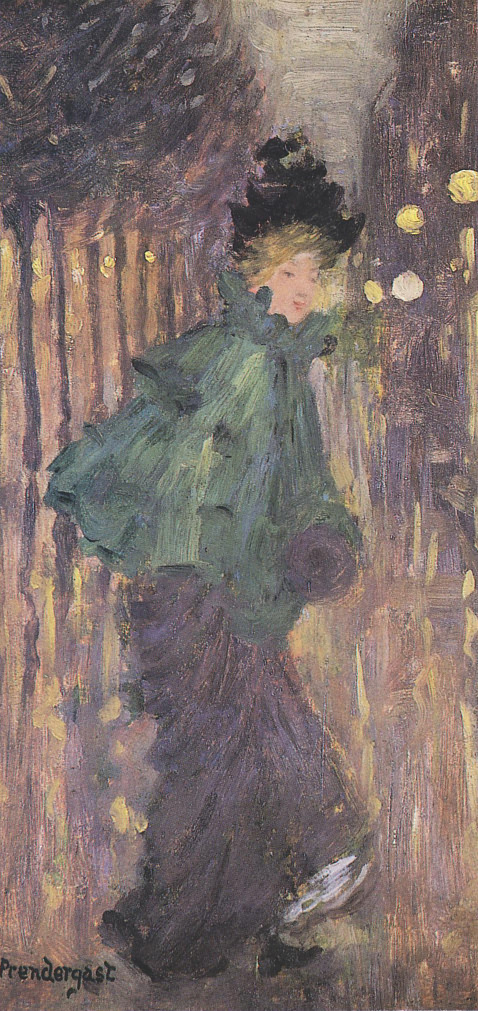
Lady on the Boulevard/The Green Cape (1892)

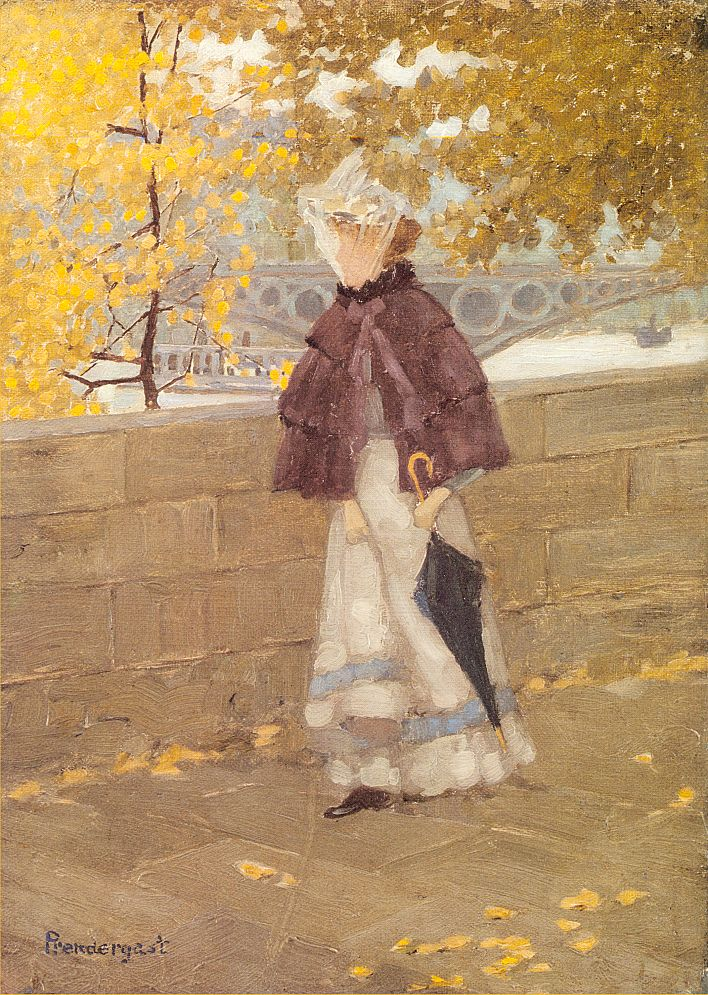
Along the Seine (1892–94)

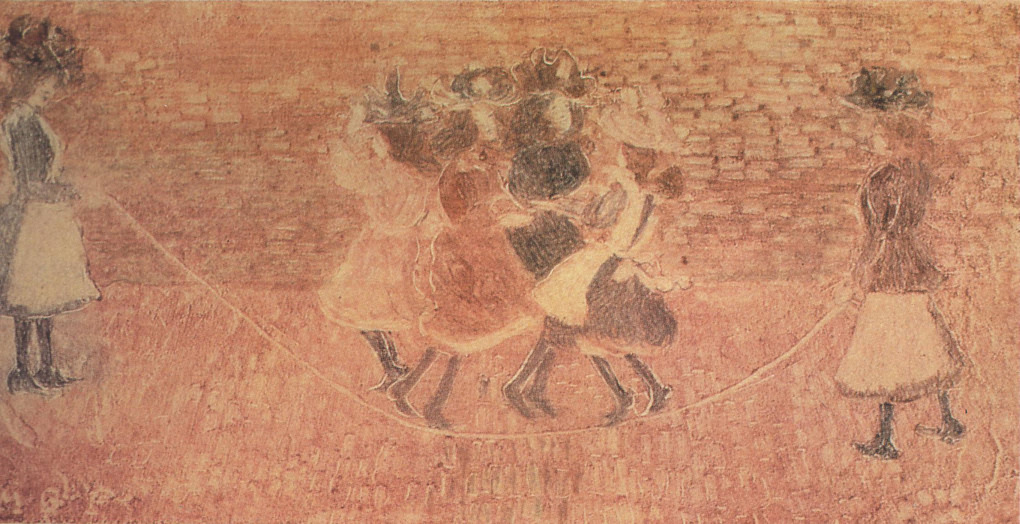
Skipping Rope (1892–95)

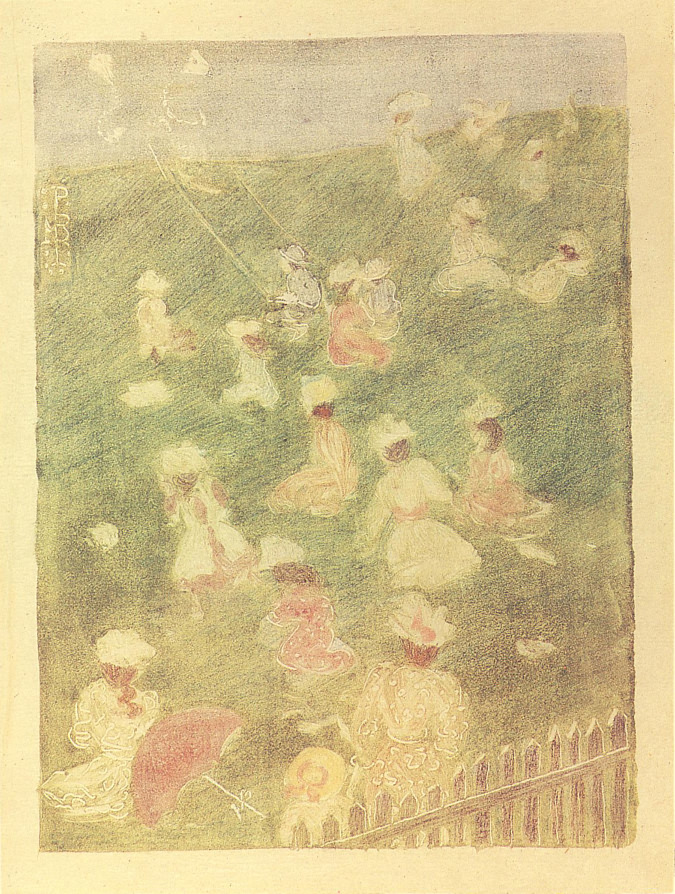
Children at Play (1895)

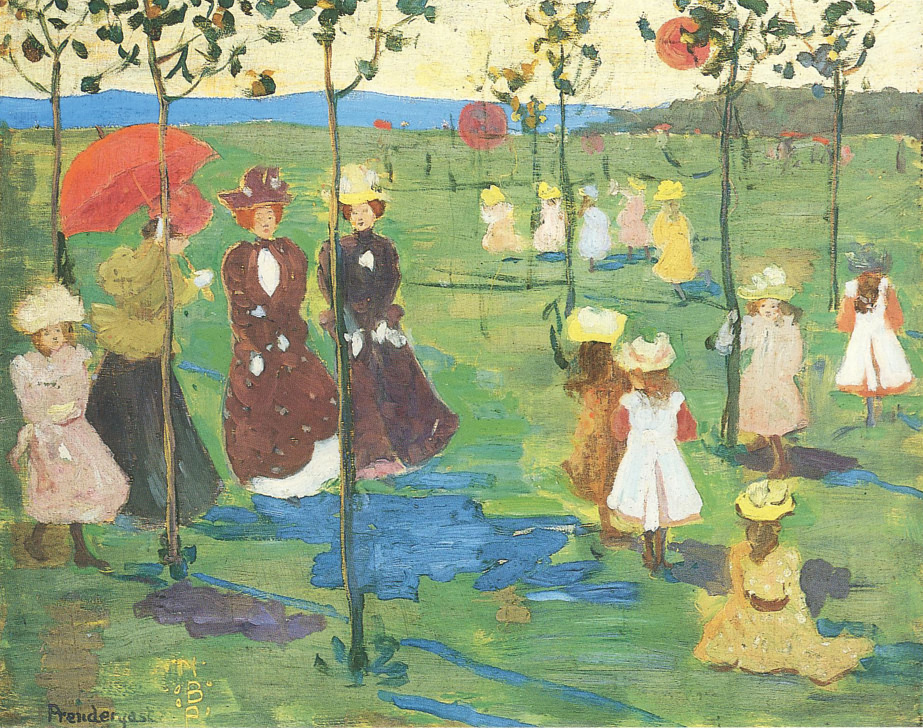
Franklin Park Boston (1895)

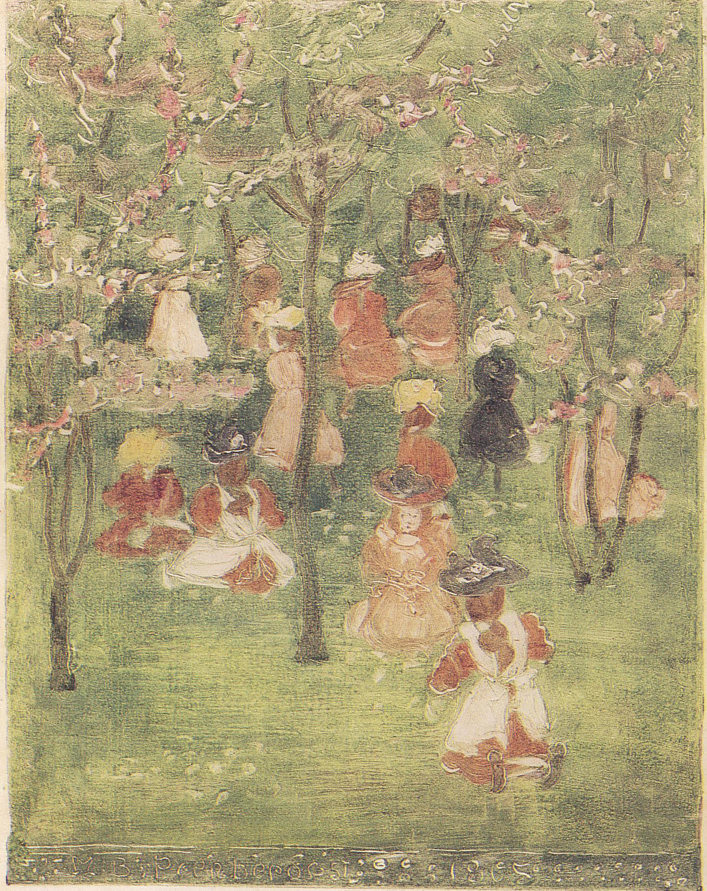
Spring in Franklin Park (1895)

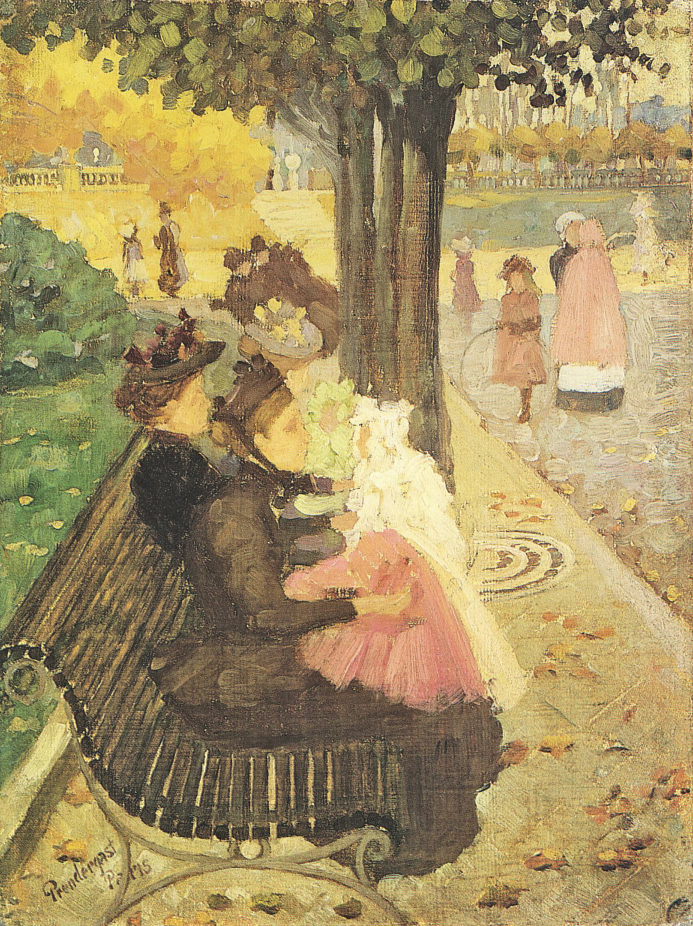
The Tuileries Gardens, Paris (1895)

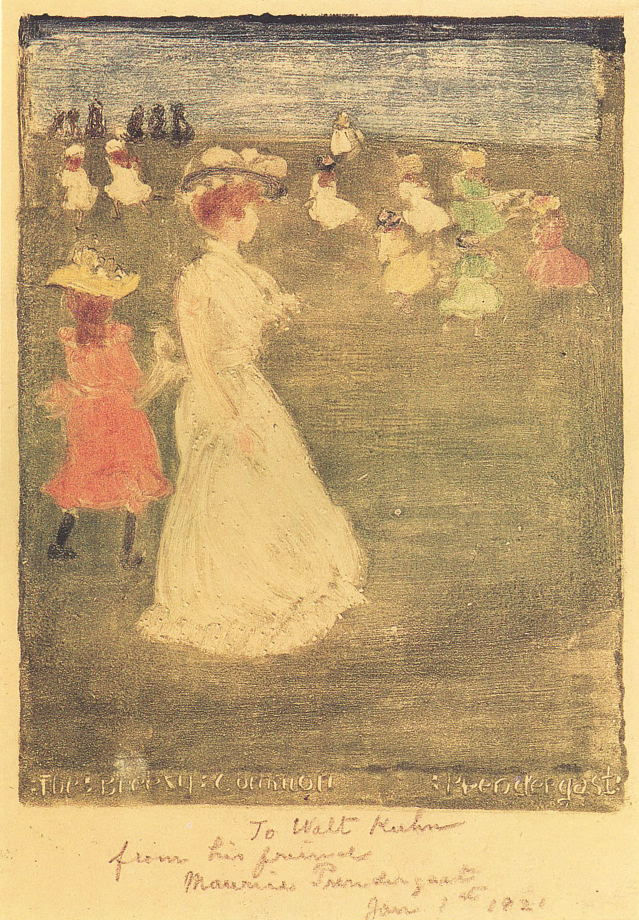
The Breezy Common (1895–97)

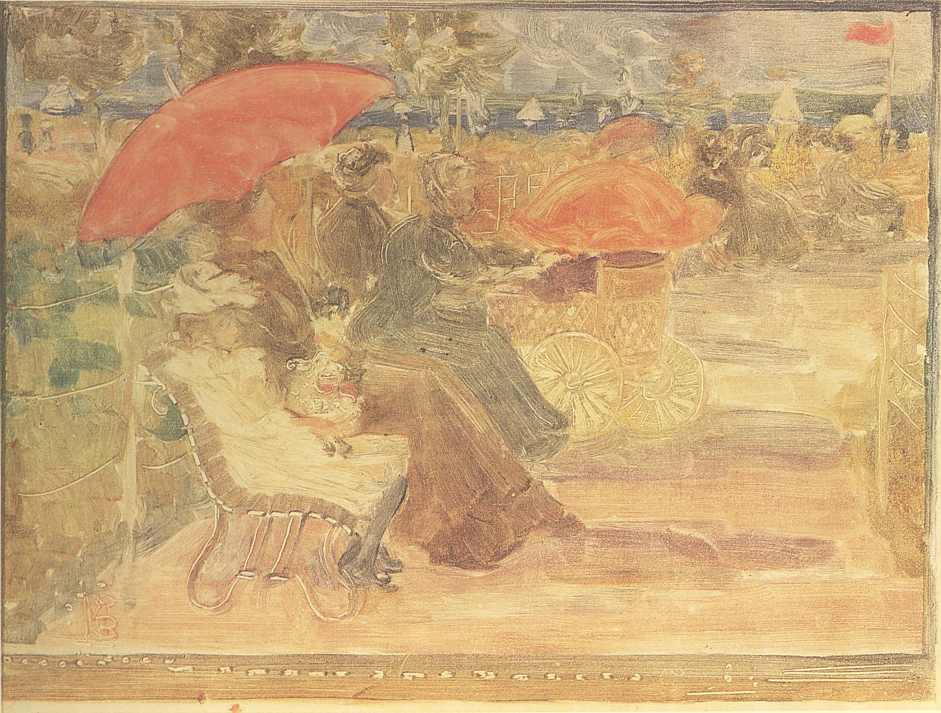
Marine Park (1895–97)

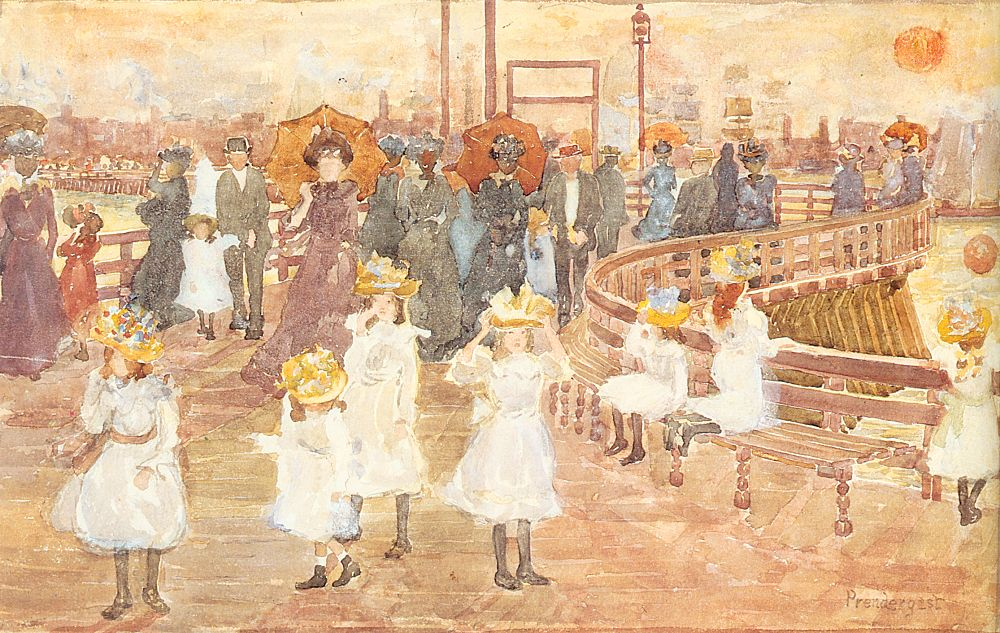
South Boston Pier (1895–97)

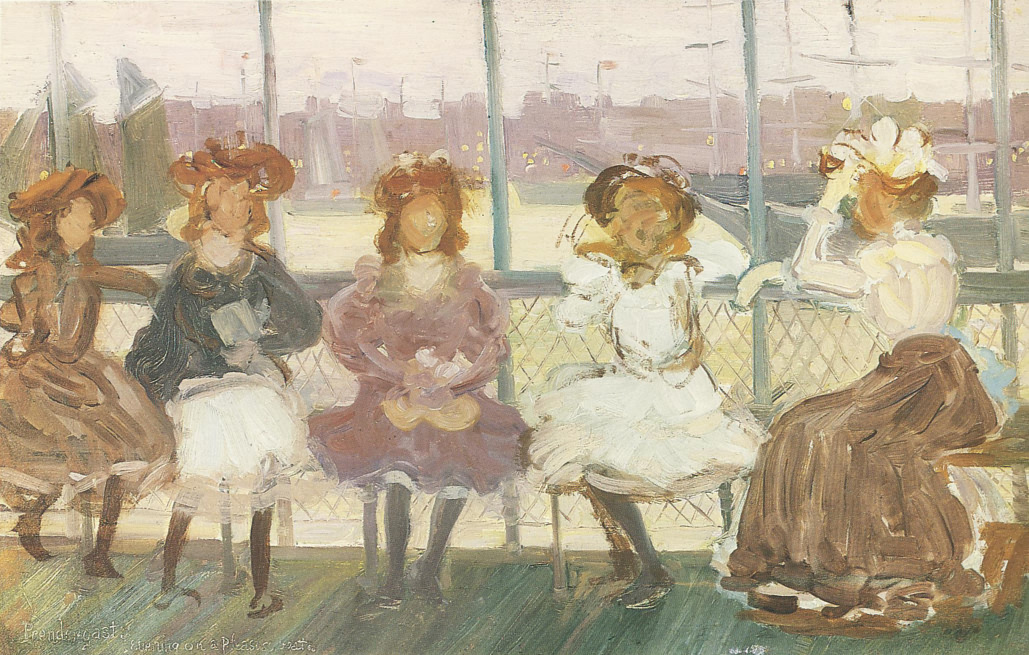
Evening on a Pleasure Boat (1895–98)

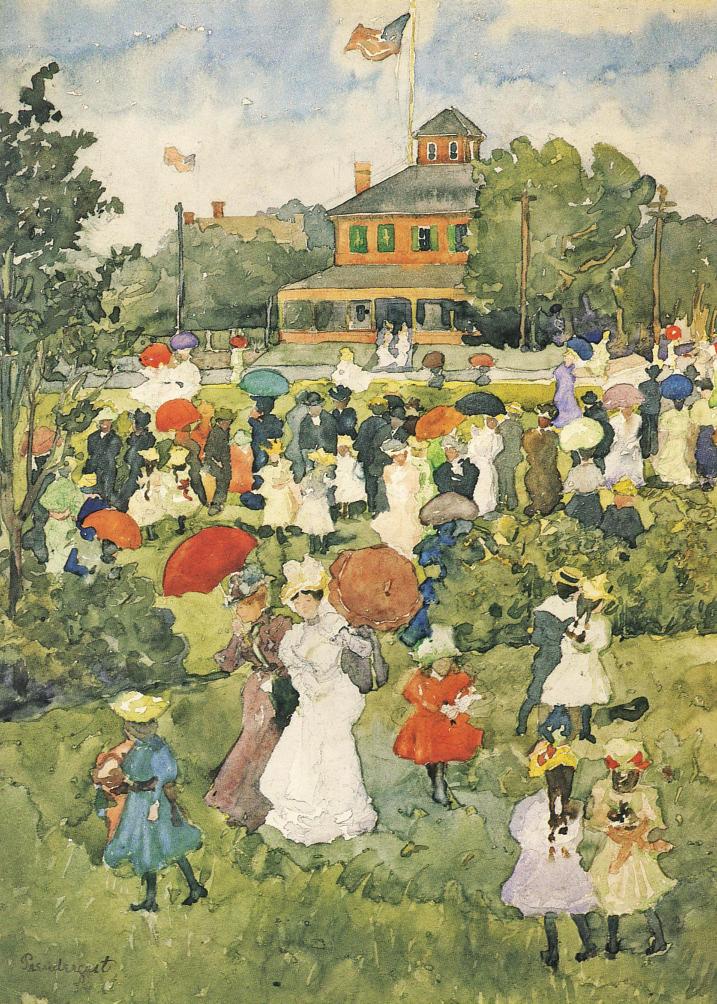
Franklin Park Boston (1895–98)

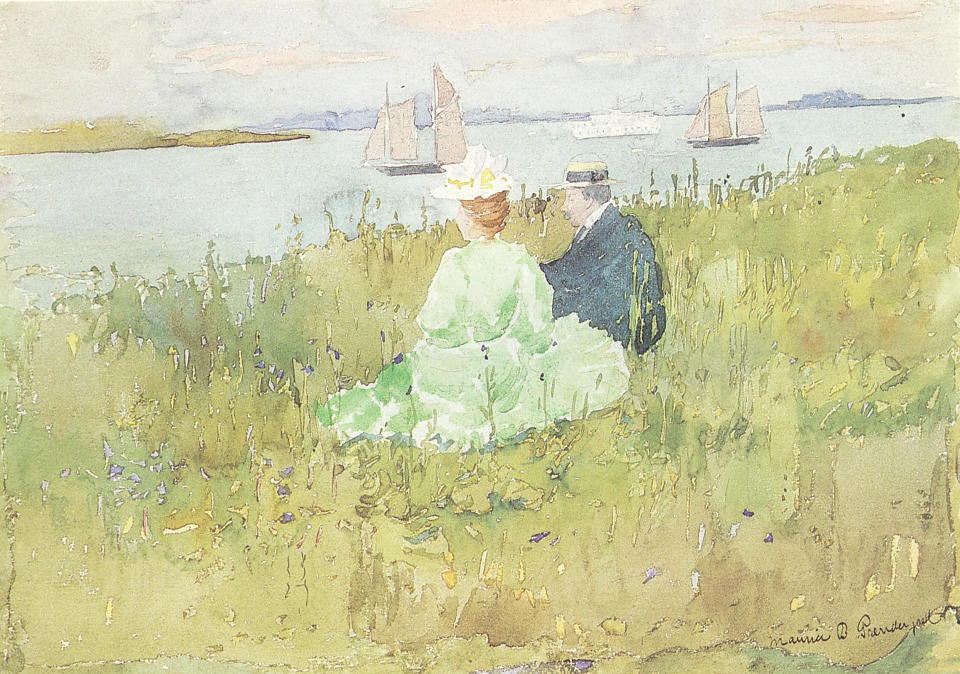
Viewing the Ships (1896)

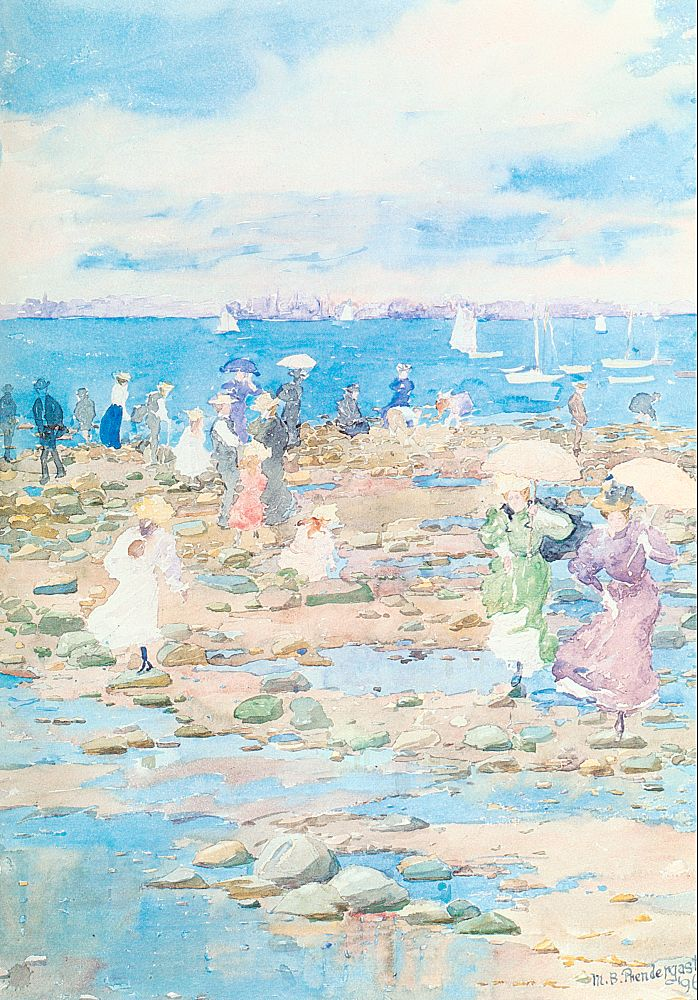
Summer Visitors (1897)

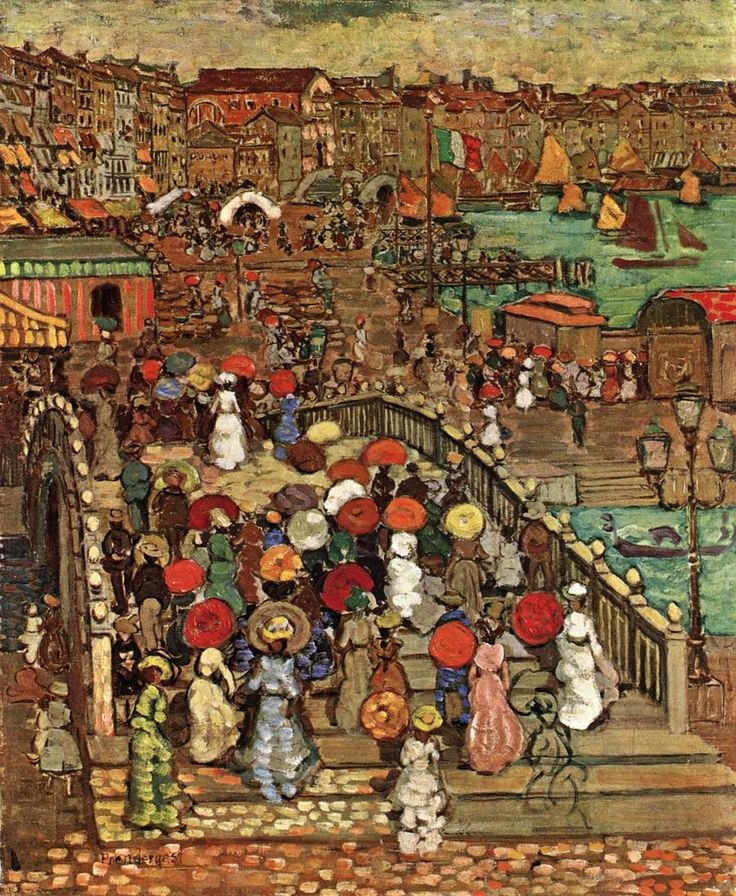
Ponte della Paglia (1898–99)

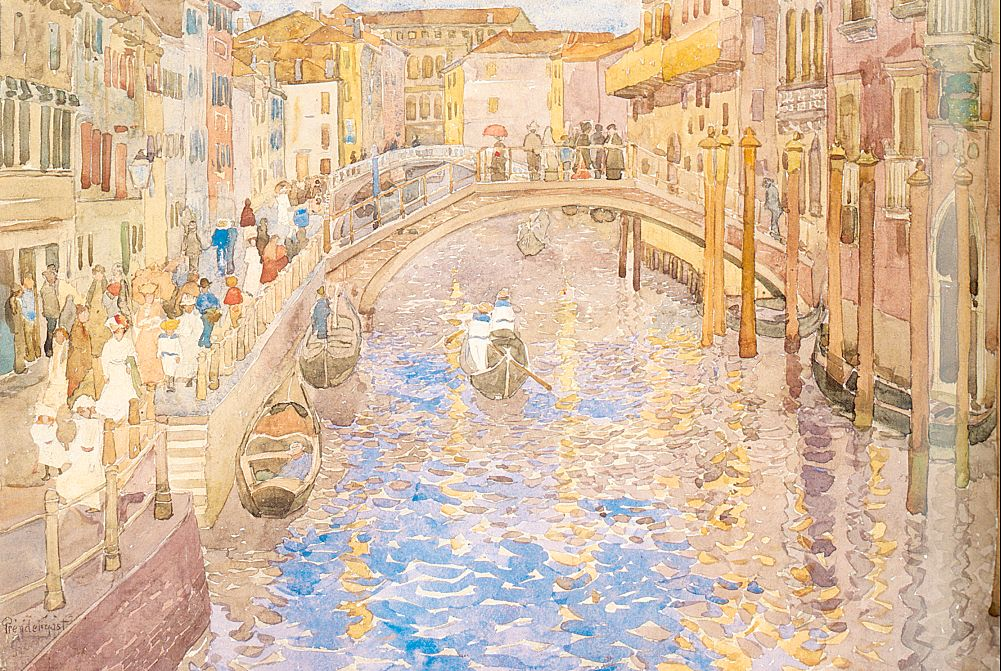
Venetian Canal Scene (1898–99)

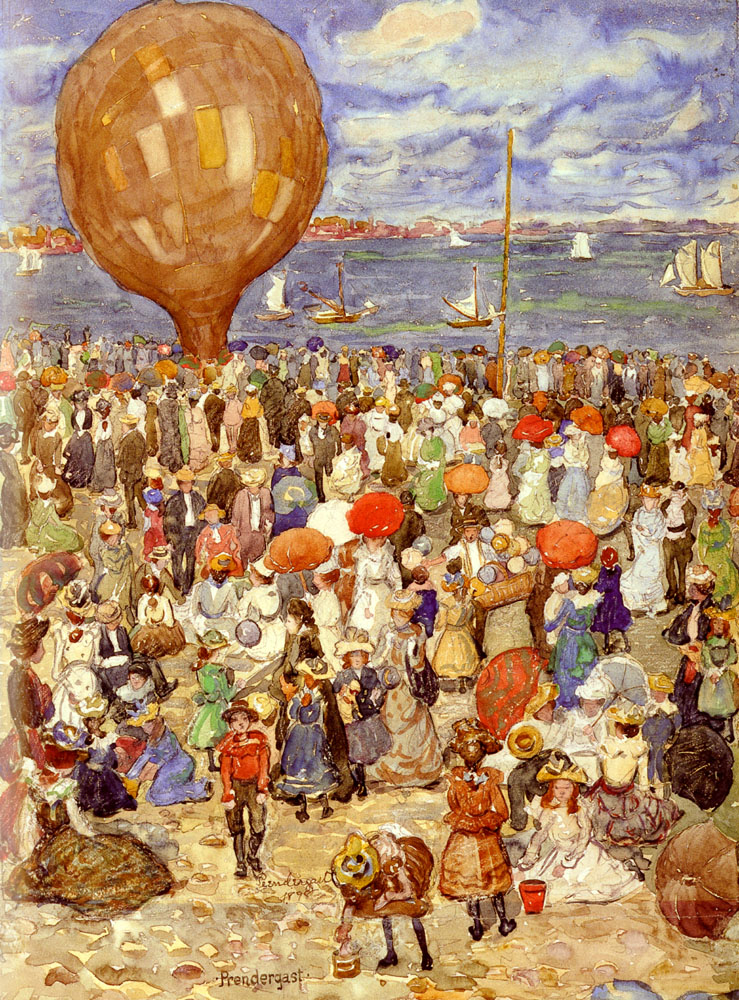
The Balloon (1898)

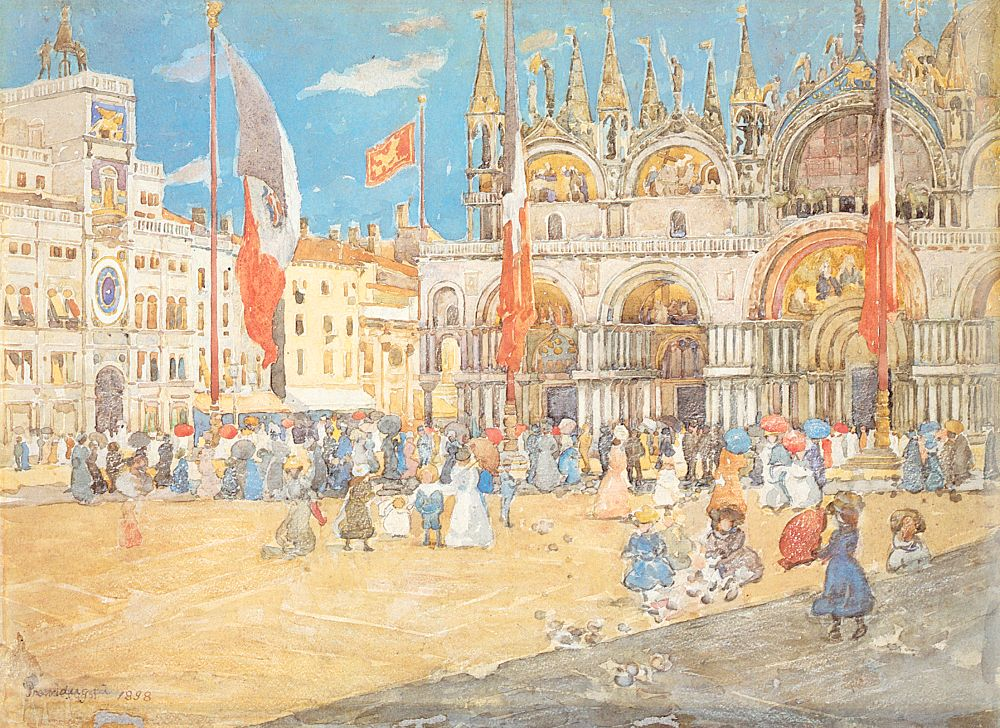
St. Mark's Venice (1898)

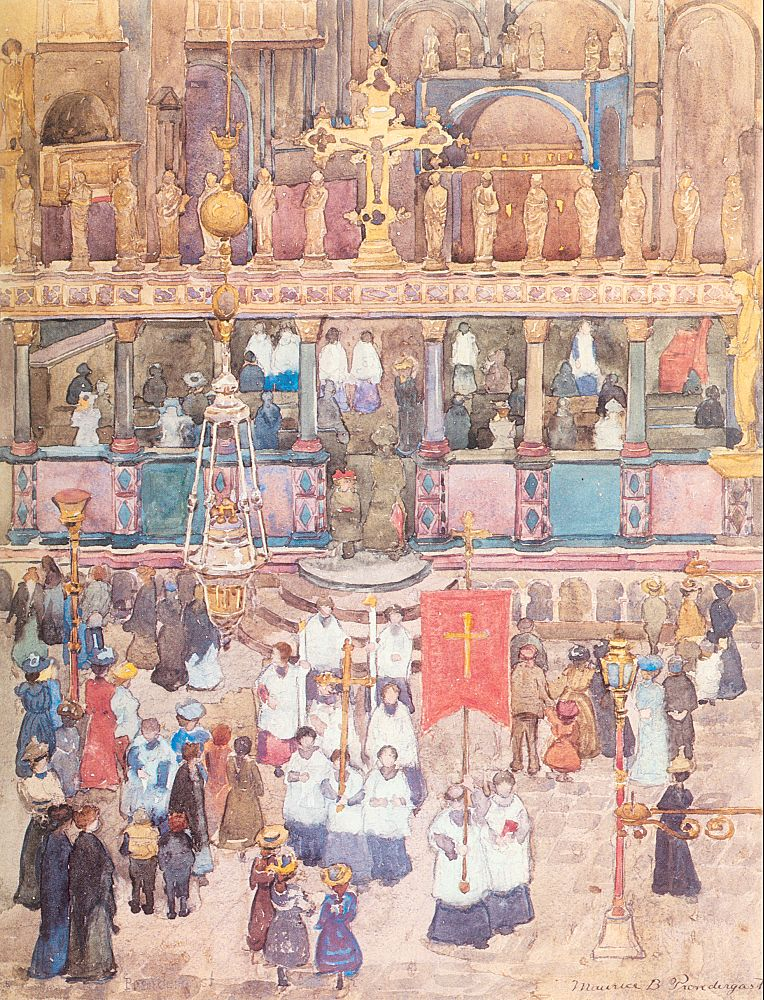
Easter Procession St. Mark's (1898)

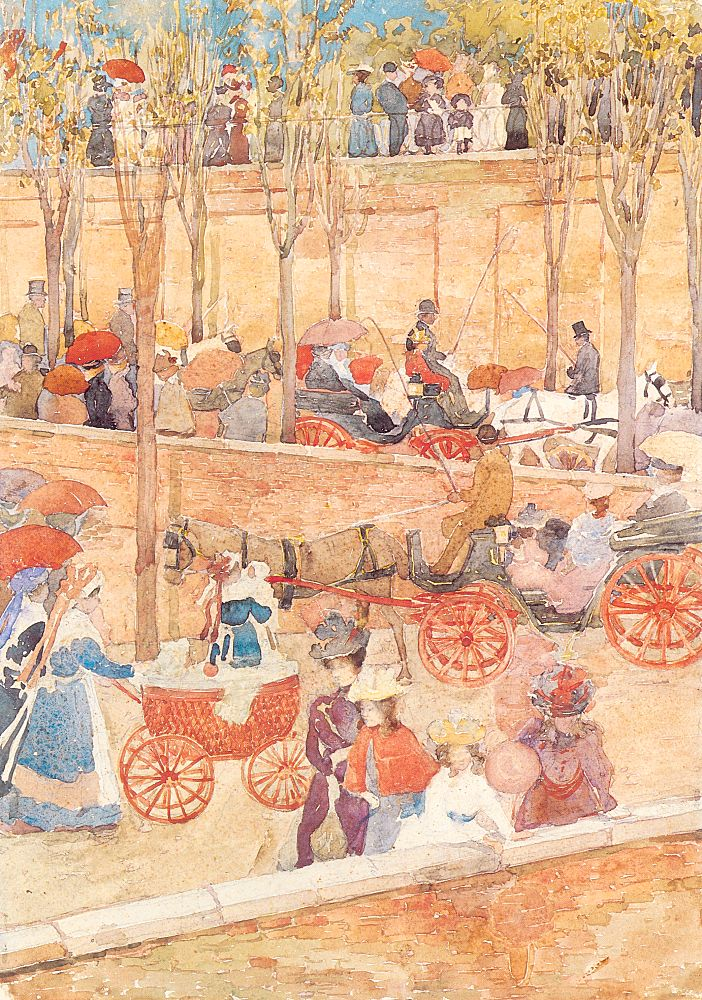
Afternoon. Pincian Hill [in Rome] (1898–99)

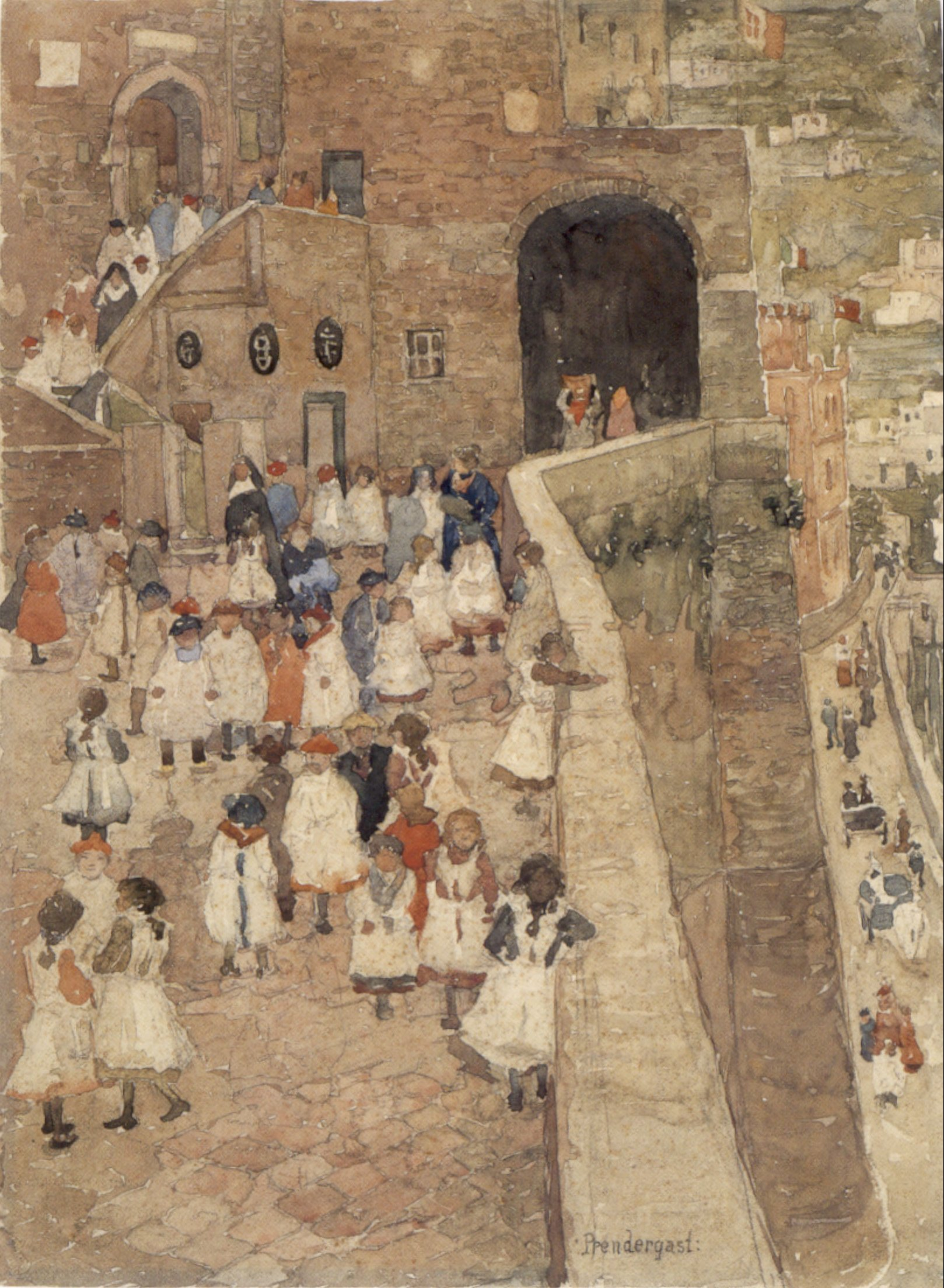
Courtyard Scene, Siena (c. 1898–99)

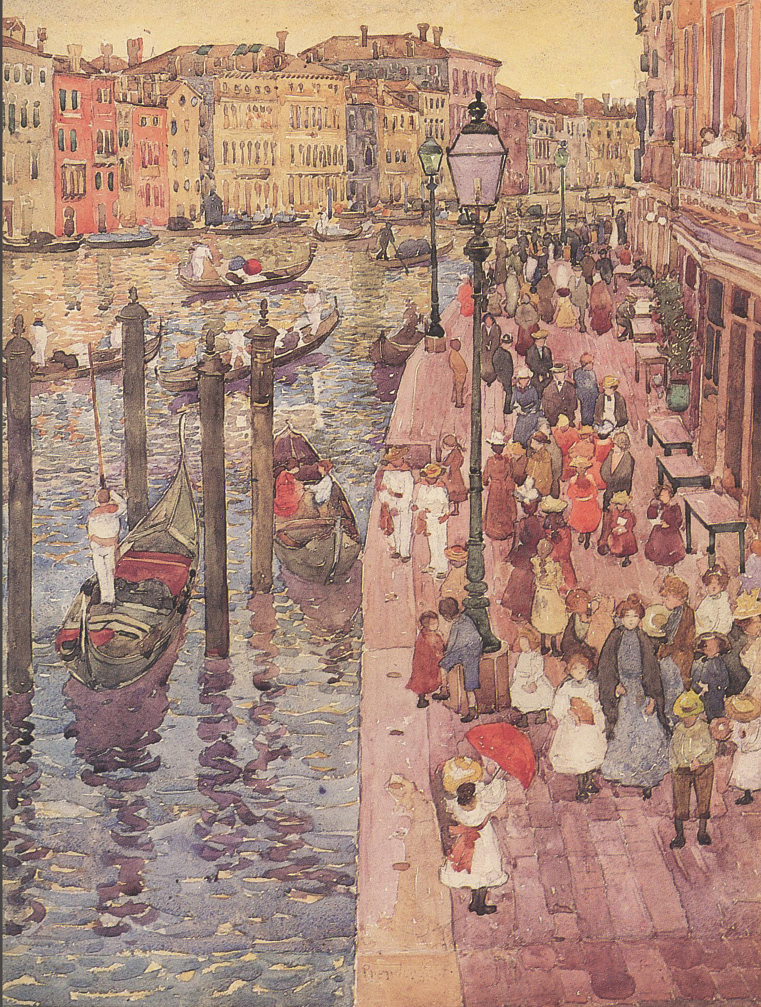
The Grand Canal, Venice (1898–99)

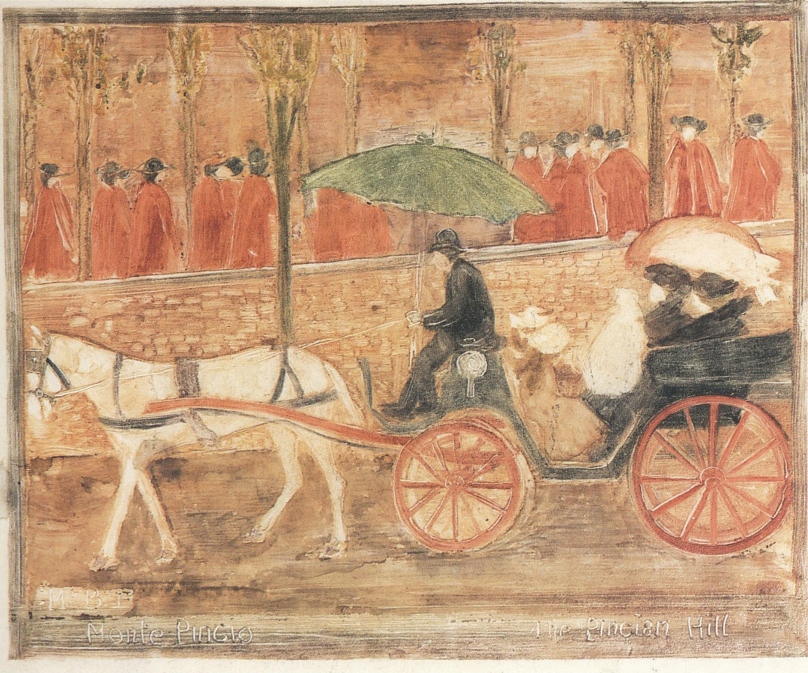
Monte Pincio (1898–99)

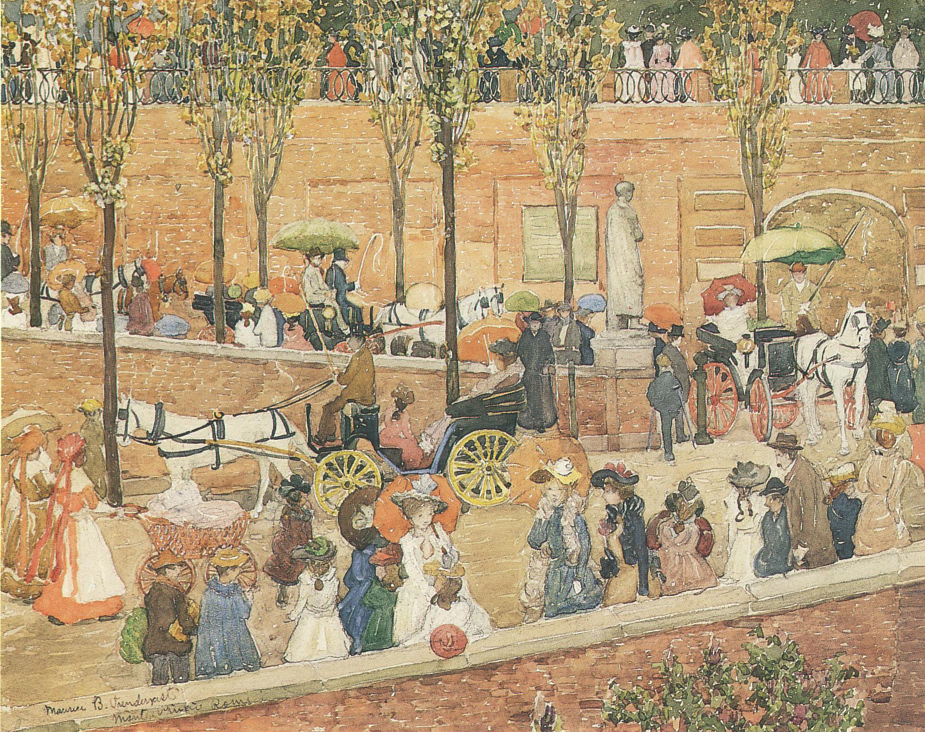
Monte Pincio Rome (1898–99)

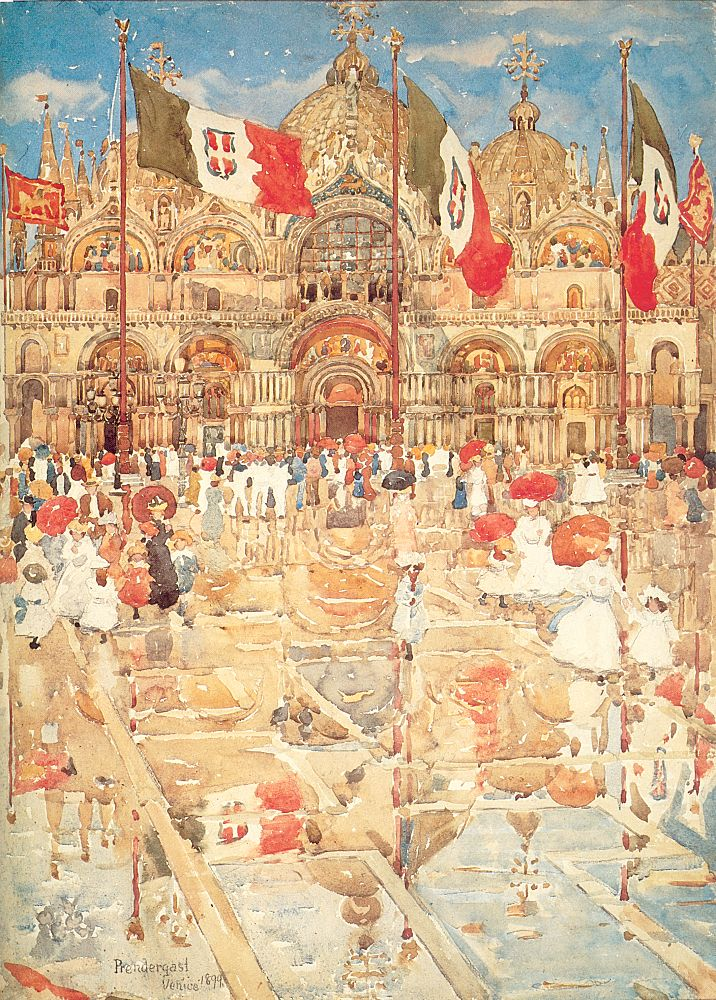
Splash of Sunshine and Rain (1899)

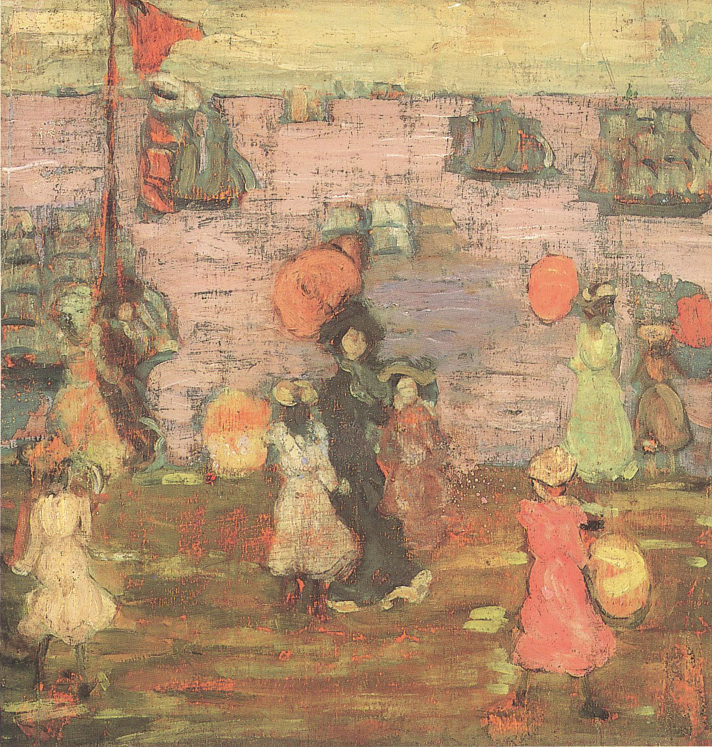
Telegraph Hill (1900)

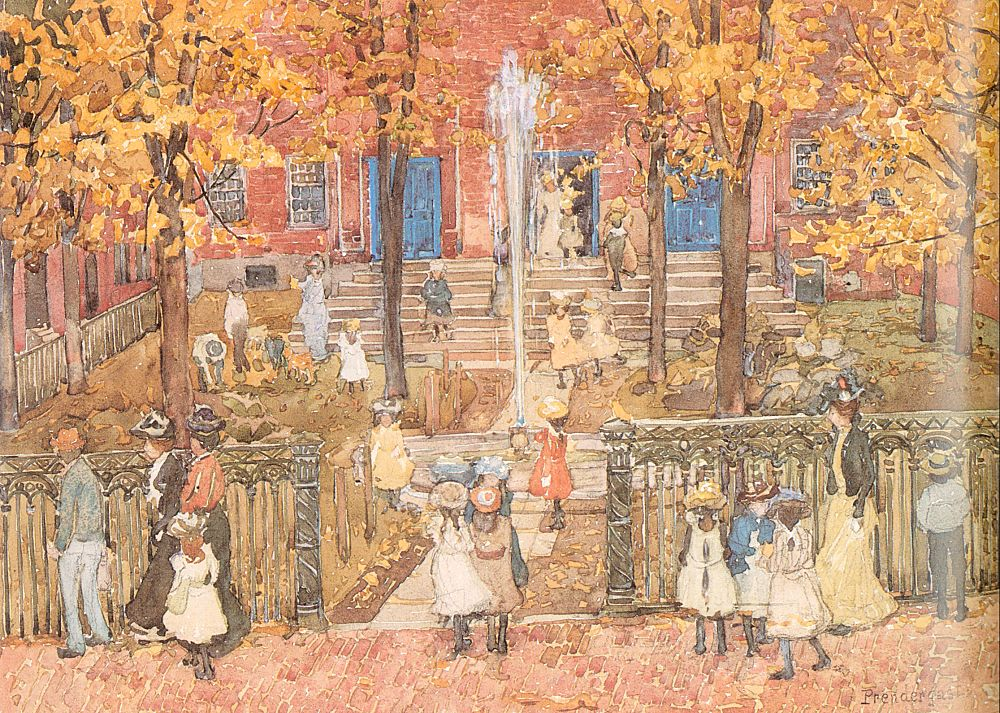
West Church Boston (1900–01)

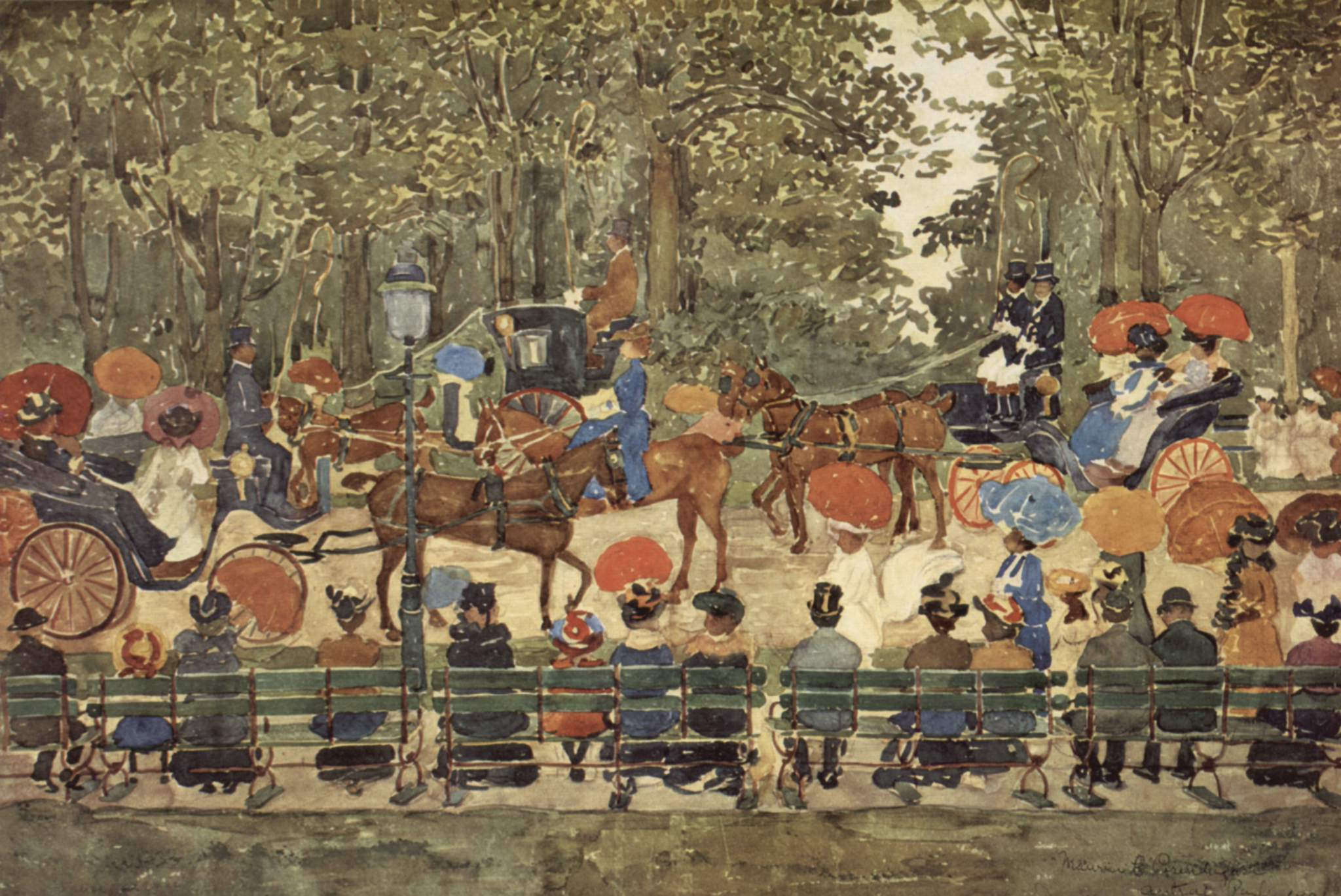
Central Park, New York (1901)

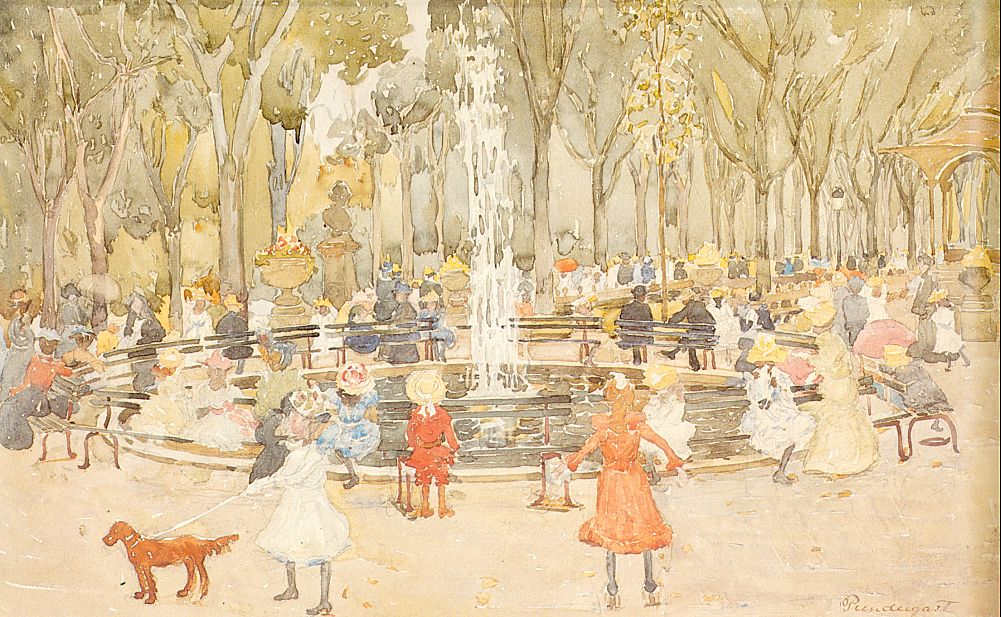
In Central Park New York (1900–03)

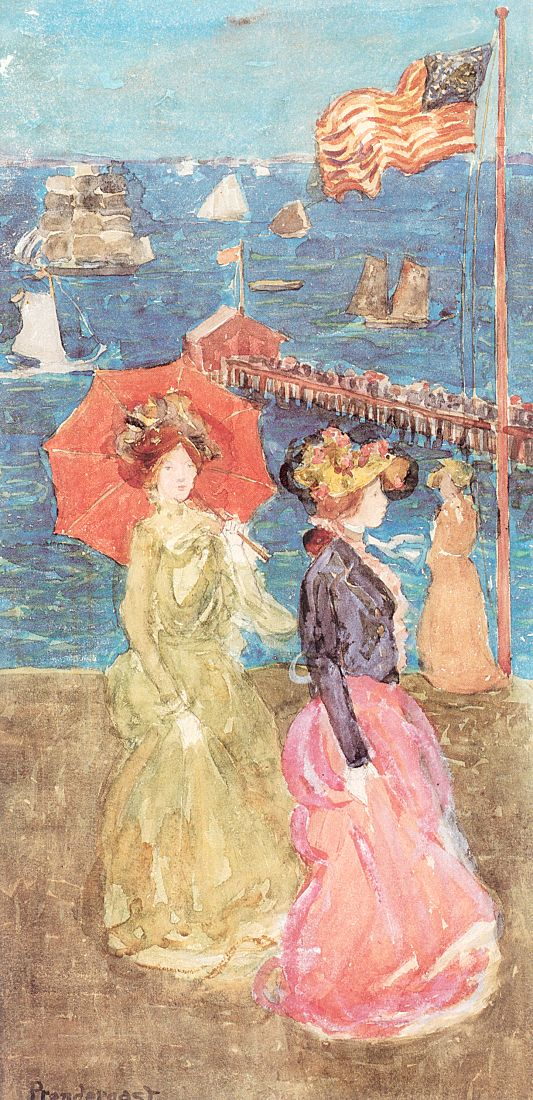
Figures Under the Flag (1900–05)

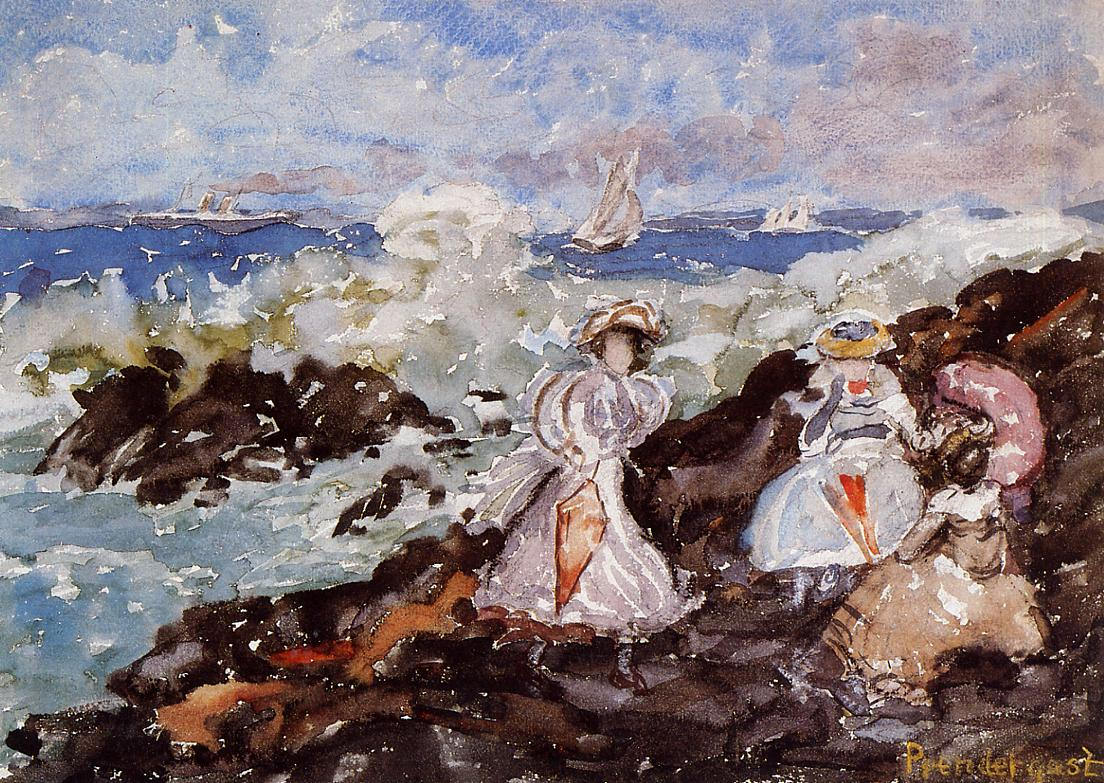
Surf, Cohasset (1900–05)

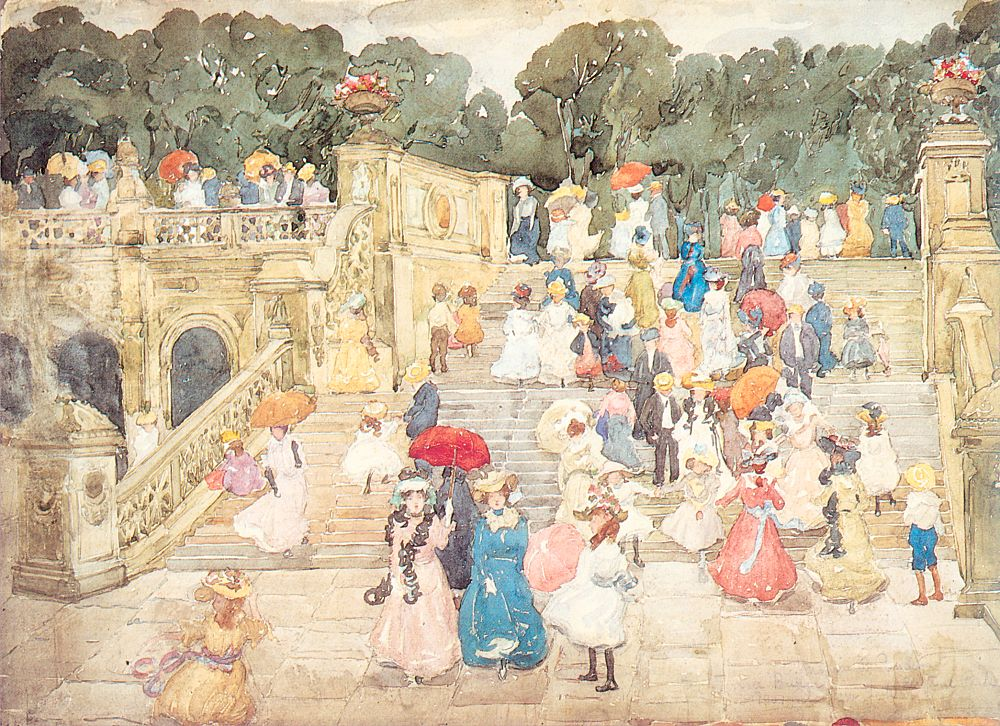
The Mall Central Park (1901)

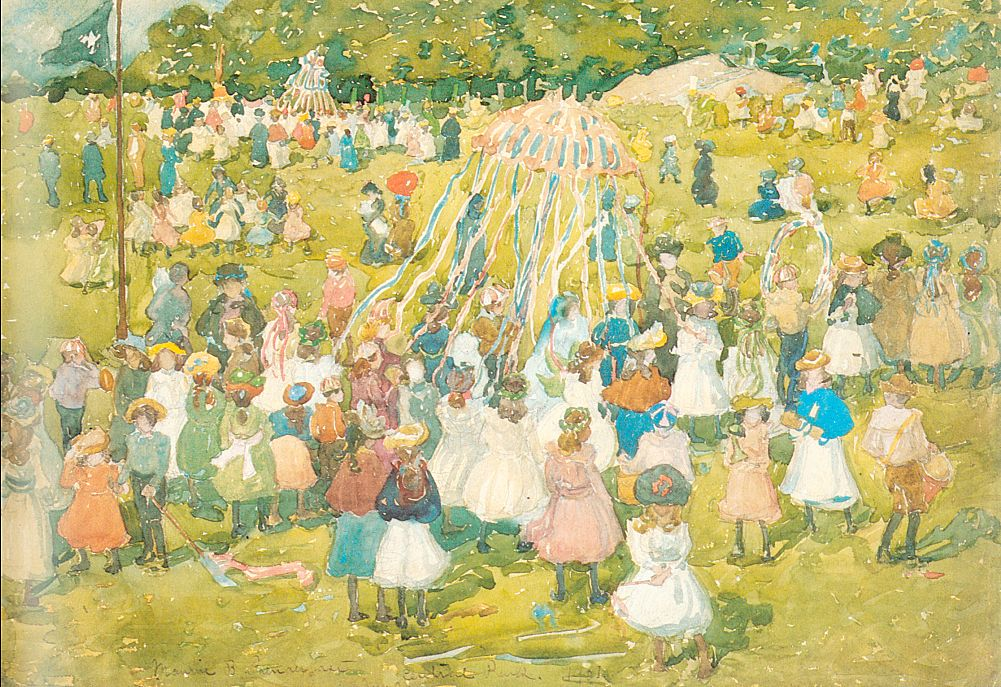
May Day Central Park (1901)

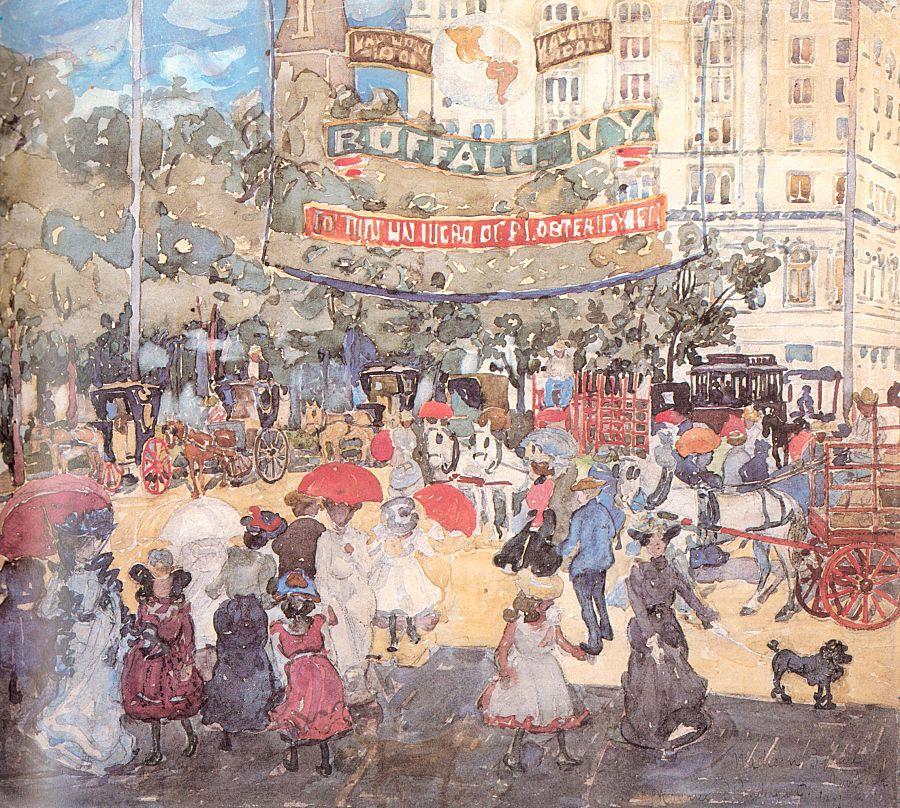
Madison Square (1901)

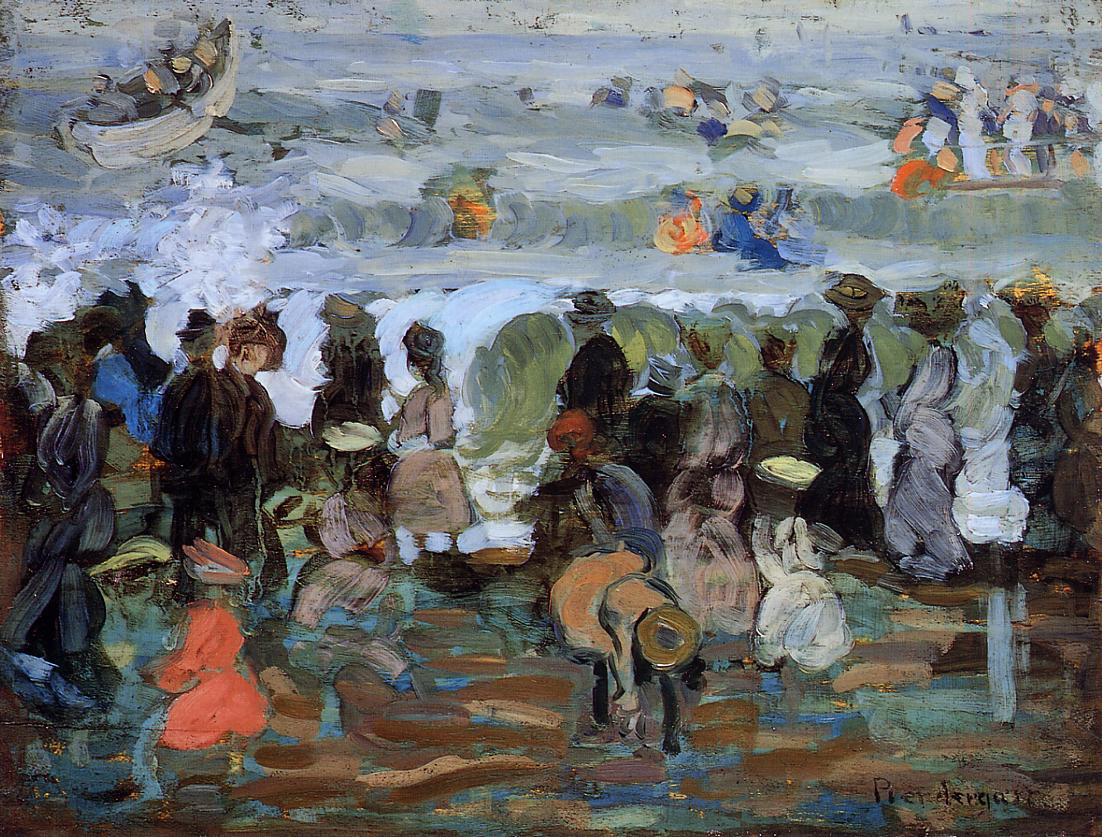
After the Storm (1902–06)

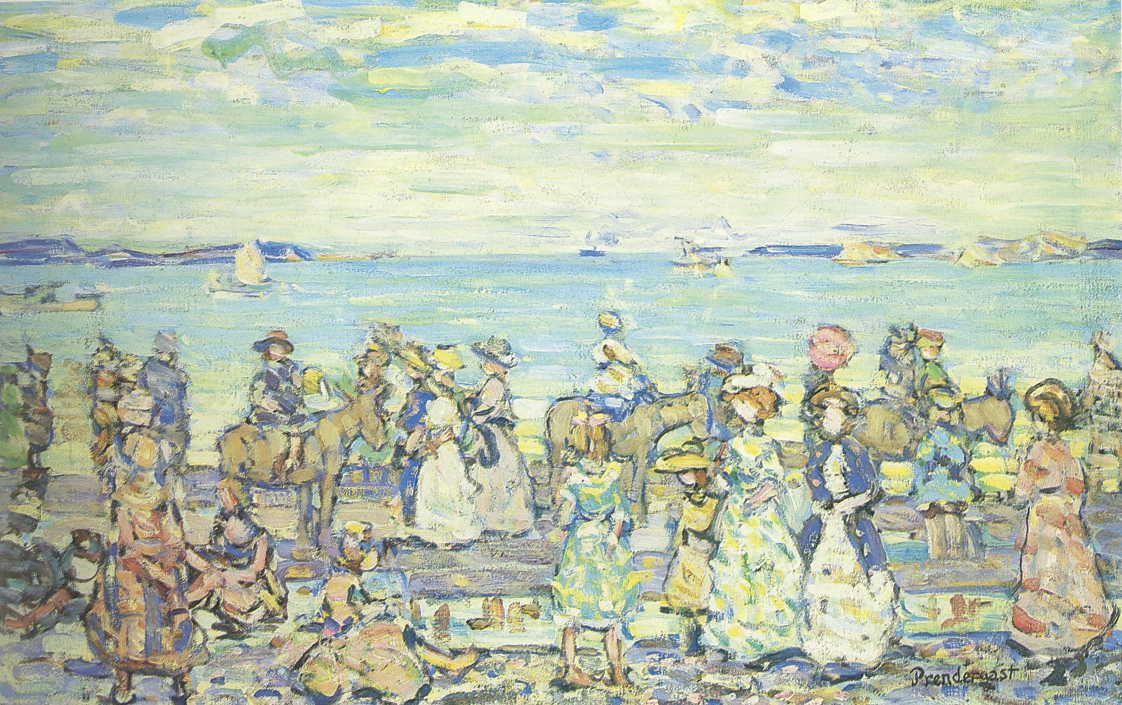
Opal Sea (1903–10)

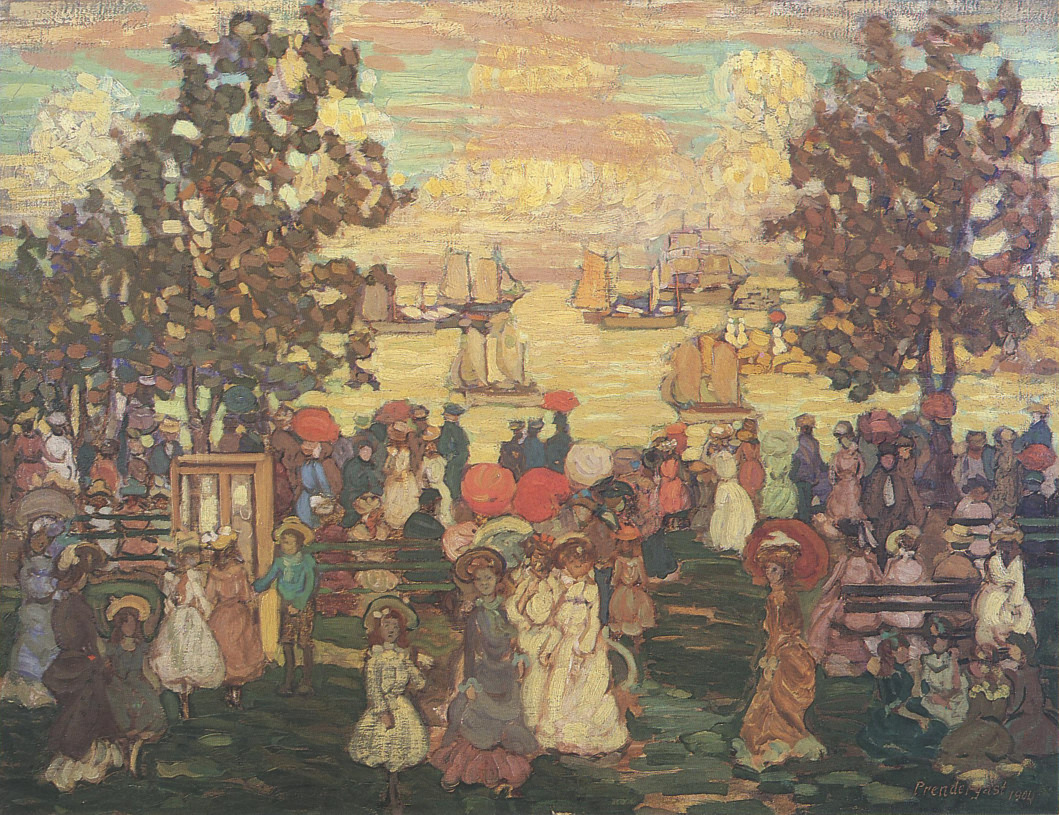
Salem Willows (1904)

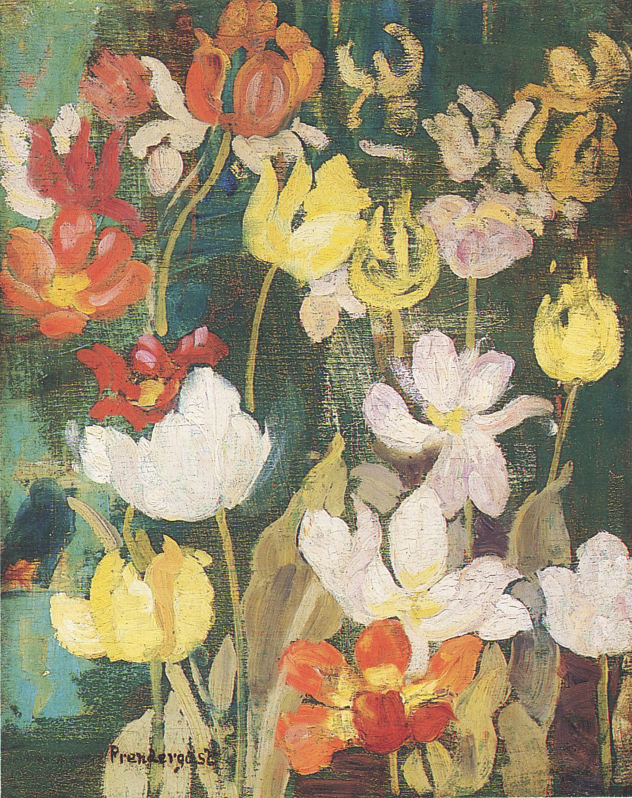
Spring Flowers (1904)

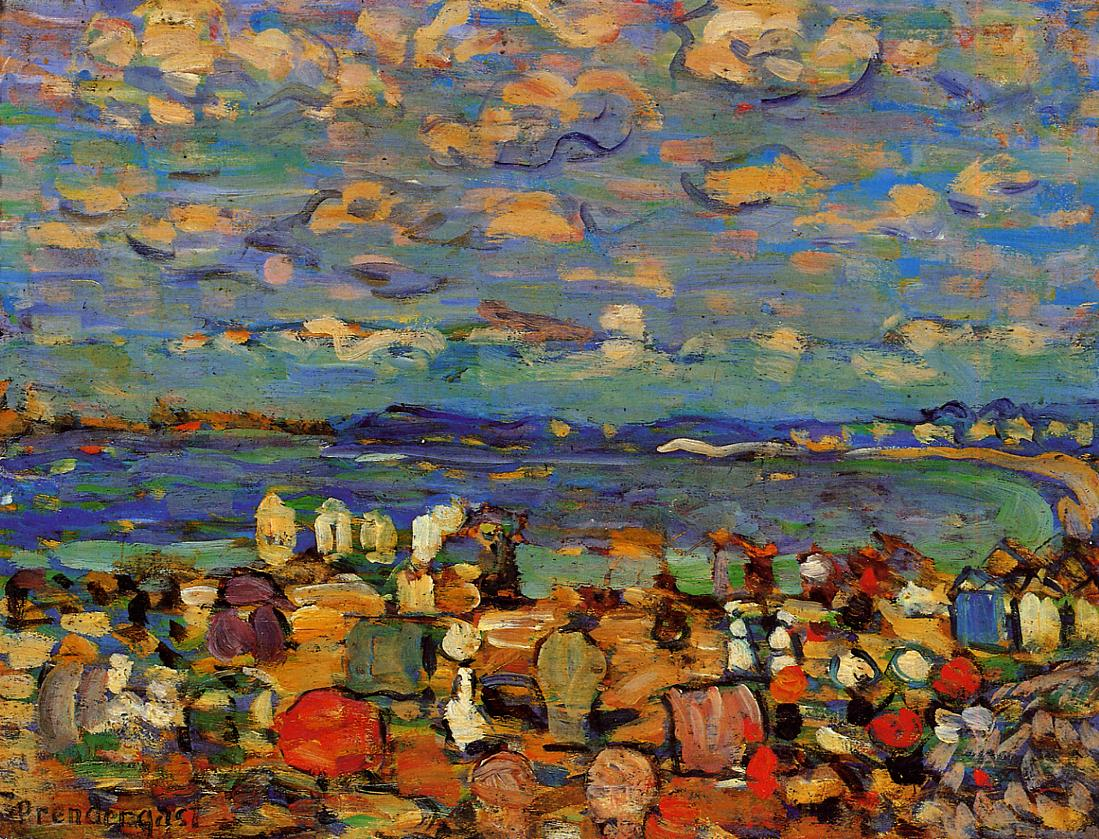
Crescent Beach (c. 1907)

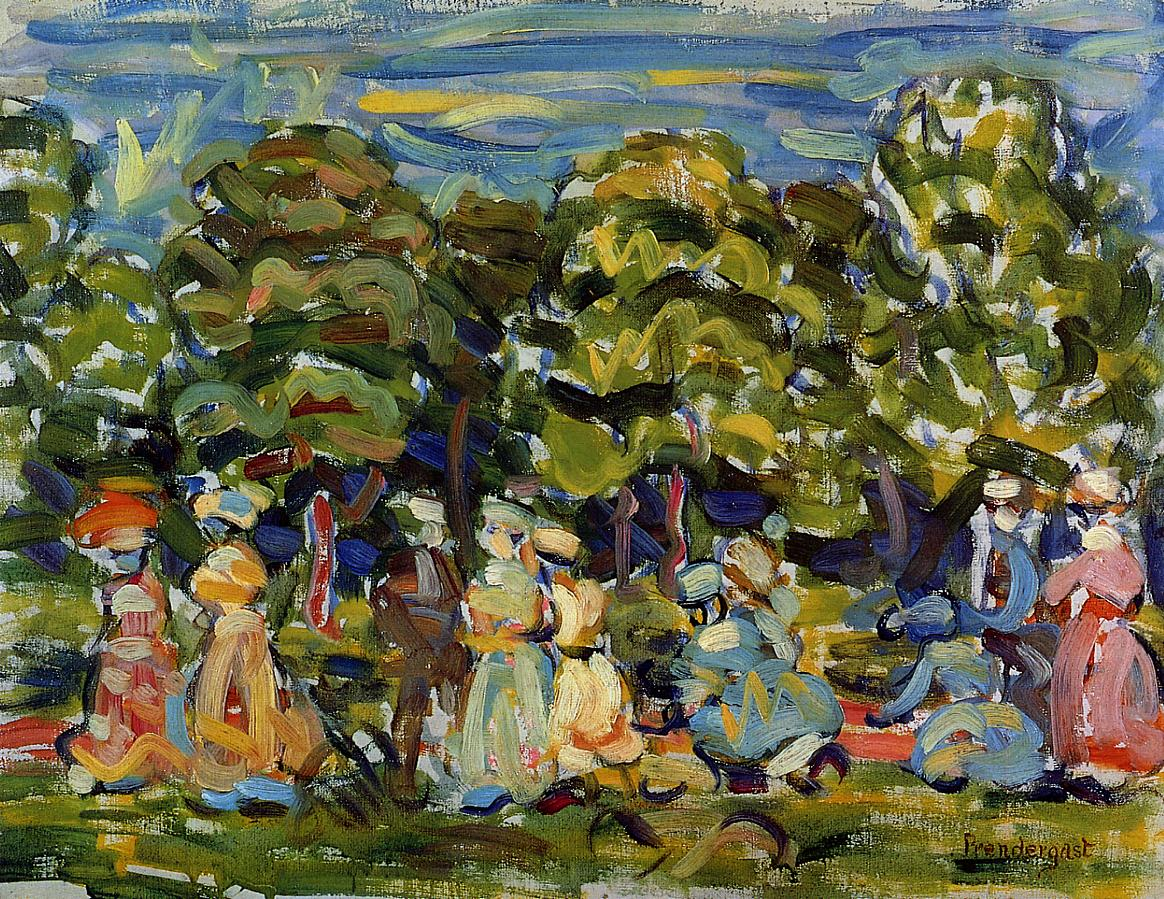
Summer in the Park (1907–10)

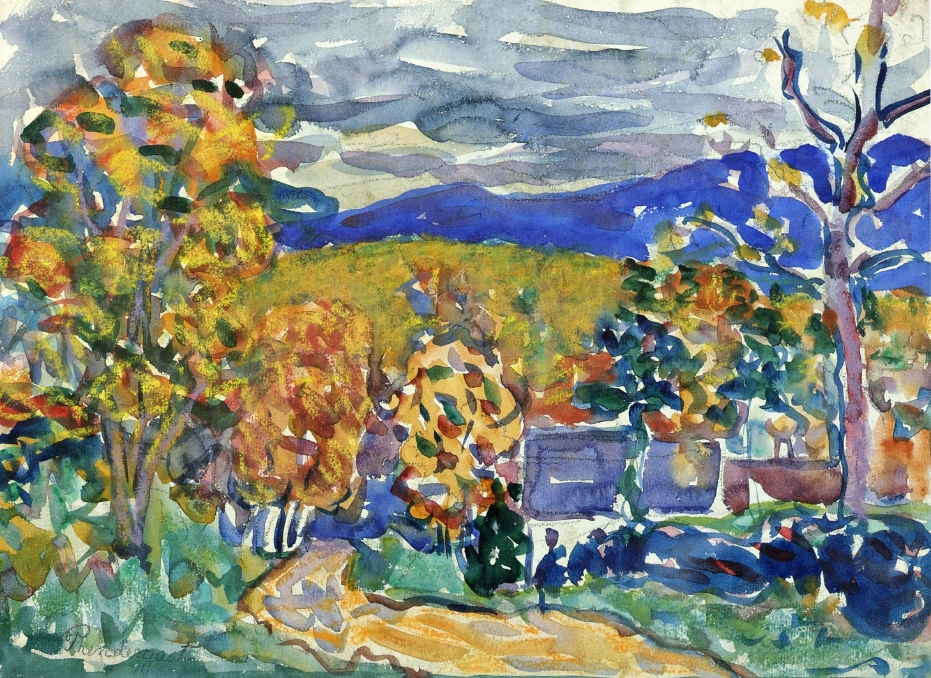
Autumn in New England (1910–13)

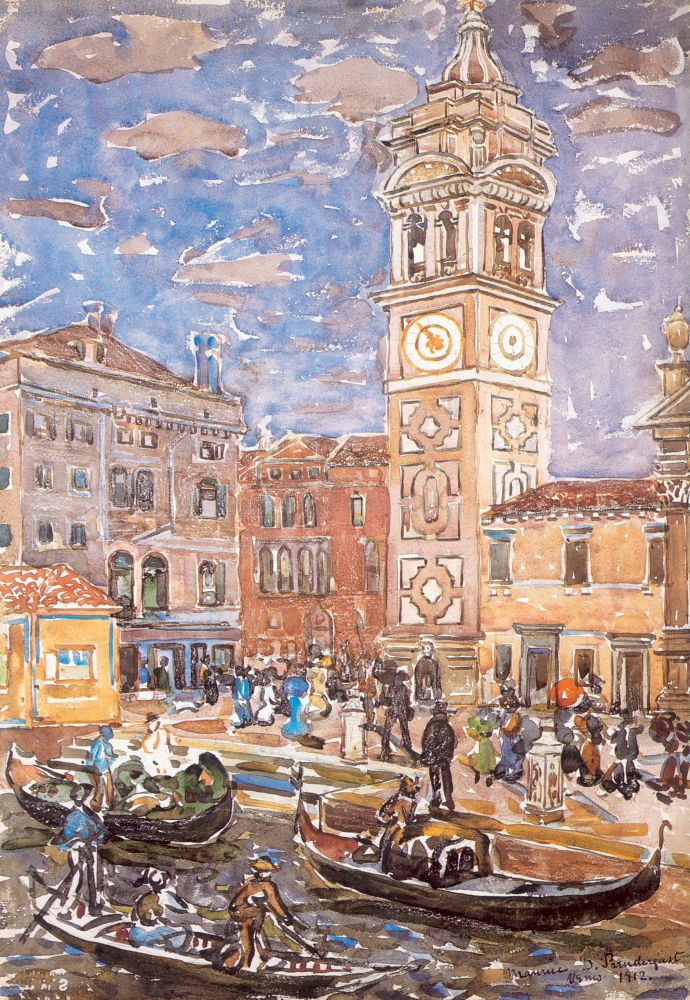
Santa Maria Formosa Venice (1911–12)

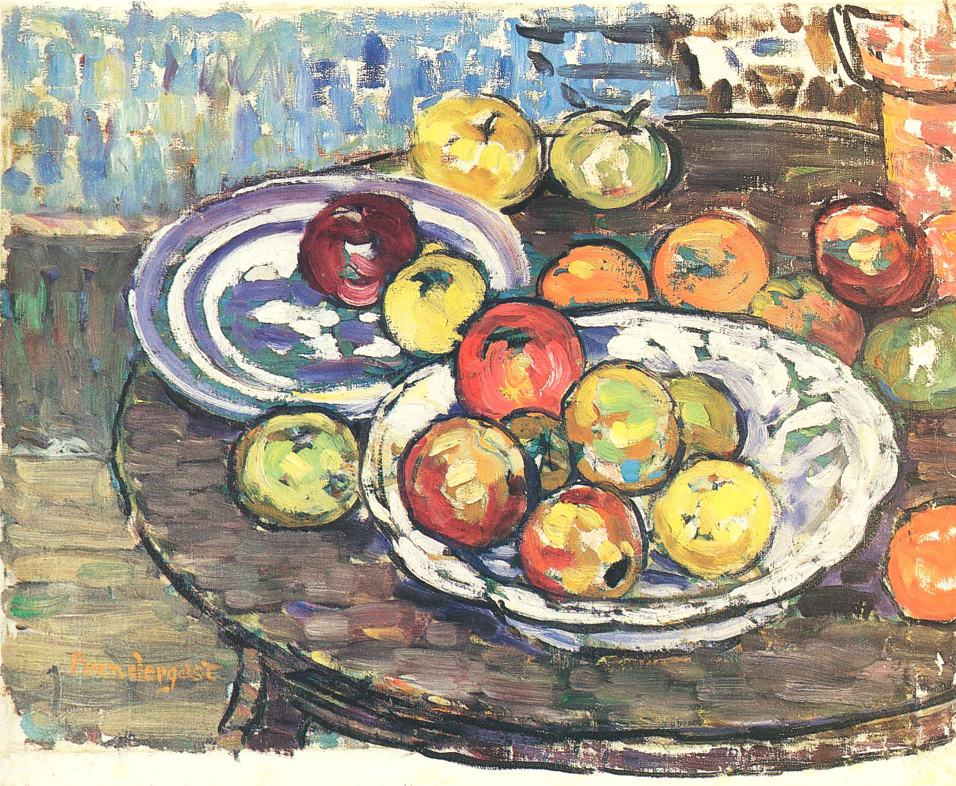
Still Life Apples Vase (1913–15)

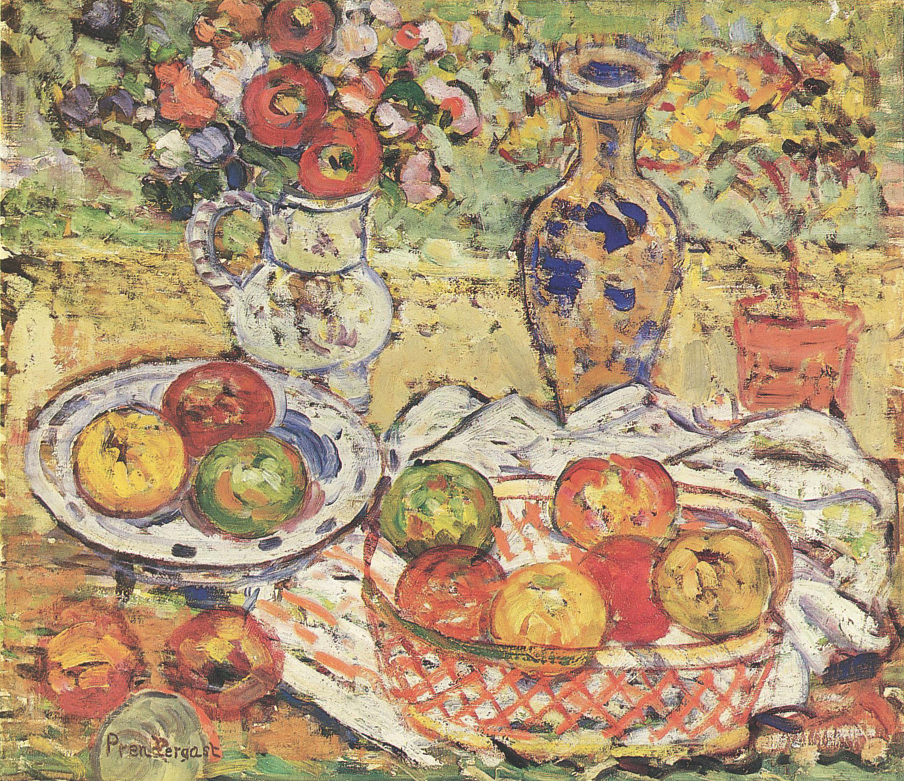
Still Life w Apples (1913–15)

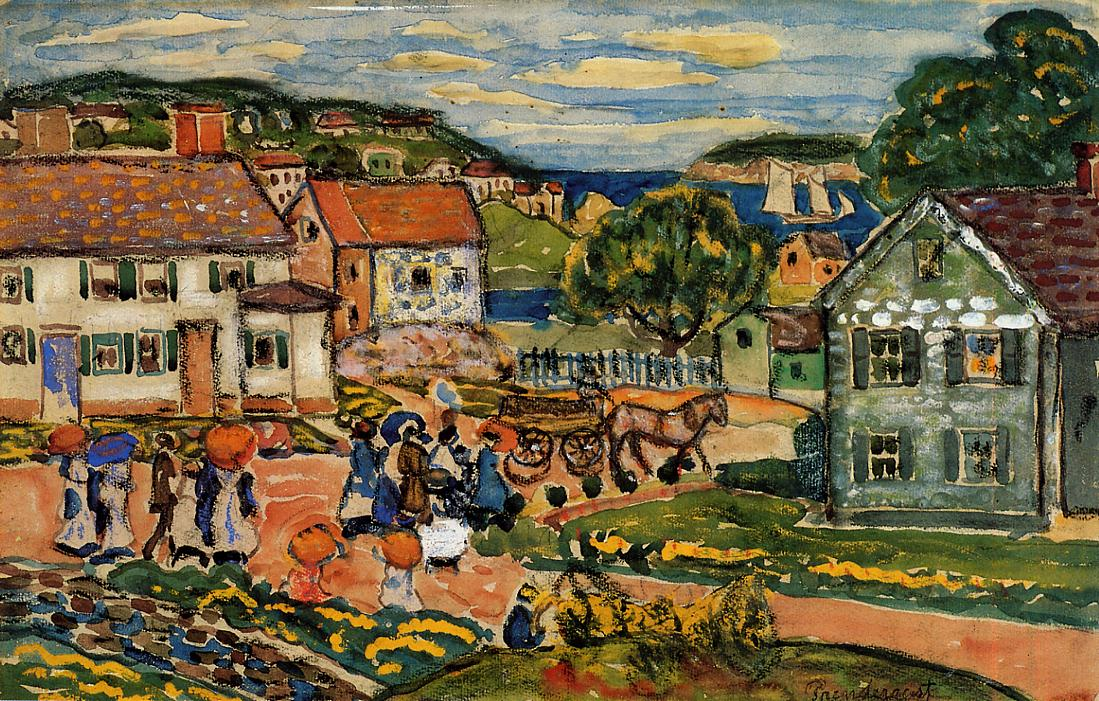
Marblehead (1914–15)

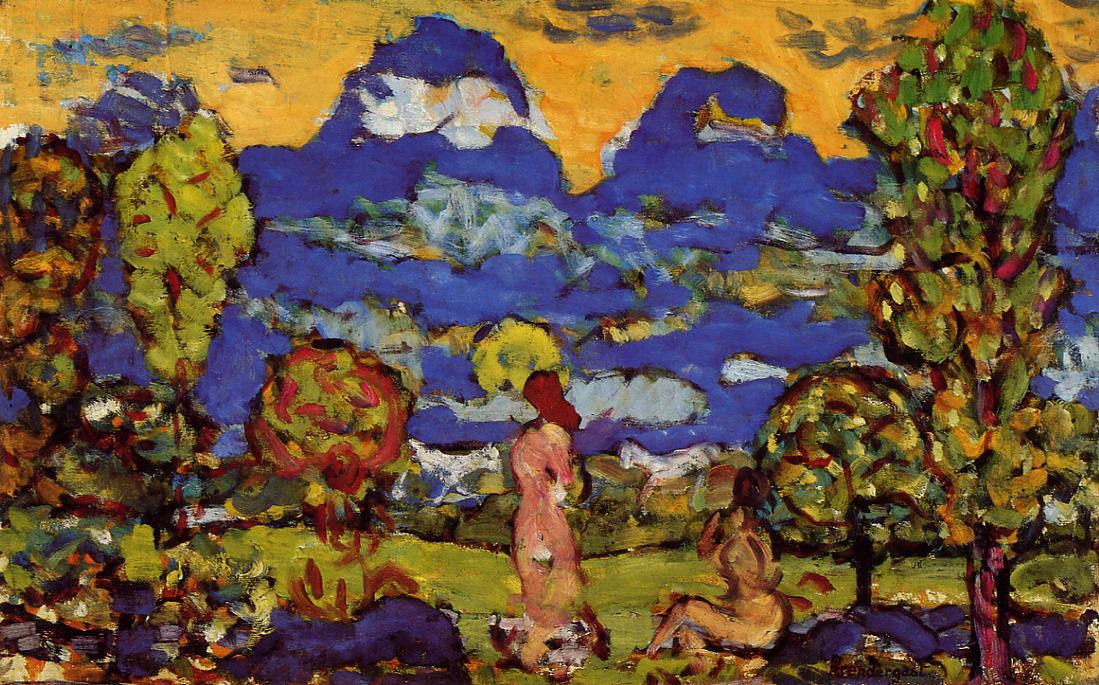
Blue Mountains (1914–1915)

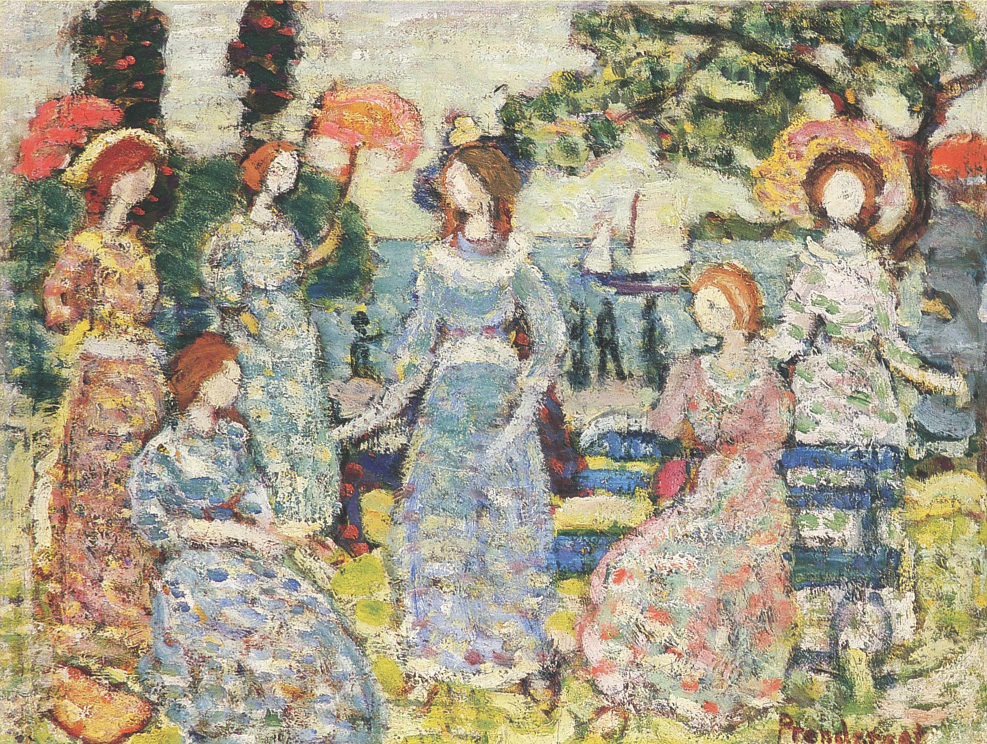
The Grove (1915)

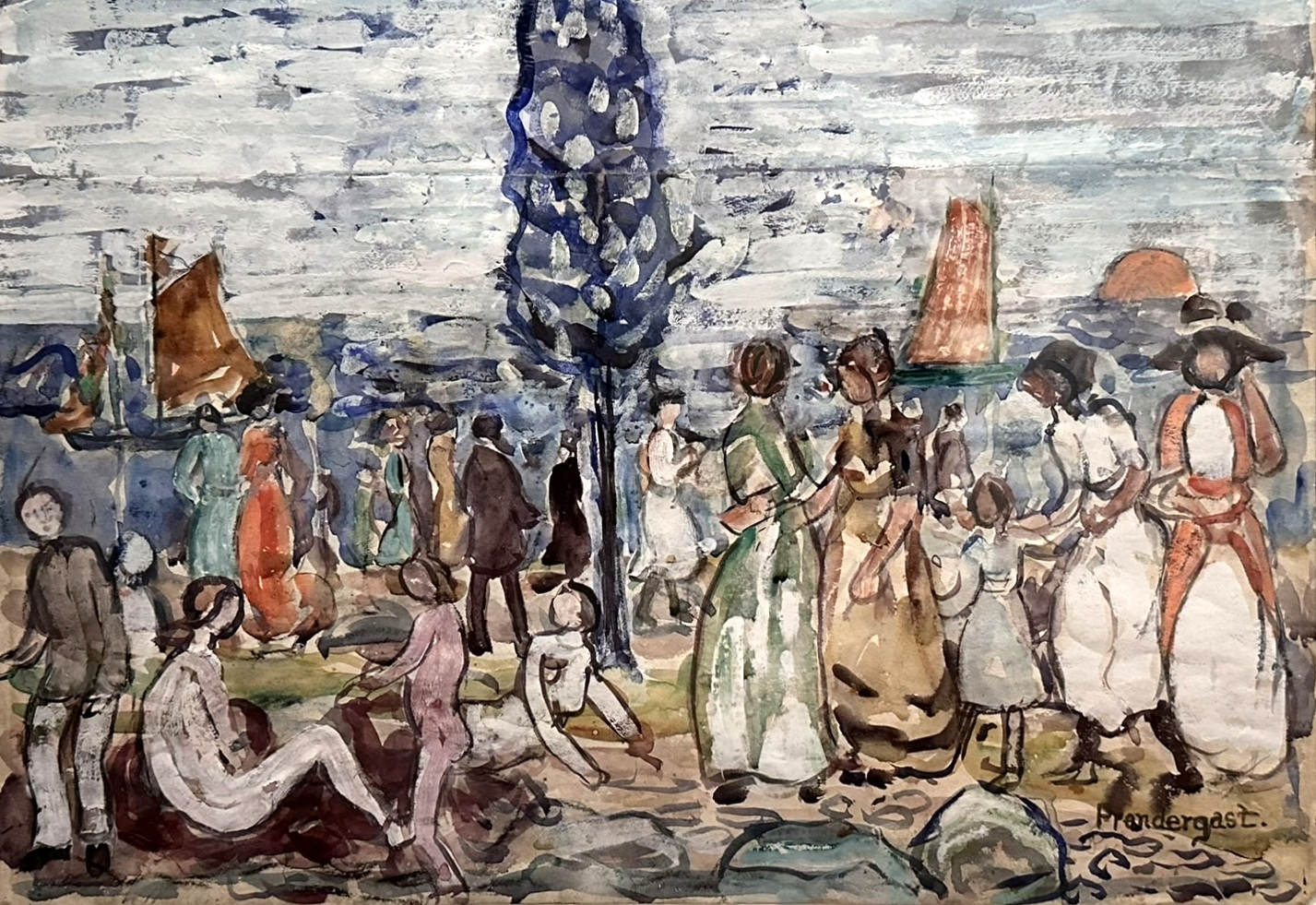
Beach with Blue Tree (1917–18)

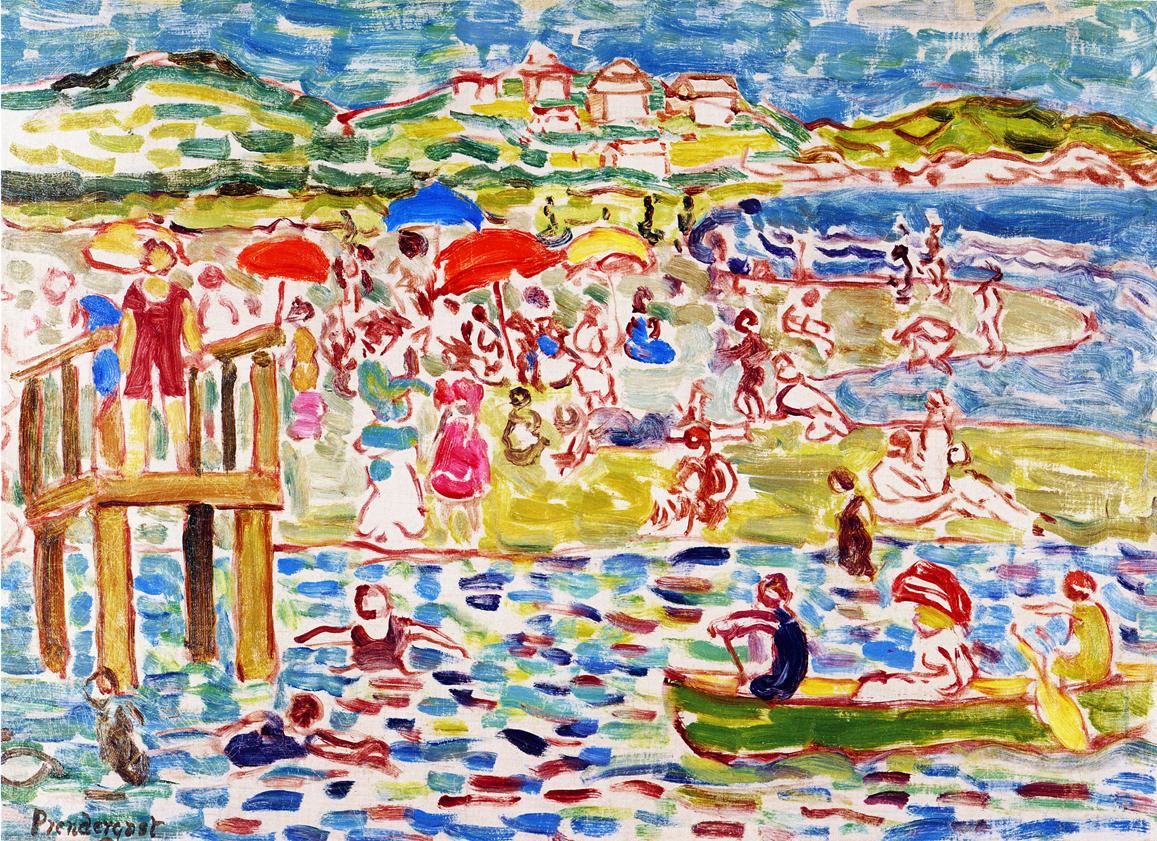
The Bathers (1918–23)

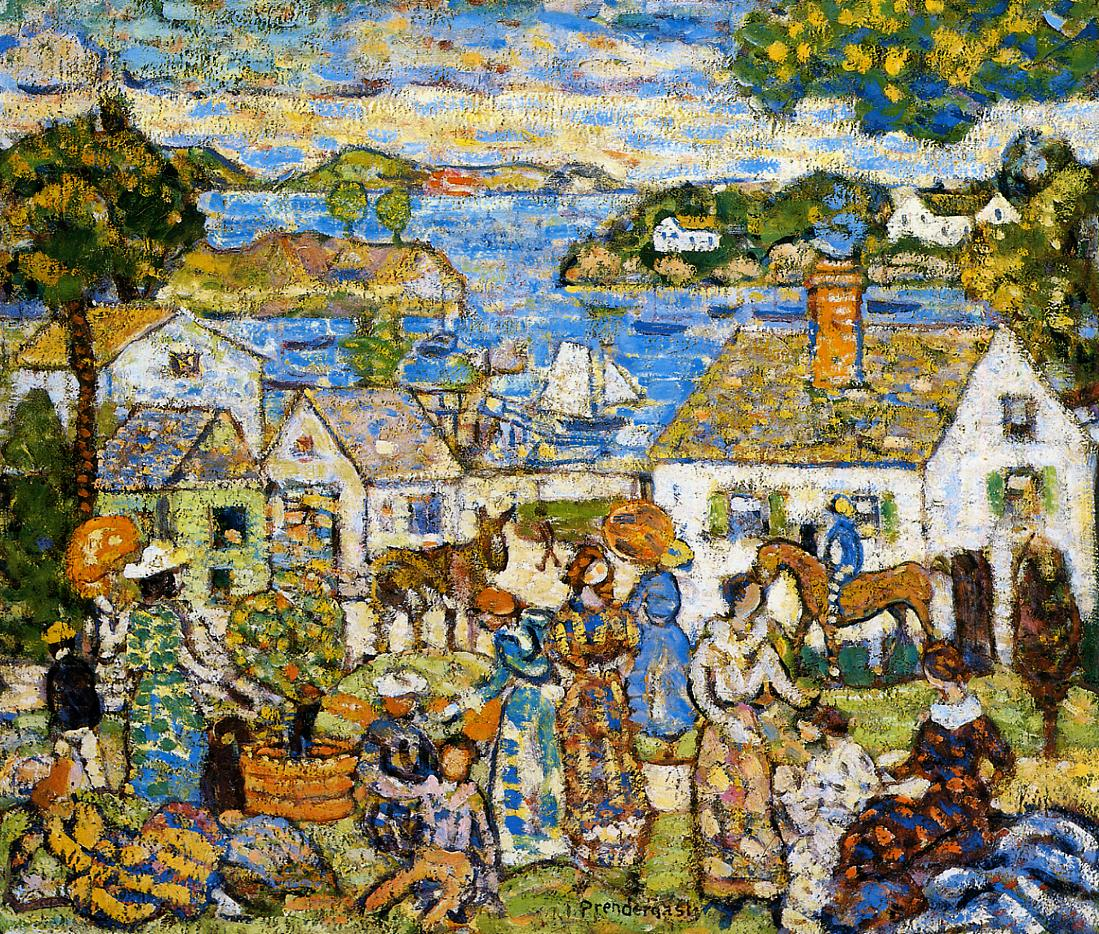
New England Harbor (1919–23)

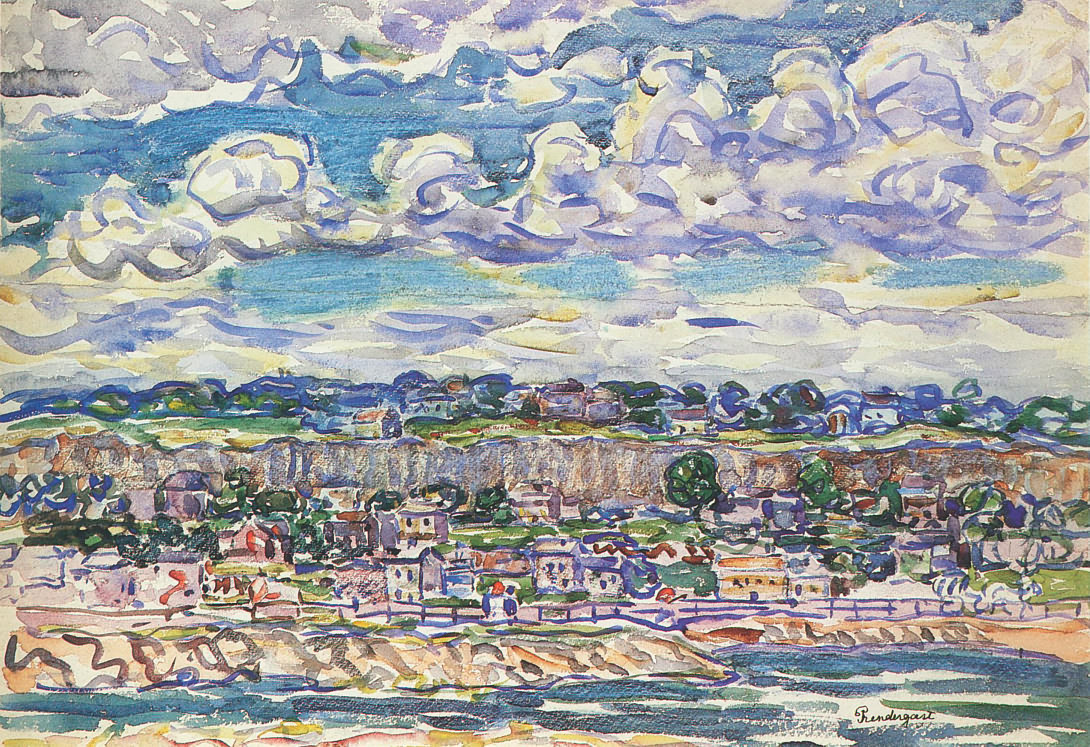
St. Malo (Unknown)

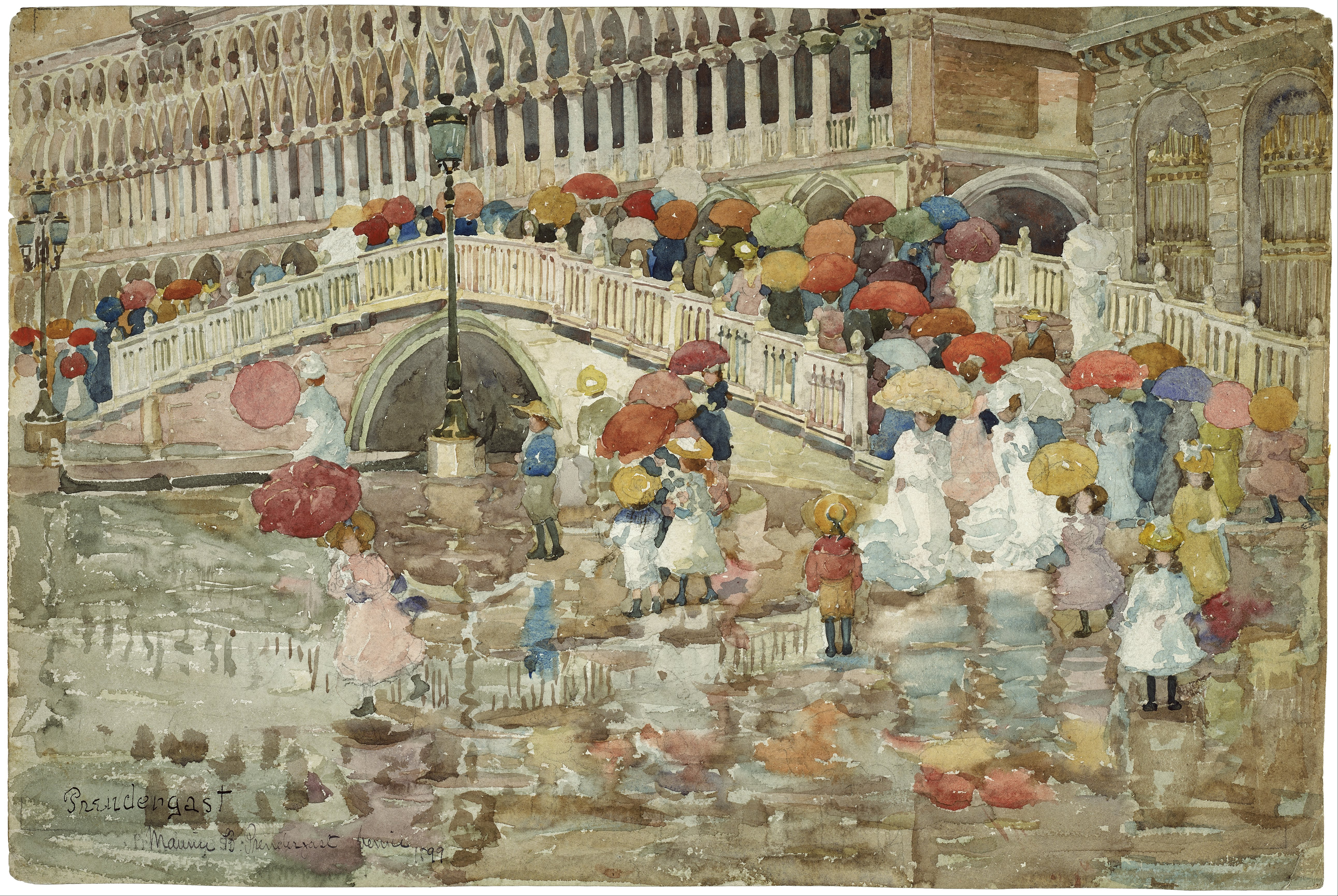
Umbrellas in the Rain 1899 watercolor Museum of Fine Arts Boston

== Sources ==
- Kennedy, Elizabeth. "Maurice B. Prendergast: The Modern Spirit" (pp. 109–119) in Elizabeth Kennedy (ed.), The Eight and American Modernisms (Chicago: University of Chicago Press, 2009).
- Mathews, Nancy Mowll. Maurice Prendergast. New York: Prestel/Williams College Museum of Art, 1990.
- Roberts, Norma J. (ed.). The American Collections. Columbus, OH: Columbus Museum of Art, 1988.
