= Robert John Simmons =

U.S. Army soldier

First Sergeant Robert John Simmons was a Bermudian who served in the 54th Massachusetts Volunteer Infantry Regiment during the American Civil War. He died in August 1863, as a result of wounds received in an attack on Fort Wagner, near Charleston, South Carolina.

== Biography ==
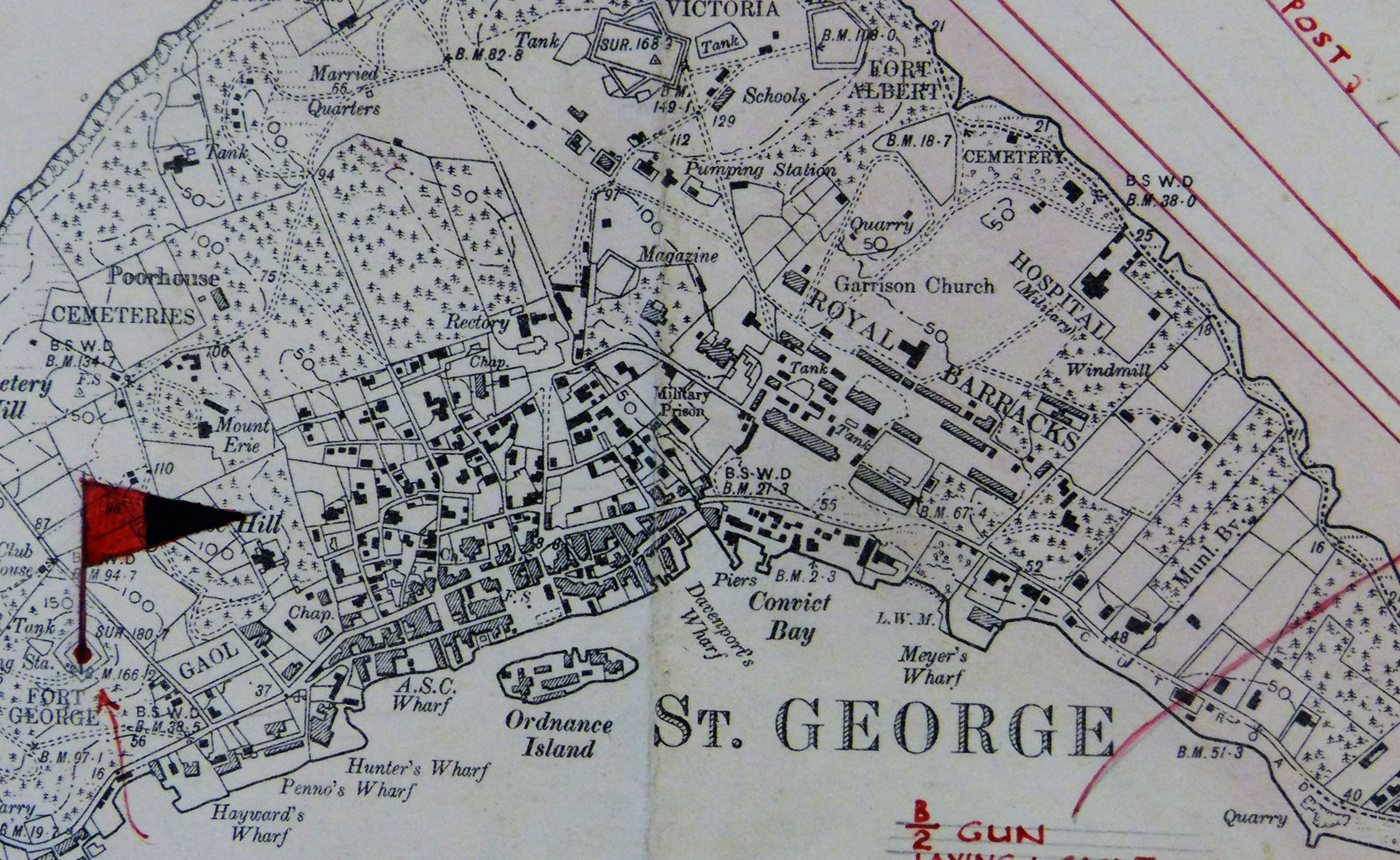
Simmons was raised in St. George's, a garrison town where the oldest of the British Army Bermuda Garrison's three main camps in Bermuda was located

A former clerk, probably from St. George's town, in the British Imperial fortress colony of Bermuda, Simmons joined the 54th on March 12, 1863. Many black and white Bermudians fought for the Union, mostly in the US Navy. Other black Bermudians who served in the United States Army during the war included Robert Tappin (who had previously served in the US Navy from 1863 to 1864), John Wilson and Joseph Thomas of the 31st Colored Infantry Regiment, John Thompson of the 26th Colored Infantry, Wate O. Harris, of the 6th Coloured Infantry, and George Smith. The links of the people of Bermuda with the southern states were foundational, with their archipelago having been settled in 1609-1612 by the Virginia Company as an extension of Jamestown, with the Carolinas (and Charleston) having been settled from Bermuda in 1670 by settlers under William Sayle, and with most of the 10,000 emigrants from Bermuda between settlement and the gaining of independence by the United States having settled in the South. The ties with Virginia and South Carolina were especially close, and Bermuda's wealthy merchant families had established branches in important Southern Atlantic ports to control trade through those cities and otherwise play important roles (examples including two of the sons of prominent Bermudian Colonel Henry Tucker (1713–1787), St. George Tucker (1752-1827), and Thomas Tudor Tucker (1745-1828)). The second-oldest surviving house in Charleston, Pink House, was built from Bermudian limestone in at some point between 1694 and 1712 (as Bermuda produced nothing but ships, its vessels often carried stone from the archipelago as ballast to be exchanged for cargo in continental ports, and Bermuda stone is found in other seventeenth century properties in Charleston, including the McLeod Plantation on James Island). Denmark Vesey also came to Charleston from Bermuda. Less wealthy Bermudians settled sometimes together, founding towns, and there are now many locations in the South that have been named after the islands of Bermuda. The close ties of blood and trade between Bermuda and the South meant most white Bermudians, at least, had strong sympathies with the South and the colony's proximity to southern ports like Charleston made it the ideal location from which to smuggle European manufactured weapons into the South and cotton out. Consequently, many other Bermudians, like Thomas Leslie Outerbridge, profiteered from the war by smuggling arms to the blockaded South. Its close connection to his birthplace was an ironic twist to Simmons' death in Charleston.

The black 54th Massachusetts Volunteer Infantry Regiment was raised in March 1863 by the governor of Massachusetts, John A. Andrew. Commanded by Colonel Robert Gould Shaw, it sprang to life after the passage of the Emancipation Proclamation. Secretary of War Edwin M. Stanton decided white officers would be in charge of all "colored" units. Colonel Shaw was hand picked by Governor John Andrew. Governor Andrew also selected Norwood Penrose "Pen" Hallowell as the unit's second in command.

Simmons was introduced to Francis George Shaw, father of Colonel Shaw, by William Wells Brown, a prominent abolitionist lecturer, novelist, playwright, historian and former slave, who described him as "a young man of more than ordinary abilities who had learned the science of war in the British Army". In his book, The Negro in the American Rebellion, Brown wrote that "Francis George Shaw remarked at the time that Simmons would make a 'valuable soldier'. Col. Shaw also had a high opinion of him".

Bermuda had been defended primarily by militia from 1612 until the French Revolution, although the regular English Army (subsequently the British Army) had kept a company-strength infantry force there from 1701 until the end of the American War of Independence. The Royal Navy, however, identified Bermuda as the only available replacement for all the bases and seaports it had lost between The Maritimes and the West Indies. Bermuda lies 1,070 km (665 mi) east-southeast of Cape Hatteras, North Carolina,1,236 km (768 mi) south of Cape Sable Island, Canada, and 1,544 km (959 mi) north of Road Town, British Virgin Islands. What would become the headquarters, primary naval base, and dockyard of the North America and West Indies Squadron was established in the colony in 1795, leading to a rapidly growing British Army Bermuda Garrison tasked with protecting the naval base, and keeping the colony out of the hands of an enemy. With the large number of regular soldiers present, the Government of Bermuda allowed the Militia to lapse after the American War of 1812, and no amount of cajoling, begging, or threatening by the British Government could move it to replace the military reserve until the 1890s, when the Bermuda Militia Artillery (BMA) and Bermuda Volunteer Rifle Corps (BVRC) (amalgamated in 1965 into what is now the Royal Bermuda Regiment) were raised. Without the assistance or funds of the colonial government, the Governor (who was also military Commander-in-Chief) and the Bermuda Garrison of the British Army employed many (mostly short-lived) schemes during the intervening decades to recruit Bermudians into the regular army and the Board of Ordnance Military Corps for part-time, local-service, to reinforce the regular soldiers. Most of the volunteers were blacks. The relatively lower volunteering rate of whites was a recurring phenomenon as late as the First World War (when the first of the black-recruited BMA's two contingents sent to France numbered 201 officers and other ranks, more than the two First World War and the two Second World War overseas contingents of the all-white BVRC combined...although many white Bermudians also served in the Home Forces, from which non-whites were generally barred). Simmons probably served under one of these schemes, recruited into the regular army but for local service only, and would have been trained in light infantry tactics.

=== Fort Wagner ===
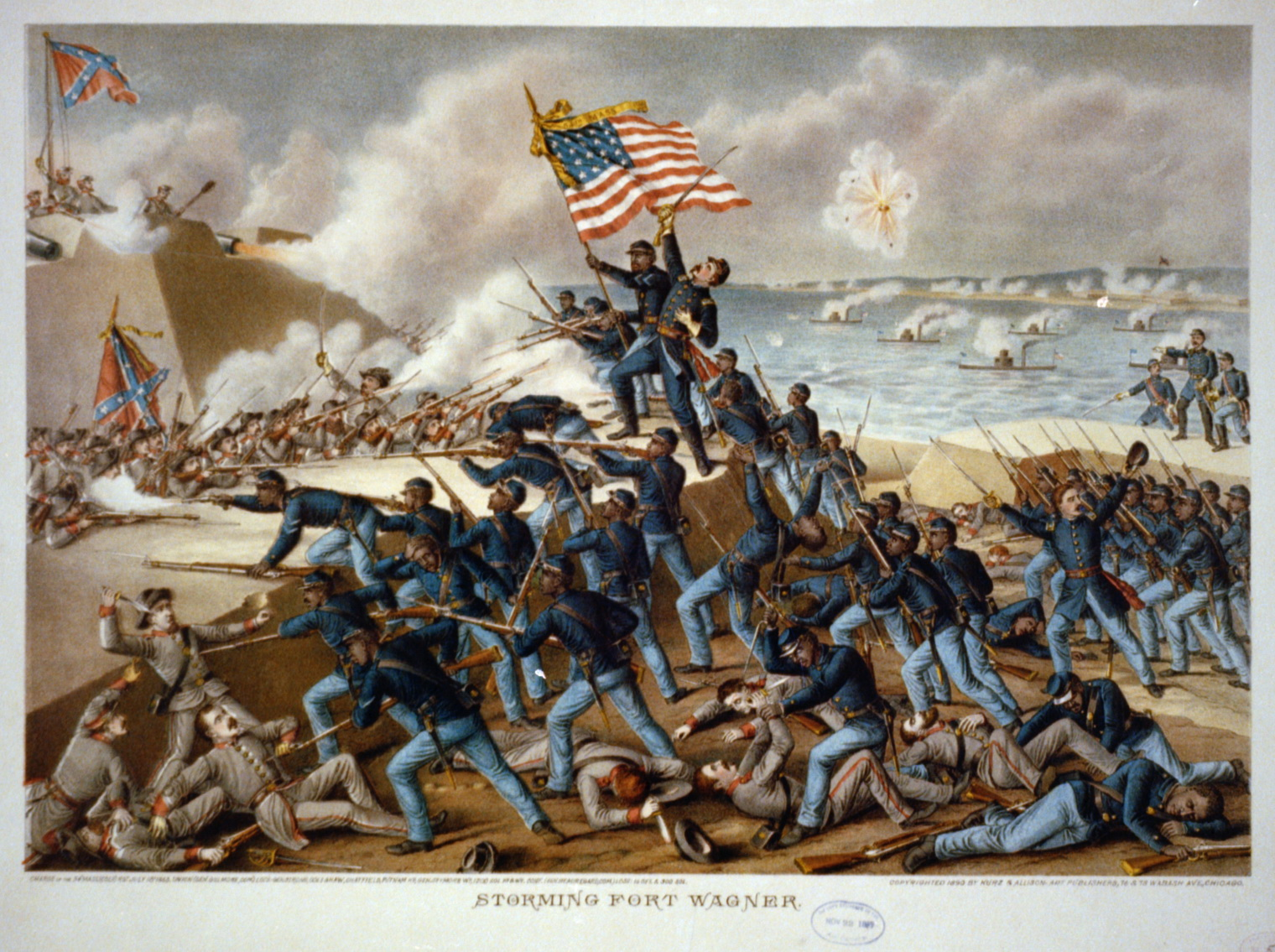
The Storming of Fort Wagner, the most famous battle fought by the 54th Massachusetts.

The regiment gained recognition on July 18, 1863, when it spearheaded an assault on Fort Wagner near Charleston, South Carolina. Colonel Shaw was killed, along with one-hundred and sixteen of his men. Another hundred and fifty-six were wounded or captured. The total casualties of 272 was the highest for the 54th in a single engagement during the war. Although they were not able to capture the fort, the 54th was widely acclaimed for its valor, and the event helped encourage the further enlistment and mobilization of African-American troops, a key development that President Abraham Lincoln once noted as helping to secure the final victory.

A letter to his wife written by First Sergeant Simmons after the Battle of Grimball's Landing and shortly before the attack on Battery Wagner was published in the New York Tribune on 23 December 1863.

Folly Island, South Carolina

July 18, 1863;

We are on the march to Fort Wagner, to storm it. We have just completed our successful retreat from James Island; we fought a desperate battle there Thursday morning. Three companies of us, B, H, and K, were out on picket about a good mile in advance of the regiment. We were attacked early in the morning. Our company was in the reserve, when the outposts were attacked by rebel infantry and cavalry. I was sent out by our Captain in command of a squad of men to support the left flank. The bullets fairly rained around us; when I got there the poor fellows were falling down around me, with pitiful groans. Our pickets only numbered about 250 men, attacked by about 900. It is supposed by the line of battle in the distance, that they were supported by reserve of 3,000 men. We had to fire and retreat toward our own encampment. One poor Sergeant of ours was shot down alongside of me; several others were wounded near me.

God has protected me through this, my first fiery, leaden trial, and I do give Him the glory, and render my praises unto His holy name. My poor friend [Sergeant Peter] Vogelsang is shot through the lungs; his case is critical, but the doctor says he may probably live. His company suffered very much. Poor good and brave Sergeant (Joseph D.) Wilson of his company [H], after killing four rebels with his bayonet, was shot through the head by the fifth one. Poor fellow! May his noble spirit rest in peace. The General has complimented the Colonel on the galantry and bravery of his regiment.

At roughly the same time as the events that First Sergeant Simmons described took place, his seven year old nephew was murdered in New York during the four days of race riots that followed the 13 July.

First Sergeant Simmons himself was among the casualties of the battle for Fort Wagner. He was wounded and captured by the Confederates. Although not mentioned by name in an article in the 28 July 1863 edition of the weekly Columbus Enquirer, he was described as a Bermudian sergeant, leaving no doubt as to his identity: One of the negroes is a remarkably sprightly fellow from Bermuda where he was educated as a soldier. His position is that of an Orderly Sergeant, but he has lost an arm, and probably one leg will go. A third of the `glory' for which he says he came to fight, being thus amputated, he will in the future be a wiser man. The others are a mongrel set of trash and very fair representatives of the common type of free Northern negro.

Of his own officers, Captain Luis F. Emilio, the most junior Captain of the 54th who had been left in charge during the attack by the deaths or wounding of all of his superiors, in A Brave Black Regiment wrote: It is due, however, to the following-named enlisted men that they be recorded above their fellows for especial merit: [1st] Sgt. Robert J. Simmons, [Col.] Sgt. William H. Carney... Emilio also wrote: First Sergeant Simmons of Company B was the finest-looking soldier in the 54th Mass.--a brave man, and of good education. He was wounded and captured. Taken to Charleston, his [military] bearing impressed even his captors. After suffering amputation of the arm, he died there.

Simmons also received special mention by Shaw's successor, Norwood Hallowell's brother, Colonel Hallowell. As Colonel Thomas Wentworth Higginson would write in Massachusetts in the Army and Navy, 1861-65: 1st Sgt. R.J. Simmons... [was] especially complimented in the report of Lt. Col. Hallowell, who was left in command. Simmons was also awarded a private medal. He died of his wounds in August, 1863, at the age of 26.

== Legacy ==
In 1989, the Academy Award-winning film Glory, which told the story of the 54th, but did not mention Simmons. The film starred Matthew Broderick as Shaw, Denzel Washington, Morgan Freeman, Cary Elwes, and Andre Braugher. The film re-established the now-popular image of the combat role African-Americans played in the Civil War, and the unit, often represented in historical battle reenactments, now has the nickname The Glory Regiment. First Sergeant Simmons is mentioned repeatedly in a documentary narrated by Glory actor Morgan Freeman, The True Story of Glory.
