= William Harvey Carney =

American soldier (1840–1908)

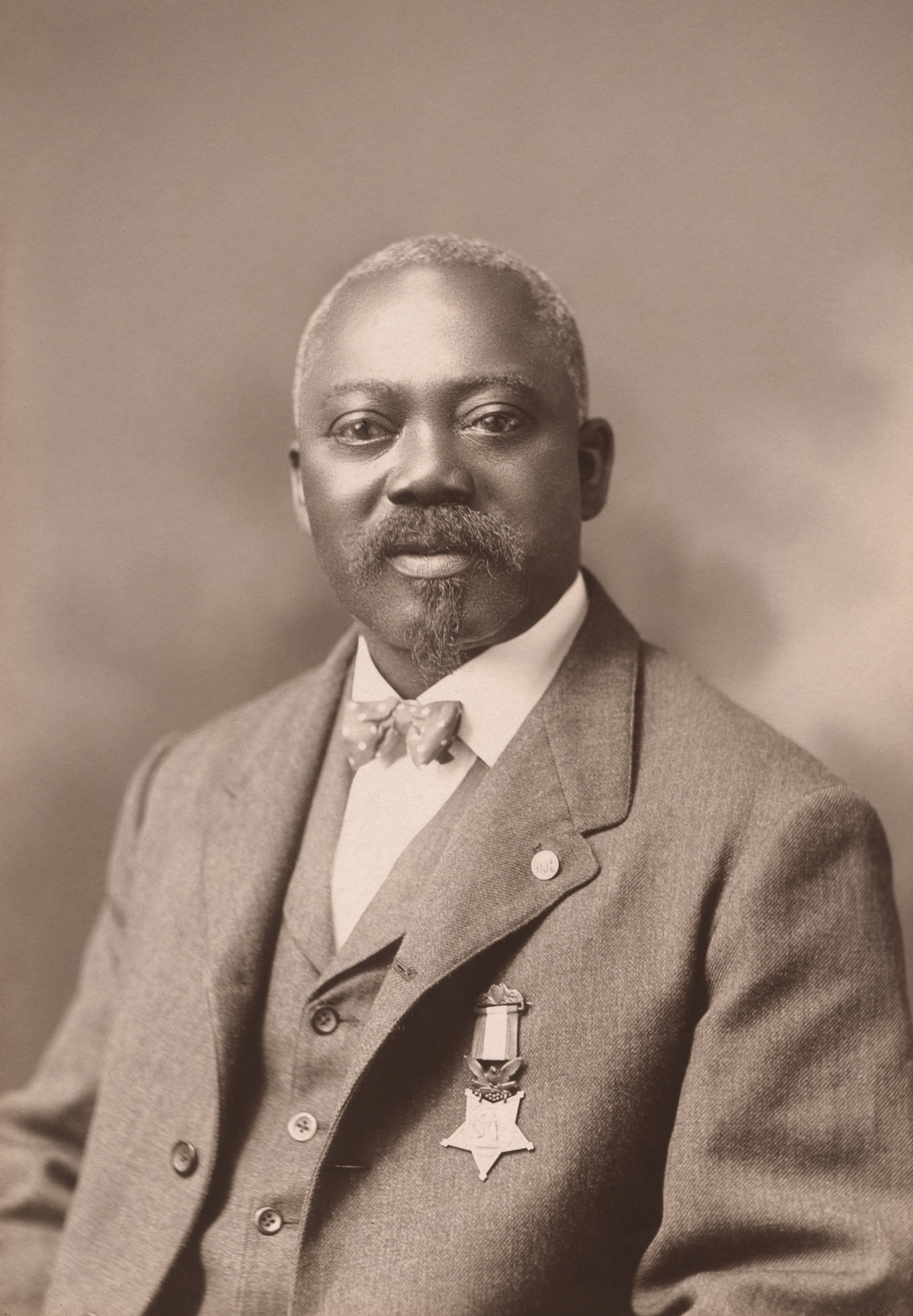
- Carney, wearing the Medal of Honor he received in 1900
- Born: February 29, 1840; Norfolk, Virginia, U.S.
- Died: December 9, 1908 (aged 68); New Bedford, Massachusetts, U.S.
- Burial place: Oak Grove Cemetery, New Bedford, Massachusetts, U.S.
- Military career
- Allegiance: United States (Union)
- Branch: U.S. Army (Union Army)
- Service years: 1863–1864
- Rank: Sergeant
- Unit: 54th Regiment Massachusetts Volunteer Infantry
- Conflicts: American Civil War: Second Battle of Fort Wagner
- Awards: Medal of Honor

William Harvey Carney (February 29, 1840 – December 9, 1908) was an American soldier during the American Civil War. Born enslaved, he was awarded the Medal of Honor in 1900 for his gallantry in saving the regimental colors during the Battle of Fort Wagner in 1863. The action for which he received the Medal of Honor preceded that of any other African American Medal of Honor recipient; however, his medal was actually one of the last to be awarded for Civil War service. Some African Americans received the Medal of Honor as early as April 1865.

== Biography ==
William Harvey Carney was born into slavery in Norfolk, Virginia, on February 29, 1840. How he made his way to freedom is not certain. According to most accounts, he escaped through the Underground Railroad, and joined his father in Massachusetts. Other members of their family were freed by purchase or by the death of their master.

=== Civil War ===
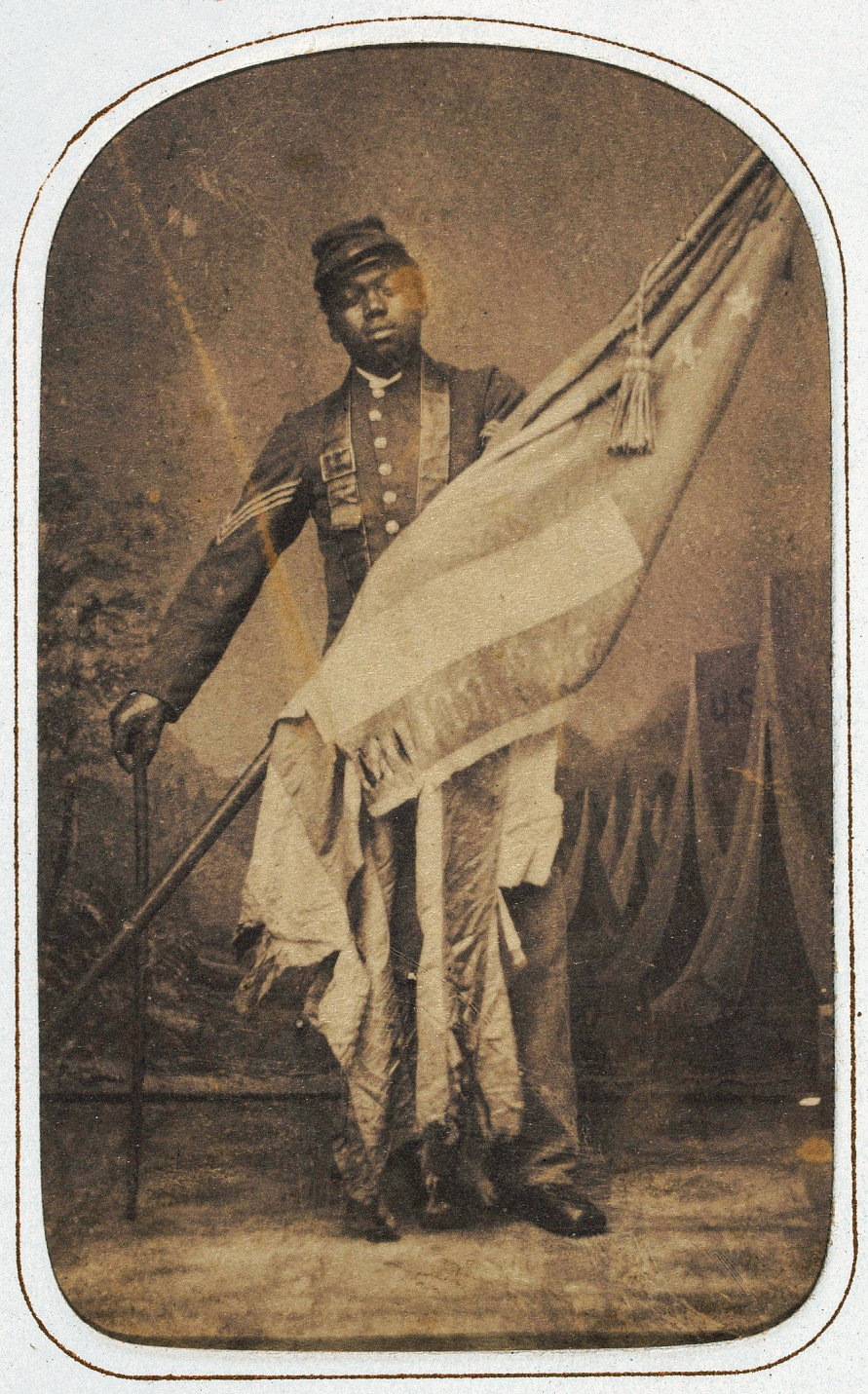
Carney in c. 1864

Carney joined the 54th Massachusetts Volunteer Infantry in March 1863 and was later promoted to sergeant due to his heroism and actions during the battle of Fort Wagner.

He took part in the July 18, 1863, assault on Fort Wagner in Charleston, South Carolina. His actions there ultimately earned him the Medal of Honor. When the color guard was killed, Carney retrieved the U.S. flag and marched forward with it, despite serious wounds. When the Union troops were forced to retreat under fire, he struggled back across the battlefield (he was shot in both his right arm and leg as well as his chest, with the last shot fired barely hitting his head), and, eventually returning to his own lines and turning over the colors to another survivor of the 54th, saying, "Boys, I only did my duty; the old flag never touched the ground!"

He received an honorable discharge due to disability from his wounds in June 1864.

=== Post-war ===
After his discharge, Carney returned to New Bedford, Massachusetts, and took a job maintaining the city's streetlights. He then delivered mail for 32 years. He was a founding vice president of the New Bedford Branch 18 of the National Association of Letter Carriers, in 1890. He married Susannah Williams, and they had a daughter, Clara Heronia. He spent a few years in California, then returned again in 1869.

Carney received his Medal of Honor on May 23, 1900, nearly 37 years after the events at Fort Wagner (more than half of such awards from the Civil War were presented 20 or more years after the fact). 20 African American men received the medal before him, but because his battle actions happened earlier than the others, some have incorrectly cited him as the first to receive the medal. His citation reads:

When the color sergeant was shot down, this soldier grasped the flag, led the way to the parapet, and planted the colors thereon. When the troops fell back he brought off the flag, under a fierce fire in which he was twice severely wounded.

In 1901, shortly after his medal was awarded, a song was published about his daring exploits: "Boys the Old Flag Never Touched the Ground".

Captain Luis F. Emilio, the most junior captain of the 54th, who had been left in charge during the attack on Battery Wagner by the deaths or wounding of all of his superiors, in his 1891 book A Brave Black Regiment wrote: "It is due, however, to the following-named enlisted men that they be recorded above their fellows for especial merit: [1st] Sgt. Robert J. Simmons, [Col.] Sgt. William H. Carney..."

Carney died at the Boston City Hospital on December 9, 1908, of complications from an elevator accident at the Massachusetts State House, where he worked for the Department of State. His body lay in repose for one day at the undertaking rooms of Walden Banks, 142 Lenox Street, at the wish of his wife and daughter. He was buried in the family plot at Oak Grove Cemetery in New Bedford, Massachusetts. Engraved on his tombstone is an image of the Medal of Honor.

== Other honors ==
A New Bedford, Massachusetts, elementary school was named in his honor, and his New Bedford home at 128 Mill Street is listed on the National Register of Historic Places. His statue, along with Private Milton L. Olive, is seen on the African-American Medal of Honor Recipients Memorial in Wilmington, Delaware.

Sgt. Carney's statue is also prominently featured in his hometown at West Point Cemetery (Norfolk, Virginia), atop a monument to African American Civil War and Spanish American War veterans.

In 2015, Carney was honored as one of the Library of Virginia's "Strong Men & Women in Virginia History" because of his actions during the Civil War. Carney's regiment is represented in the Memorial to Robert Gould Shaw and the Massachusetts Fifty-Fourth Regiment, located on the Boston Common and designed by Augustus Saint Gaudens.

== See also ==
- "Boys The Old Flag Never Touched The Ground", a commemorative song
- List of American Civil War Medal of Honor recipients: A–F
- List of enslaved people
