= William Cebolt =

- Born: February 12, 1835; Jackson, Tennessee, US
- Died: April 10, 1918
- Burial place: Crown Point Cemetery Kokomo, Indiana
- Military career
- Allegiance: United States: Union Army
- Service years: 1863-1865
- Rank: Private
- Unit: 54th Massachusetts Volunteer Infantry: Company D

William Cebolt (February 12, 1835 - April 10, 1918) was an African American soldier in the 54th Massachusetts Volunteer Infantry Company D during the American Civil War.

== Biography ==
William Cebolt was born on February 12, 1835, in Jackson, Tennessee to father Henry Cebolt and mother Mary Perkins, née Reeves. Henry Cebolt died soon after William's birth and he was raised by his mother and step-father, Burrell Perkins.

In 1857, Cebolt married Martha, née Reeves, daughter of Mary née Jones and Allen Davis. The couple had five children, two in Indiana and three after re-locating to Battle Creek, Michigan. After divorcing, both married again, Cebolt to Sarah, née Tusing on March 16, 1885, in Clark County, Illinois. On June 18, 1905, after both are widowed, Cebolt and Martha, née Reeves remarry. After Cebolt became a widower again, he marries Martha, née Harvey on February 23, 1907, in Indiana.

== Military service ==
Private Cebolt enlisted in the 54th Massachusetts on October 9, 1863. In the roster entry, he indicated that he was 27 years old, single and worked as a farmer from New Bedford, Massachusetts. He was discharged on May 29, 1865, from St. Andrews Parish, South Carolina.
