= George Stevens (disambiguation) =

George Stevens (1904–1975) was an American film director, producer, screenwriter and cinematographer.

George Stevens may also refer to:

== Arts and entertainment ==
- George Alexander Stevens (1710–1780), English actor, playwright, poet, and songwriter
- George Alex Stevens (1875–1954), British songwriter and musical show director
- George Stevens Jr. (born 1932), American film and television writer, director, producer, and founder of the American Film Institute
- George Stevens (EastEnders), fictional character in EastEnders
- George "Kingfish" Stevens, a principal fictional character of the Amos 'n' Andy radio and television programs

== Law and politics ==
- George Stevens (1803–1894), Massachusetts pipe organ manufacturer and politician
- George Stevens (Massachusetts politician), American politician and lawyer
- George P. Stevens (1851–1927), Wisconsin State Assemblyman
- George Asher Stevens (1856–1920), American hotelier and New York State Assemblyman
- George Stevens (California politician) (1932–2006), San Diego City Council member, minister, activist

== Sports ==
- George Stevens (jockey) (1833–1871), English jockey
- George Stevens (Scottish footballer) (1891–?), footballer for Darlington and Crewe
- George Stevens (English footballer) (1910–1987), footballer for New Brighton, Everton, Southend, Stockport and Crewe
- George Stevens (Australian footballer) (born 2005), Australian rules footballer

== Others ==
- George W. Stevens (1834–1897), American civil engineer and architect
- George Barker Stevens (1854–1906), American clergyman, theologian and Yale Divinity School professor
- George Phillip Stevens (1861–1941), public servant in Australia
- George Bridges Stevens (fl. 1920s), acting commander of the Ceylon Defence Force

== See also ==
- George Stephens (disambiguation)
