= Sgt. William H. Carney House =

Historic house in Massachusetts, United States

- U.S. National Register of Historic Places
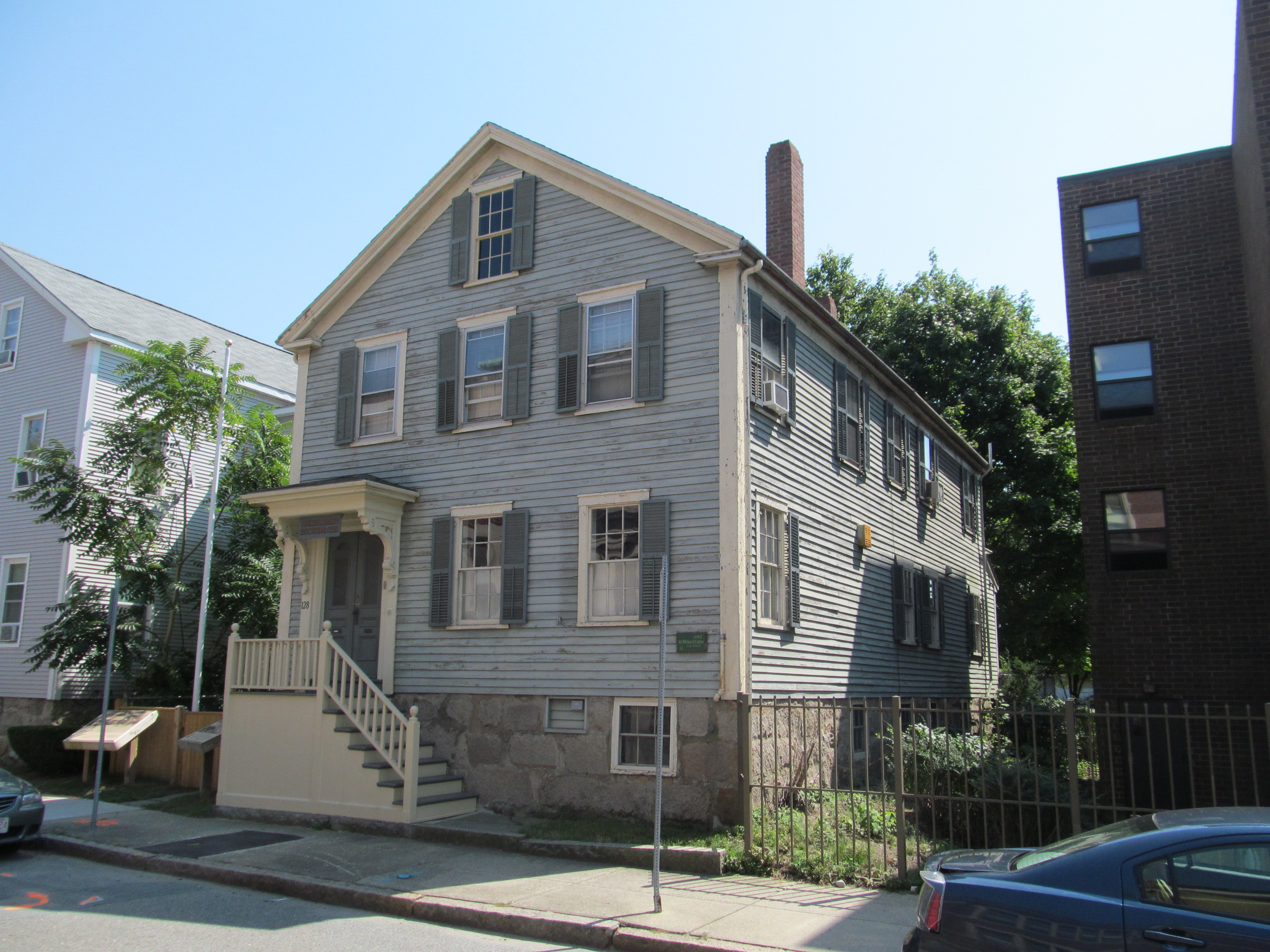
- Sgt. William H. Carney House

- Location within Massachusetts Location within the United States
- Location: New Bedford, Massachusetts
- Coordinates: 41°38′15″N 70°55′59″W
- Built: 1850
- NRHP reference No.: 75000243
- Added to NRHP: April 21, 1975

The Sgt. William H. Carney House is a historic house at 128 Mill Street in New Bedford, Massachusetts. The house was built in 1856, and is a 2 1/2-story wood-frame structure with Greek Revival styling.

== History ==
It has a three-bay front facade, with the entrance in the left bay, sheltered by a hip-roofed bracketed hood.

It is notable as the home of William Harvey Carney, an enlistee in the African-American 54th Massachusetts Volunteer Infantry. Carney distinguished himself at the Battle of Fort Wagner, actions for which he was belatedly awarded the Medal of Honor.

The house was listed on the National Register of Historic Places in 1975.

== See also ==
- National Register of Historic Places listings in New Bedford, Massachusetts
