= George Stephens =

George Stephens may refer to:

- George Stephens (playwright) (1800–1851), English author and dramatist
- George Stephens (philologist) (1813–1895), British archaeologist and philologist, who worked in Scandinavia
- George Washington Stephens Sr. (1832–1904), Canadian businessman, lawyer, and politician
- George Washington Stephens Jr. (1866–1942), Canadian politician
- Frank Stephens (sculptor) (George Francis Stephens, 1859–1935), sculptor and co-founder of Arden, Delaware
- George Stephens (Canadian politician) (1846–1916), merchant and politician in Ontario, Canada
- George E. Stephens (1832–1888), American Civil War Union correspondent to the New York Weekly Anglo-African
- George Stephens (priest) (died 1751), Canon of Windsor
- George Stephens (American football) (1873–1946), college football player
- George Stephens (cricketer) (1889–1950), English cricketer
- George Stephens (badminton) (born 1957), Northern Irish badminton player

== See also ==
- George Stevens (disambiguation)
- George Stephen (disambiguation)
