= 54th Massachusetts Volunteer Regiment =

- Founded: November 20, 2008
- Country: United States
- Branch: United States Army
- Type: Ceremonial regiment

The 54th Massachusetts Volunteer Regiment is a ceremonial foot guards regiment of the Massachusetts Army National Guard. It takes its name from the 54th Massachusetts Infantry Regiment and is a public duties unit.

== History ==
The preexisting Massachusetts National Guard's Honor Guard, was re-designated as the 54th Massachusetts Volunteer Regiment. In doing so the unit assumed the history of the 54th Massachusetts Volunteer Infantry, which preceded it and which fought in the American Civil War. The 54th was made famous through its representation in the 1989 film Glory.

The unit was raised on November 21, 2008, and designated the Massachusetts National Guard ceremonial unit, forming an honor guard at military funerals and other state functions. It was invited to march in President Barack Obama's inaugural parade. In 2023, members of the unit were present when Concord, Massachusetts honored the death of Private George Washington Dugan, who died while serving with the predecessor unit.

== Company 'A': Living history ==
54th Mass Volunteer Infantry Company A is a living history and reenactment group based in Hyde Park, Massachusetts where the original regiment was formed. The company marches during key holidays, events and ceremonies. When invited, they also stage information booths, provide talks to educate the public about the 54th and participate in historical reenactments along the east coast. The group is affiliated with the official Massachusetts National Guard 54th regiment and often do events together.

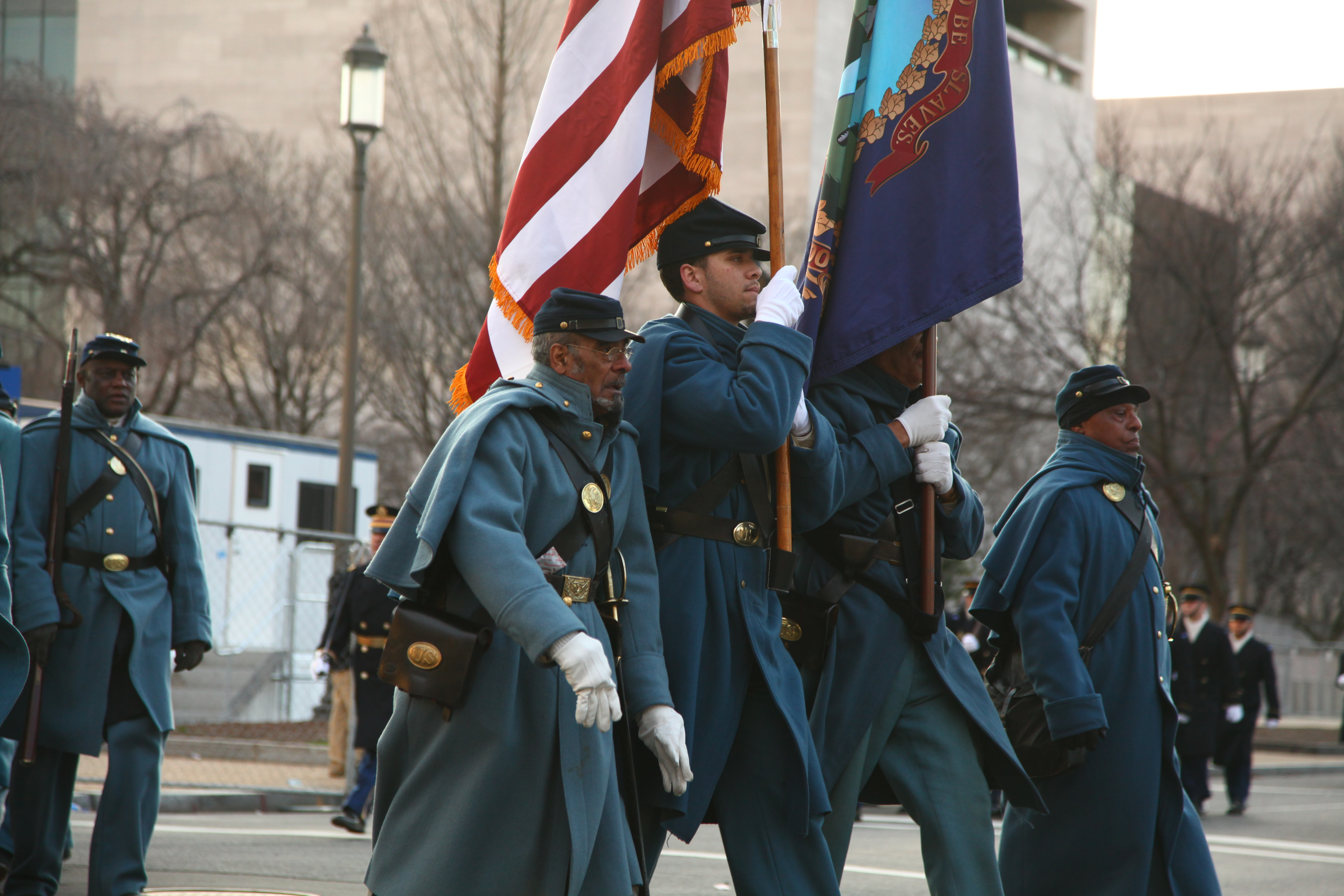
Company 'A' Marching at a presidential Inauguration
