= Milton L. Olive III =

United States Army Medal of Honor recipient

Milton Lee Olive III
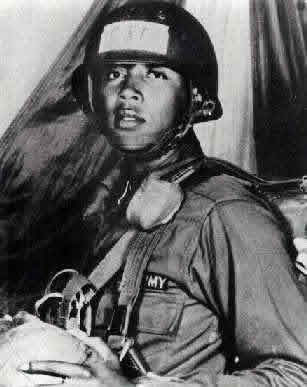
- Private First Class Milton L. Olive III
- Born: November 7, 1946; Chicago, Illinois, U.S.
- Died: October 22, 1965 (aged 18); Phu Cuong, South Vietnam
- Burial place: West Grove Missionary Baptist Church Cemetery, Lexington, Mississippi
- Military career
- Allegiance: United States of America
- Branch: United States Army
- Service years: 1964–1965
- Rank: Private First Class
- Units: Company B, 2nd Battalion, 503rd Infantry Regiment, 173rd Airborne Brigade
- Conflicts: Vietnam War †
- Awards: Medal of Honor; Purple Heart

Milton Lee Olive III (November 7, 1946 – October 22, 1965) was a United States Army soldier and a recipient of America's highest military decoration — the Medal of Honor — for his heroic action in the Vietnam War, when, at the age of 18, Olive sacrificed his life to save others by falling on a grenade. In doing so, Olive became the first African-American recipient of the Medal of Honor from the Vietnam War.

== Biography ==
Olive was born in Chicago, but moved with his family to Lexington, Mississippi at a young age, which was where he finished high school. Olive joined the Army from his birth city of Chicago, Illinois in 1964, and was serving as a Private First Class in Company B of the 2nd Battalion (Airborne), 503rd Infantry Regiment ("The Rock"), 173rd Airborne Brigade ("Sky Soldiers") in Vietnam in 1965.

On October 22, 1965, while moving through the jungle with four fellow soldiers in Phu Cuong, Olive smothered an enemy-thrown grenade with his body. Olive was killed by the explosion, but his companions avoided injury. Olive's body was returned to the United States, where he was buried in West Grove Cemetery at Lexington, Holmes County, Mississippi.

Olive was posthumously awarded the Medal of Honor. At a ceremony on the steps of the White House, on April 21, 1966, President Lyndon B. Johnson presented the award to Olive's father and stepmother. Two of the four men whose lives were saved by his actions were also in attendance.

== Tributes ==
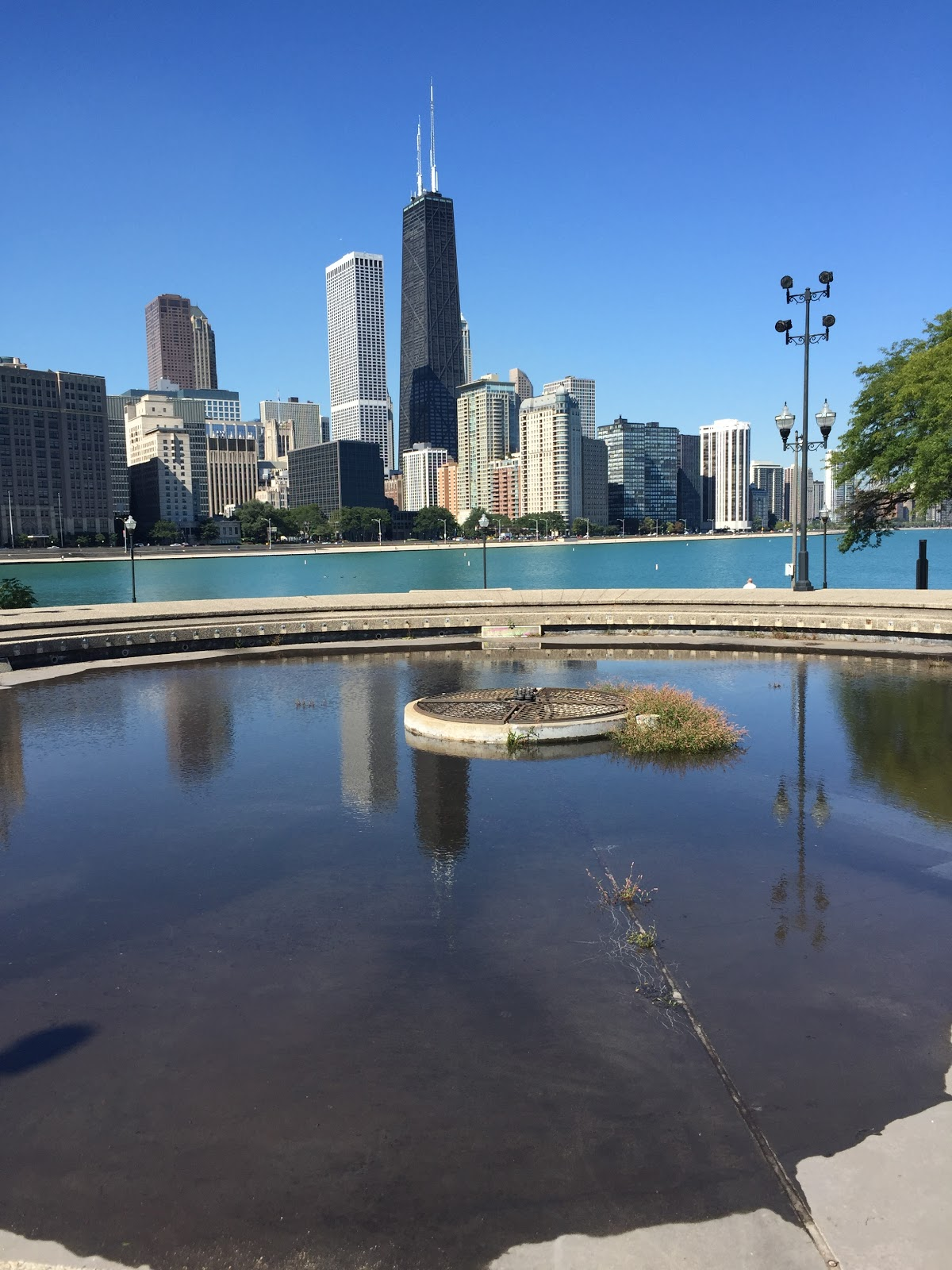
Milton Lee Olive Park in Chicago

In 1966, a plaque and park was dedicated in his honor. In 1999, the city of Chicago recognized Olive by naming Olive Park on Lake Michigan in his honor.

Olive-Harvey College, one of the City Colleges of Chicago, is named after both Olive and fellow Medal of Honor recipient Carmel Bernon Harvey Jr.

The Milton L. Olive Middle School in Wyandanch, Long Island, New York, is also named in his honor.

In 2007, a State Historical Marker was erected for Olive in Lexington, Mississippi. The dedication ceremonies included an address by the Adjutant General of the Mississippi National Guard. Fort Campbell has a recreation facility named in his honor.

In 2012, Fort Benning, GA, (changed in 2023 to Fort Moore), dedicated a Simulations facility in his honor named Olive Hall (The Maneuver Battle Lab).

Honor Field is a one-mile track located in Ft. Polk, Louisiana, which bears a plaque detailing Olive's heroics. The field is used for everything from changes of command and physical training to tests of physical fortitude in various military competitions.

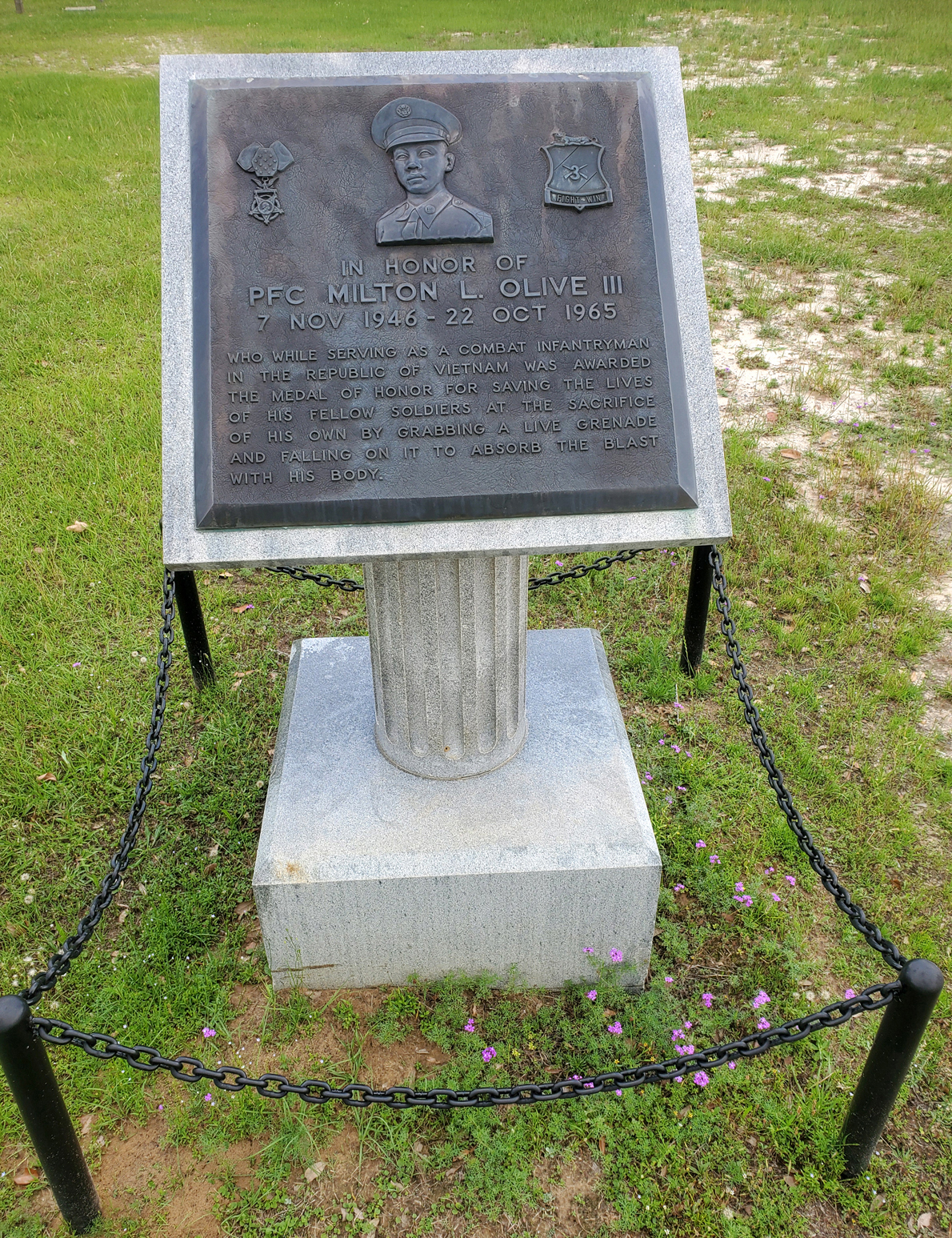
Milton L. Olive III plaque located at Honor Field in Fort Polk Louisiana detailing his heroic actions in the Vietnam war for which he was awarded a posthumous Medal of Honor.

The Downlow Saga, a 2017 novel by Los Angeles author Sheldon McCormick, is dedicated in memory of PFC Olive.

Olive's statue, along with Sgt. William Harvey Carney, is seen on the African-American Medal of Honor Recipients Memorial in Wilmington, Delaware.

In the 2020 Spike Lee film Da 5 Bloods, Olive is briefly mentioned during a conversation about portrayals of war in Hollywood, with the character Otis wishing for the portrayals of more black war heroes like Olive.

== Medal of Honor citation ==

For conspicuous gallantry and intrepidity at the risk of his life above and beyond the call of duty. Pfc. Olive was a member of the 3d Platoon of Company B, as it moved through the jungle to find the Viet Cong operating in the area. Although the platoon was subjected to a heavy volume of enemy gunfire and pinned down temporarily, it retaliated by assaulting the Viet Cong positions, causing the enemy to flee. As the platoon pursued the insurgents, Pfc. Olive and 4 other soldiers were moving through the jungle together when a grenade was thrown into their midst. Pfc. Olive saw the grenade, and then saved the lives of his fellow soldiers at the sacrifice of his own by grabbing the grenade in his hand and falling on it to absorb the blast with his body. Through his bravery, unhesitating actions, and complete disregard for his safety, he prevented additional loss of life or injury to the members of his platoon. Pfc. Olive's extraordinary heroism, at the cost of his life above and beyond the call of duty, are in the highest traditions of the U.S. Army and reflect great credit upon himself and the Armed Forces of his country.

== See also ==
- List of African-American Medal of Honor recipients
- List of Medal of Honor recipients
- List of Medal of Honor recipients for the Vietnam War
- Military history of African Americans in the Vietnam War
