= George Stephen =

George Stephen may refer to:

- George Stephen (abolitionist) (1794–1879), English-born anti-slavery advocate, lived in Australia from 1855
- George Milner Stephen (1812–1894), Australian politician, member of the South Australian Legislative Council and later, the Victorian Legislative Assembly
- George Stephen, 1st Baron Mount Stephen (1829–1921), Canadian banker and railway executive
- George A. Stephen (c.1922–1993), American inventor, entrepreneur, and the founder of Weber-Stephen Products Co.

== See also ==
- George Stephens (disambiguation)
- Martin Stephen (born 1949), headmaster of St Paul's School in London
