= African-American Medal of Honor Recipients Memorial =

- Location within Delaware Location within the United States
- 39°45′17.9″N 75°32′48.5″W
- Location: intersection of 18th Street and Baynard Boulevard on 18th Street; Brandywine/Todd Memorial Park; Wilmington, Delaware

History
- Built: 1998

Site notes
- Architect: Charles Parks

The African-American Medal of Honor Recipients Memorial is a monument dedicated to African-American recipients of the Medal of Honor since 1861. The monument, erected and dedicated in 1998 by the African American Medal of Honor Association, Inc., is located on the intersection of 18th Street and Baynard Boulevard in Brandywine Park in Wilmington, Delaware.

The sculpture on top of the monument was created by Charles Parks. It depicts Sgt. William Harvey Carney, who was the first African-American to receive the distinction, for his gallantry in saving the regimental colors (American Flag) during the Battle of Fort Wagner in 1863, and Private Milton L. Olive, who was the first black recipient of the Medal of Honor in the Vietnam War, when he sacrificed himself, age 18, by smothering a live grenade. As of 2020, there have been more than 3,500 military service members that have earned the Medal of Honor. Of those 3,500 recipients, only 92 have been African-American men. Only major acts of heroism are recognized by the Medal of Honor award.
