= Joseph Barquet =

American civil rights activist

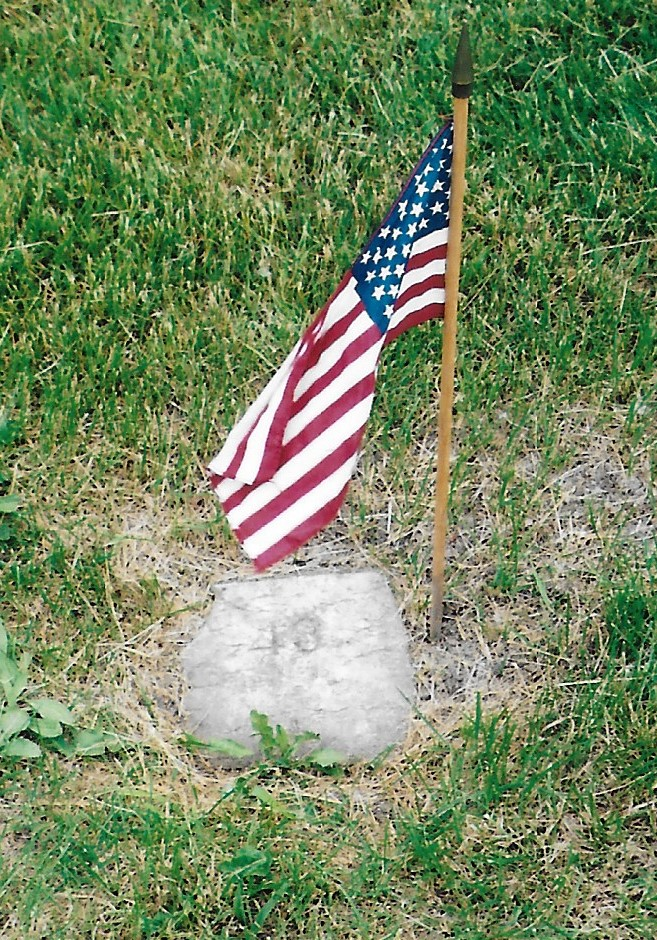
- Joseph Barquet Grave Marker
- Born: September 23, 1823
- Died: March 14, 1880 (aged 56)
- Resting place: Davenport, Iowa
- Occupation: Union Soldier
- Years active: 1863-1865
- Parent(s): Barbara Tunno Barquet and John Pierre

Joseph Humphries Barquet (September 10, 1823 - March 14, 1880) was a Union soldier in the 54th Massachusetts Infantry Regiment and a civil rights activist. Born in a wealthy family in Charleston of mixed European and African descent, he lived most of his life in Illinois as a mason. He gave many speeches and wrote newspaper articles in support of various causes which were important to the Black communities of Galesburg, Illinois as a whole, and the U.S. military.

== Early life and family ==
Barquet was the fifth born of his family of seven in Charleston, South Carolina. His father, John Pierre, was an immigrant from Saint-Domingue and gens de coleur libre. His mother was Barabara (Barbary) Tunno Barquet, born an enslaved person by her mother, Peggy, who later adopted the name Margaret Bellingall, who was enslaved but de facto free. Barbara Barquet was freed by her father, Adam Tunno, as a child, and went on to own several slaves, some of which she distributed among her children and others which she sold, dividing the profits in her will among them.

In Charleston, Barquet family made up the small population of freed Black people, about 6 percent of the total population, making the family identify with other mixed-race families referred to as "elite," also due to their literacy and ownership of property, which differed from a majority of freed Black people in Charleston who faced poverty and illiteracy. Barquet's mother, Barbrara, is believed to have owned as many as ten enslaved people at a time, keeping their profits from working for hire. Both of Barquet's parents worked as umbrella makers in their own shop. It is reported that the family's French identity allowed them to "claim a national identity," and influenced Joseph's interest in French Enlightenment beliefs and democratic beliefs from the Haitian Revolution.

Barquet, along with his siblings, attended Colored Children's School on Beaufain Street. After school, he became a brick mason.

== Life before the war ==
Shortly after his mother's death in 1846, Barquet fought in the Mexican American War. Barquet previously belonged to a band performing "patriotic tunes" which accompanied governor David Johnson while he traveled around the state reviewing militia formations. In December 1848, Barquet returned to Charleston, where he was met with family troubles as his mother's assets were supposedly taking a long time to be liquidated.

Barquet decided to move to New York where he worked at a downtown confectionery. Shortly after his arrival, Frederick Douglass' North Star was published, exposing Barquet to ideas of equal rights and abolition of slavery that weren't popular in Charleston. In late summer 1850, Barquet moved to Cincinnati, Ohio, where he worked as a bricklayer and stayed for a few months before moving to Milwaukee, in the newer state of Wisconsin. By 1850, Barquet became more vocal about antislavery and in early October of that year, warned the Black population in Milwaukee about "the dangers of legislation." While in Milwaukee, Barquet started his own painting business in 1851, but soon left to Chicago to continue his abolitionist work.

While living in Chicago, Barquet befriended Henry O. Wagoner, abolitionist and a staff member of Western Citizen. Barquet began to write letters to the newspaper, which was deemed to be "the official organ of the state's Liberty Party." Barquet's passionate letters discussed oppressing legislation like his letter from 1852, sent to Frederick Douglass, about his thoughts on the Fugitive Slave Act.

The following year in 1853, he wrote a letter to the Western Citizen about the recent fugitive slave laws which made it difficult for him to find a black wife. He sarcastically suggested marrying a white woman instead, which was then illegal in Illinois. Barquet also expressed his discontentment towards colonization and the idea of separating African Americans in a separate country rather than creating harmony within the United States itself. He concluded the letter with force:

Remember, my fellow countrymen in bonds, that wrongs do not justify a nation, nor set at nought the march of progress. The time comes, and every new rivet that is forged, but tightens the iron grasp of the giant, whose hold must relax with a sudden death. Europe smiles and taunts Americans' liberty. Her despots smile when Illinois plucks from the eagle, emblem of our country, her best plumage quill dipped in blood to sign slavery for freedmen.

Barquet moved to Galesburg, a town well known for abolitionist activities, before the war started and continued his activism as a community leader, a speaker, and an avid writer on slavery and freedom for the blacks in America. The topic of slavery emerged again in his letter to Galesburg newspapers advocating for leaving America because "exile [to Haiti] was better than slavery." Barquet, however, chose to remain in the country and fought for the freedom of black people. On August 10, 1857, the Galesburg Free Democrat mentioned Barquet's speech at a local meeting discussing the Supreme Court's Dred Scott v. Sandford decision.

In 1859, having fought in the Mexican-American War, he submitted a claim on bounty land which such veterans were entitled to. On December 3, 1859, he spoke at a gathering in the Galesburg African Methodist Church to commemorate John Brown, an abolitionist who had attempted to raid munitions from Harper's Ferry armory and incite a slave revolt and was hanged for treason on December 2. The Galesburg Free Democrat reported that Barquet was sympathetic and respectful towards Brown for his heroism, but disagreed with using violence to promote his impulses.

Barquet gave a speech in Washington, D.C., in 1862, as reported by the Chicago Tribune on April 22, to a mass meeting of black citizens addressing the act of Congress to abolish slavery in the state. He then made an appearance with other African Americans in Chicago celebrating the date the Emancipation Proclamation came into effect on January 1, 1863. This was four months before he walked in uniform under the 54th regiment - the Union's most well-known black regiment.

== The Civil War ==
On April 26, 1863, Joseph Barquet enlisted into the military as a volunteer for the infantry of the 54th regiment based in Readville, Massachusetts. Barquet and twelve other black men living in Illinois signed up to service for a different state because a black regiment in Illinois was not an option at the time.

Barquet made multiple correspondences throughout the duration of his service, one of which was a letter to Mr. Prescott recounting the Battle of Olustee after Barquet's promotion to sergeant on July 19, 1863. He was promoted the day after the 54th regiment's famous battle at Fort Wagner, the casualties of which were listed in Barquet's letter published by the Chicago Tribune on August 22, 1863. The Galesburg Free Democrat published Barquet's letter to Mr. Prescott on March 17, 1864, in which he also mentioned being paid less than promised, that the "black cusses" of company H only received $10 monthly instead of $13. In fact, during the 58-day siege of Fort Wagner, the black men from the 54th were digging trenches along with other soldiers without pay because they would not accept the $10 per month.

One year after the Emancipation Proclamation went into effect and a few months after the Confederates left Wagner, the men of the 54th regiment celebrated the ruling's first anniversary. Barquet was chosen as the orator of the day, as reported by Luis Emilio in his book "A Brave Black Regiment". A few weeks after the event, Barquet was mentioned in the regimental history for the oven he constructed that provided two hundred loaves of bread to the troops.

The 54th were stationed on Block Island of the Charleston area in April, 1864, where Barquet wrote a letter to the Anglo African newspaper. This letter led to a court martial charging him with "conduct prejudiced to good order and military discipline", that he "calculated to create in the minds of each reader a false impression in regard to the quantity and quality of rations provided to the troops." It was the following portion of the letter that got Barquet into trouble:

In a cracker four inches square you can find a world. Out from a little circular hole comes weevils, red ants, and little tiny butterflies. Here are fresh eggs. Breakfast in this corner. Spider eggs. They are good - all eggs are good. Wash them down with brackish black coffee; no sweetening; the coffee the remnants of three meals. This makes the bones prominent, Thus you may weigh me and find me wanting in weight, like unto our last meat and sugar. How can a man be sweet tempered without sugar for his tea and coffee, with the thermometer trying to go up as high as Mott's signal Corps' rockers?

Barquet pleaded guilty to writing the letter but not to the foul intentions which they had accused him of. The court was reportedly "lenient, believing the accused to have acted more from thoughtlessness than from any intention of wrong" and ordered for the colonel of the 54th regiment to reprimand Barquet.

Apart from writing correspondence about the war, Barquet also expressed his thoughts on policies that would affect the livelihood of the black community. Another of Barquet's letters was sent to the National Convention of Colored Men at a convention held in Syracuse, New York in October 1864. In this letter, Barquet urged delegates from Morris Island, South Carolina to encourage education among the black community as well as the importance of their participation in the government and ability to own land.

== Life After the War ==
Barquet returned home to Galesburg after the war to his family and job, where his political activism continued.

=== Convention of 1866 ===
The Convention of 1866 was a gathering of Black Americans after the Civil War and took place October 16 through October 18. Barquet was elected as a temporary chairman of this convention, due to his known leadership and activism. The convention was held to discuss the issues and lack of equal rights for Black Americans, which many believed they were to receive after the end of slavery and the end of the Civil War. In the Proceedings of the convention, the goal of this convention is as follows:

It has been deemed advisable to issue a call for a Convention of the colored men of this State, for the purpose of expressing their views in relation to the present condition of public affairs, and of agreeing upon a course of policy which may enhance the best interests of our people in general, and one which we can unitedly pursue, in order to obtain those God-given rights to which we are entitled, as citizens and men.

Throughout the course of the convention they talked about many different issues, such as education, taxation, property rights, labor rights, the right to a fair trial, and voting rights. They called out inconsistencies within what the U.S. Constitution promised all men, and the rights that they were denied everyday. Delegates and speakers at the convention urged community based action, established schools and educational programs, and gathered funds. They encouraged people to remain together throughout this time and to remain organized within the group structure throughout this fight for civil rights.

=== Activism Against Segregated Schools ===
Before the Civil War, black children in Galesburg often attended the same public schools as white children. As the black population in Galesburg grew, so did their need for education. In July 1863, a group approached the school board about this issue, and they decided that the black community must provide its own space and resources, but that the board would furnish a teacher. A place in the old post-office was found and the segregation of schools in Galesburg began, continuing for many years, and by the end of the Civil War it became a fact of life.

Barquet was a leader in the town and spoke out against this often, giving speeches and rallying people behind him. On September 11, 1870, the black population of Galesbug presented a petition to the school board asking to allow all people to send their children to the nearest public school, regardless of race. The board of the public schools in Galesburg continuously tried to table this matter, but Barquet would not allow that to happen. On Monday, January 22, 1871, a gathering of the black community took place where Barquet spoke out about taking further action. Superintendent Roberts, who is said to have been a progressive and innovative administrator, and two members of the school board were present at this event. In October 1871, Barquet informed the Republican that they had raised $200 with the intention of using it to hire lawyers to test the question in court of whether black children should be allowed in public schools. Clark E. Carr, Editor and Publisher of the Republic, who previously in an editorial said that black people should have the same rights as other citizens but should "not insist of their rights "for the present,'" wrote in response to Barquets intention of hiring a lawyer that a referendum should take place "'next November,'" instead. Discussions took place at the school board meeting two weeks later, by lawyers Henry Clarke and Edwin Hatch Leach. In the end the board failed to come to any decisions, instead saying they were to postpone the vote until legislature or law from the state was enacted. In October 1872, the school board finally voted that black children "ought to receive equally with the white children the benefits of common school education." Action to desegregate the schools did not begin for another three years after this decision.

=== Activism and Speeches ===
Throughout his life in Galesburg Barquet was known as a spokesman for the black community. He performed regularly at the annual Emancipation Day festivities that took place every August, he was the speaker in 1870 during a celebration of the passage of the Fifteenth amendment in Galesburg and again in 1874 at the Fifteenth Amendment day in Jacksonville, IL, and was the orator at the Emancipation Day celebration in Chicago in August 1876. He also wrote the local newspapers regularly providing commentary on current events.

=== Later life and death ===
In 1871, the annual memorial day parade took place in Galesburg, but unlike in the past, this year the Democrats of Galesburg tried to bar Black soldiers from marching in this parade. The organizing committee finally agreed to allow the Black veterans to march in the parade, but by this time both Black and White veterans alike refused to participate. The next year Barquet was banned from participating and the other Black veterans withdrew from the event as well.

This event, among many other political disappointments and the hardships of his life contributed to Barquet's move to Chicago as he felt he was "'not properly appreciated in Galesburg.'" Due to the great fire of 1871, when Barquet moved to Chicago in 1872 there was a great need for masons to restore the 18,000 buildings that had been destroyed. But, only two months later Barquet and his family were forced to return to Galesburg as Chicago trade union discrimination kept him from making a livable wage. Back in Galesburg, Barquet had a difficult time and had to supplement his work as a mason with a white-washing business. He was continuously discussed in a patronizing way by newspapers in which he was called "Captain Barquet". Discrimination against Black Veterans as a whole was extremely prevalent in the local newspapers as well as in the events that these veterans were barred from participating in. In October 1874 Barquet was arrested for drunkenness, and later re-arrested for cursing the officer who had taken him to jail. The last time that a newspaper references Barquet was in 1876, writing that he made a good speech "pleading the right of his race to celebrate."

On March 14 of 1880, Barquet died in his home, possibly due to "chronic whiskey." On March 15, The Davenport Gazette published an obituary for Barquet stating that he died at 58 years old in his house after being ill for a week. The obituary noted that "he was a man of fine abilities, and quite a prominent personage among his people" and encouraged citizens to "lend a helping hand at the funeral, as his family are in reduced circumstances." He was buried under a stone that has the number "43" in a cemetery in Davenport, IL.
