= Luis F. Emilio =

Union Army officer (1884–1918)

Luis Fenellosa Emilio
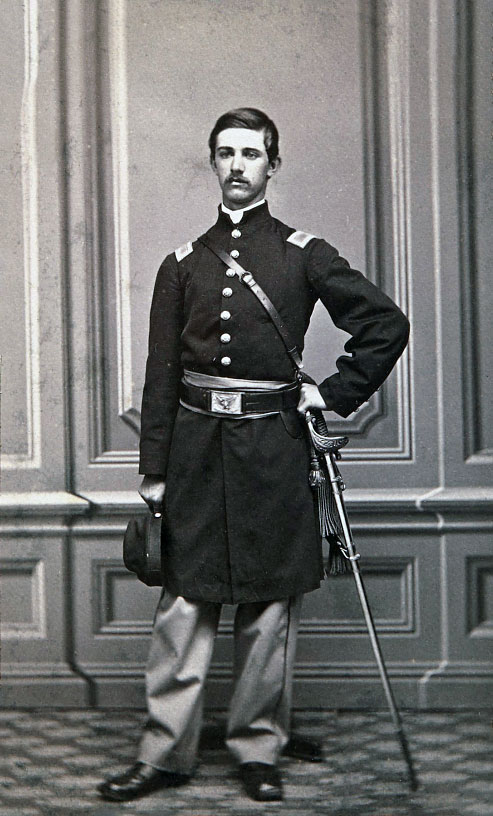
- Captain Luis F. Emilio
- Born: December 22, 1844; Salem, Massachusetts
- Died: 16 September 1918 (aged 73); New York, New York
- Military career
- Allegiance: United States
- Service years: 1861-1866
- Rank: Captain (U.S.)
- Units: 23rd Massachusetts Infantry Regiment; 54th Massachusetts Volunteer Infantry
- Commands: Company E, 54th Massachusetts
- Conflicts: American Civil War: Battle of Roanoke Island; Battle of New Bern; Battle of Goldsborough Bridge; Battle of Kinston; Battle of White Hall; Battle of Grimball's Landing; Second Battle of Fort Wagner; Battle of Olustee; Battle of Honey Hill; Battle of Boykin's Mill
- Other work: Author of "Brave Black Regiment"

Luis Fenellosa Emilio (December 22, 1844 - September 16, 1918) was a Captain in the 54th Massachusetts Volunteer Infantry, an American Civil War Union regiment.

== Biography ==
Emilio was born on December 22, 1844, in Salem, Massachusetts, the son of a Spanish immigrant who made his living as a music instructor. Although the minimum age for service in the Union army was 18, in 1861 — at age 16 — Emilio gave his age as 18 and enlisted in Company F of the 23rd Massachusetts Volunteer Infantry. He was noticeably brave and steadfast, and by September, 1862 he had been promoted to the rank of Sergeant.

Emilio was among the group of original officers of the 54th selected by Massachusetts War Governor John Albion Andrew. He mustered in as a 2nd Lieutenant on March 30, 1863. Two weeks later, he was promoted to 1st Lieutenant, and on May 27, he was made Captain of Company E. Captain Emilio emerged from the ferocious assault on Fort Wagner on July 18, 1863, as the regiment's acting commander, since all of the other ranking officers had been killed or wounded.

In his report regarding the assault on Fort Wagner, Brig. General T. Seymour, commander of the United States forces wrote from Morris Island, South Carolina on November 7, 1863:

"Upon leaving the ditch for the parapet, they obstinately contested with the bayonet our advance. Notwithstanding these difficulties, the men succeeded in driving the enemy from most of their guns, many following the enemy into the fort. It was here upon the crest of the parapet that Colonel Shaw fell; here fell Captains Russell and Simpkins; here were also most of the officers wounded. The colors of the regiment reached the crest, and were fought for by the enemy; the State flag there torn form its staff, but the staff remains with us. Hand grenades were now added to the missiles directed against the men. The fight raged here for about an hour, when compelled to abandon the fort, the men formed a line about seven hundred yards from the fort, under the command of Capt. Luis F. Emilio, — the ninth captain in the line; other captains were either killed or wounded. The regiment then held the front until relieved by the Tenth Connecticut at about two o'clock A.M. of the 19th".

Captain Emilio fought with the 54th for over three years of dangerous combat, including the Battle of Olustee in Florida, mustering out of the Union army on March 29, 1865, still not yet 21 years old.

Following the war, he went into the real estate business, first in San Francisco, and later in New York. Emilio married Mary Elizabeth Belden, daughter of Californian politician and businessman Josiah Belden, in 1876. After assisting two old comrades documenting the history of the 23rd Massachusetts regiment in the mid-1880s, he began work on his own documentation of the 54th, publishing the first edition of Brave Black Regiment in 1891, and the revised edition in 1894. He died in New York on September 16, 1918, after a long illness, and was buried in the Harmony Grove Cemetery in Salem, Massachusetts.

== See also ==
- 54th Massachusetts Volunteer Infantry
- Hispanics in the American Civil War
- First Sergeant Robert John Simmons
