= Olive–Harvey College =

Community college in Chicago, Illinois, U.S.

- Motto: Education that Works
- Type: Community college
- Established: 1970; 56 years ago
- Affiliations: City Colleges of Chicago
- Chancellor: Juan Salgado
- President: Kimberly Hollingsworth (interim)
- Location: Chicago, Illinois, U.S.
- Campus: Urban
- Nickname: Purple Panthers
- Website: ccc.edu/olive-harvey

Olive–Harvey College is a public municipal community college in the Pullman community area in the far south side of Chicago, Illinois, United States. It is part of the City Colleges of Chicago system.

== History ==
Olive–Harvey College began serving residents of the South Side in the late 1950s with the opening of the Fenger and Southeast campuses of the City Colleges of Chicago. These two campuses were then consolidated and renamed Olive–Harvey College in 1970. The 67 acres (27 ha) college is the largest campus of any of the City Colleges.

The school's name is derived from two Chicagoan Medal of Honor recipients who lost their lives in the Vietnam War: Milton Olive, III, paratrooper, and Carmel B. Harvey, infantryman. Both were posthumously awarded the Medal of Honor.

Besides its main building in the Pullman Community Area, Olive-Harvey also includes the South Chicago Learning Center located at 3055 E. 92nd Street, a facility that provides vocational training, technical training and adult education courses to adults in the Chicago region.

== Programs ==
Accredited by the Higher Learning Commission, Olive-Harvey offers many Associate's degree, certificate and short-term training programs to prepare students to transfer to bachelor's degree programs or to move directly into the workforce.

In 2012, it was announced that Olive-Harvey will focus on transportation, distribution, and logistics (TDL) as part of City Colleges of Chicago's College to Careers program. Part of this refocus includes the building of a new, $42.2 million TDL building. The new facility will train students for what is projected to be more than 100,000 job openings over the next 10 years. The new facility will train students for what is projected to be more than 100,000 job openings over the next 10 years. The new TDL facility is part of a five-year, $524 million capital plan for all seven City Colleges of Chicago. The center at Olive-Harvey will be funded by $31.6 million from the state and $13.2 million from City Colleges.

== Location ==
Olive–Harvey College is located in Chicago's Pullman neighborhood just off the Bishop Ford Freeway at 10001 S. Woodlawn Avenue. The Chicago Transit Authority serves the campus via the 28 Stony Island and 106 East 103rd buses.

- Main campus: 41.710°N 87.589°W
- South Chicago campus: 41.7280°N 87.5489°W
