= Carmel Bernon Harvey Jr. =

United States Army soldier

- Army Medal of Honor
- Born: October 6, 1946; Montgomery, West Virginia, US
- Died: June 21, 1967 (aged 20); Binh Dinh Province, Republic of Vietnam
- Burial place: Cedar Park Cemetery, Calumet Park, Illinois
- Military career
- Allegiance: United States of America
- Branch: United States Army
- Service years: 1965–1967
- Rank: Specialist Four
- Units: 5th Cavalry Regiment, 1st Cavalry Division (Airmobile)
- Conflicts: Vietnam War †
- Awards: Medal of Honor; Purple Heart

Carmel Bernon Harvey Jr. (October 6, 1946 – June 21, 1967) was a United States Army soldier and a recipient of the United States military's highest decoration—the Medal of Honor—for his actions in the Vietnam War.

== Biography ==
Harvey joined the Army from his hometown in the Hegewisch community area of Chicago, Illinois in 1965, and by June 21, 1967, was serving as a specialist four in Company B, 1st Battalion, 5th Cavalry Regiment, 1st Cavalry Division (Airmobile). During a firefight on that day, in Binh Dinh Province, Republic of Vietnam, an enemy bullet hit and activated a hand grenade attached to Harvey's belt. Unable to remove the live device from his belt, he ran towards an enemy machinegun emplacement until the grenade exploded, killing him and momentarily halting the enemy's fire.

Harvey, aged 20 at his death, was buried in Cedar Park Cemetery, Calumet Park, Illinois. Olive-Harvey College, one of the City Colleges of Chicago is named after him and fellow Medal of Honor recipient Milton L. Olive, III. A fitness center on Fort Hood is also named after Harvey. The auditorium of George Washington High School in Chicago, which serves his home community of Hegewisch, is named Harvey Hall in his honor.

== Medal of Honor citation ==

For conspicuous gallantry and intrepidity in action at the risk of his life above and beyond the call of duty. Sp4 Harvey distinguished himself as a fire team leader with Company B, during combat operations. Ordered to secure a downed helicopter, his platoon established a defensive perimeter around the aircraft, but shortly thereafter a large enemy force attacked the position from 3 sides. Sp4 Harvey and 2 members of his squad were in a position directly in the path of the enemy onslaught, and their location received the brunt of the fire from an enemy machine gun. In short order, both of his companions were wounded, but Sp4 Harvey covered this loss by increasing his deliberate rifle fire at the foe. The enemy machine gun seemed to concentrate on him and the bullets struck the ground all around his position. One round hit and armed a grenade attached to his belt. Quickly, he tried to remove the grenade but was unsuccessful. Realizing the danger to his comrades if he remained and despite the hail of enemy fire, he jumped to his feet, shouted a challenge at the enemy, and raced toward the deadly machine gun. He nearly reached the enemy position when the grenade on his belt exploded, mortally wounding Sp4 Harvey, and stunning the enemy machine gun crew. His final act caused a pause in the enemy fire, and the wounded men were moved from the danger area. Sp4 Harvey's dedication to duty, high sense of responsibility, and heroic actions inspired the others in his platoon to decisively beat back the enemy attack. His acts are in keeping with the highest traditions of the military service and reflect great credit upon himself and the U.S. Army.

== See also ==
- List of Medal of Honor recipients
- List of Medal of Honor recipients for the Vietnam War
