= Boys the Old Flag Never Touched the Ground =

American patriotic song

"Boys the Old Flag Never Touched The Ground"
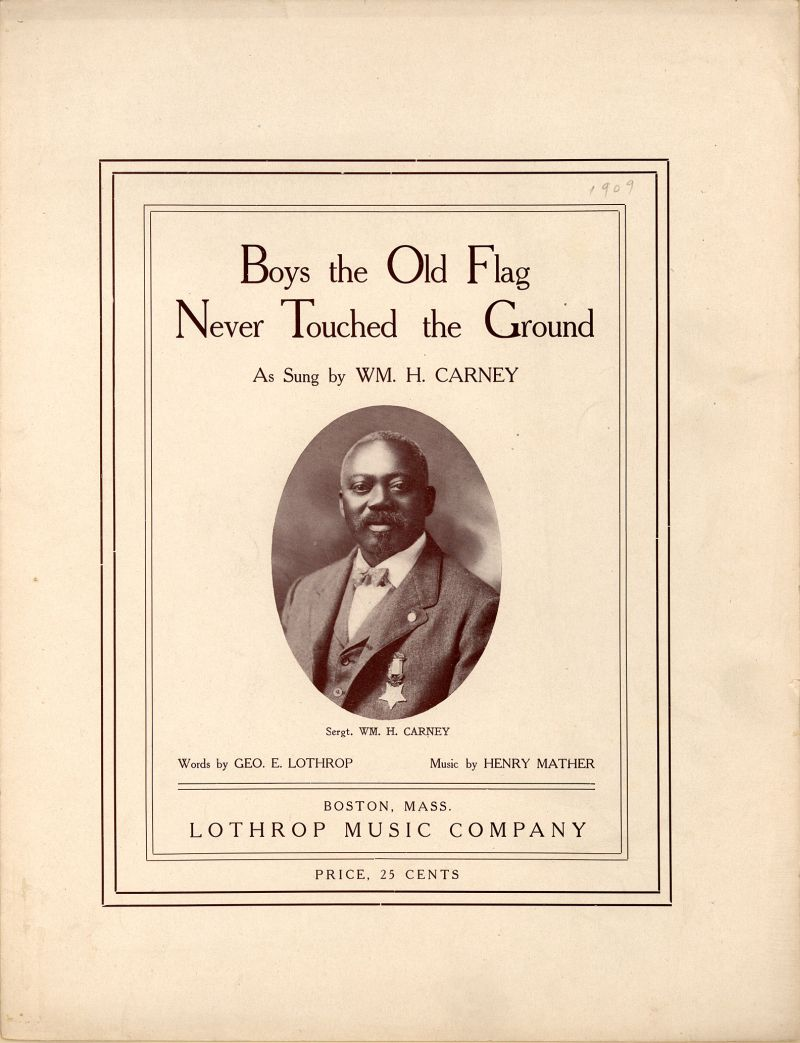
- Cover, sheet music, 1909, with photo of W.H. Carney

Song
- Language: English
- Published: 1918
- Songwriter(s): Bob Cole, James Weldon Johnson and J. Rosamond Johnson
- Composer(s): Henry Mather
- Lyricist(s): George E. Lothrop

"Boys the Old Flag Never Touched The Ground" is a patriotic song that was sung at events about the Medal of Honor recipient Sgt. William H. Carney of the 54th Massachusetts Volunteer Infantry. The song was written by Bob Cole, James Weldon Johnson, and J. Rosamond Johnson and was sung in their Broadway musical "Shoo Fly Regiment." It was published in 1901 (Carney got his Medal of Honour only decades after the war in 1900). They dedicated the song to Carney.

It celebrates his actions during the Battle of Fort Wagner during the American Civil War. After Carney's death in 1908, Henry Mather and George E. Lothrop put his song to music and published it. The chorus celebrates Carney's actions:

'Twas the Blue against the Gray, Boys,
And he said to all around,
"I've only done my duty boys,
The old Flag never touch'd the ground.

The full text of the song clearly shows the ethnicity of the hero whose virtues it extols:

One night on Southern battlefields,

down where Fort Wagner lay,

A regiment of black men fought,

The Blue against the Gray.

As the sun sank slowly in the West

A thunderstorm and gale

Wept tears to see the brave black troops

Shot down by leaden hail.

A negro saw the old flag fall

And threw his gun away

To grasp the falling colors staff

And lead them to the fray.

Twas the Blue against the Gray, Boys,

And he said to all around

"I've only done my duty boys,

The old Flag never touch'd the ground."

"I've only done my duty, boys"

He said to all around,

"I've only done my duty boys,

The old Flag never touch'd the ground."

Around the dead and dying lay;

He reach'd the parapet,

The old flag never touched the ground,

As kneeling he held it yet.

The old flag did not bite the dust,

Where the bold black hero lay;

Two armies battled for the fort,

The Blue against the Gray

Amid the awful slaughter there,

he said to all around,

"I've only done my duty, boys,

It did not touch the ground."

The account of Sgt. Carney's action as it appears on his Medal of Honor citation May 23, 1900:

When the color sergeant was shot down, this soldier grasped the flag, led the way to the parapet, and planted the colors thereon. When the troops fell back he brought off the flag, under a fierce fire in which he was twice severely wounded.

The account of Sgt. Carney's action as it appeared in 'The United States Service Magazine, 1864:

As our forces retire, Sergeant Carney, who has kept the colors of his regiment flying upon the parapet of Wagner during the entire conflict, is seen creeping along on one knee, still holding up the flag, and only yielding its sacred trust upon finding an officer of his regiment. As he enter the field-hospital, where his wounded comrades are being brought in, they cheer him and the colors. Though nearly exhausted with the loss of blood, he says, "Boys, the old flag never touched the ground."

== Bibliography ==
- Seniors, Paula Marie, "Beyond Lift Every Voice and Sing: The Culture of Uplift, Identity and Politics in Black Musical Theater," Ohio State University Press, 2003
- Davis, Robert Stewart. "Three Months Around Charleston Bar; Or, the Great Siege as We Saw It". The United States Service Magazine. New York: Charles B. Richardson (1864) I:3 March 1864.
