= Thomas Leslie Outerbridge =

Thomas Leslie Outerbridge (died 5 September 1927) was a notable Bermudian, who participated in the American Civil War as a sailor aboard blockade runner ships from Bermuda.

== Involvement in the American Civil War ==
During the War, the Union imposed a blockade on the Confederacy, which was then an important trade partner with European countries, particularly England. Harbours such as Bermuda's St. George harbour and Nassau in the Bahamas became important bases for blockade running missions. Such missions became exceedingly dangerous; blockade runners were paid far greater sums than ordinary sailors. Outerbridge and his brother both took this opportunity.

On one occasion, Outerbridge was serving aboard the steamboat Robert E. Lee. Departing from Wilmington at about 9 p.m. (at high tide, which is when the large ship could get over Wilmington's sandbar), the Robert E. Lee joined a small fleet of blockade runners which was soon attacked by two Man-of-War ships, flanking the fleet on either side. The Men-of-War immediately attacked with heavy cannons, destroying a winch and severely wounding a number of foreign sailors. One of them approached the Robert E. Lee close enough for small arms fire, though there were no casualties.

While the captain, Wilkinson, studiously ignored the attack, Outerbridge, the mate and a number of crewmen had gone to the forecastle to watch for other craft. A round shot hit close to Outerbridge, causing him to fall unconscious while the other crewmen fled. The following day, Outerbridge was commended by the ship's officers for his bravery, and the crew picked small bullets from the woodwork.

At the time, the Robert E. Lee was en route to Halifax with a number of Confederate officers on board. The Confederates were bound for England to collect two Men-of-War for the Confederate government (the Viper and the Vixen). The British government seized the officers and sent them to Bermuda. The Robert E. Lee also set course for the island.

Not all of Outerbridge's adventures in the Civil War would be as pleasant, as he would be twice captured by the North. On one of these occasions, he was serving on the steamer Sirene. Originally owned by the British government and used as the Dockyard duty boat, the ship was mothballed and sold to Mr. Fininsey, the popular Confederate Consul in Bermuda. Fininsey deployed the Sirene to Wilmington with a crew to bring back another steamship, the Cape of Good Hope, to act as a cotton freighter. At the time, the Cape of Good Hope was a passenger boat between Wilmington and Smithfield, a role that the Sirene would then fulfill. Captain Jeremiah Peniston was selected as the ship's Master, with Outerbridge's brother Eldon Outerbridge as first officer and Outerbridge himself as second officer. A Virginian man by the name of Mr. Tab was the ship's purser.

A week out of Bermuda, the rather slow Sirene reached the American coastline off Bowford, North Carolina. They headed southward towards Cape Fear under sail, hoping that it would deceive the blockade fleet. Only an hour later, the Man-of-War Key Stone State (which was later purchased by a Mr. Webb of New York, renamed the San Francisco and used as a mail ship to Bermuda) intercepted the Sirene and towed it into Bowford, with the crew laughing at the blockade runners' pitiful craft.

The following day, the crew were transferred onto a receiving ship in Bowford's harbour, where they found a welcoming presence in the ship's captain. Having visited Bermuda several times in a whaler, the ship's captain was kind towards his prisoners. However, they spent the next ten days treated like fighting cocks. Four days into this, the Sirene crew witnessed another blockade running steamer, the Pavince, being chased on shore by the Man-of-War. The steamer was fast enough that the crew had the leeway to abandon the ship and row ashore on small craft, but they were immediately captured by Union soldiers. The Pavince was at that time on fire, and exploded. With the crew of the Pavince – also familiar with the Captain from his time in Bermuda – aboard, the blockade runners "had a good time as long as [they] were there".

After the ten days, the blockade runners disembarked into Camp Hamilton, which was under military authority. Treatment was severe. Four days into the stay, the Union wardens sent all imprisoned masons – including the both blockade runner captains and some fifteen thousand Confederate soldiers.

At Point Look Out, the blockade runners were stripped, with their possessions to be returned at the end of their imprisonment. Described conservatively as "a real pest hole", Point Look Out was a mile (1.6 km) square, surrounded by 15-foot-tall (4.6 m) lumber walls. Around this wall, stationed every 30 feet (9.1 m) on a platform 4 feet (1.2 m) from the top, Union soldiers kept watch. Many of these were former slaves liberated by the North, who exacted their revenge by shooting Southern soldiers, killing upwards of 15–20 per day.

Prison was difficult for Outerbridge. Like the other prisoners, he had to sleep in the open air, and ate a loaf of bread a day (with a quarter pound [0.11 kg] of fresh beef delivered thrice a week). The wagons that delivered the daily bread "carried out something else". Eldon had kept on him a gold sovereign by hiding it under his tongue. Eldon and Thomas used this money to trade with settlers immediately outside the camp, through a small hole in the wall. Initially, the brothers tried to send letters to Lord Lyon, the British Ambassador to Washington, requesting aid. These letters would never be received, however.

Mr. Tab – the Sirene's Purser – would prove invaluable at this point. With the help of the local Chaplain, he managed to get a letter through, and soon the brothers were free.

Unfortunately, the money and possessions that had been removed from the brothers was nowhere to be found. With a gift enough to get them to New York, the brothers secured a loan from a Mr. Middleton, the Bermuda Agent, to pay for their trip back home (a loan that was promptly repaid). They returned to Bermuda as crewmen aboard the barque Lapflerene, where they were well treated by the captain – William Peniston – and his wife for the eight-day journey.

Upon returning to Bermuda, the crew made for Castle Harbour, proceeding up the old Quarry as close to the Outerbridge's homes at Bailey's Bay as they could get.

Near the close of the war, the Outerbridge brothers entered the employ on one John Tory Bourne. Bourne named them captain (Eldon) and chief officer (Thomas) of the ship Sarah Ann. The ill-fated brig would be blown ashore and wrecked in a hurricane on the main island of St. Thomas

== Post-war activities ==
The American Civil War would not be Outerbridge's only source of adventure. As the master of Mr. Nicholas McCallan's schooner Bravo, Outerbridge travelled to Prince Edward's Island to take on a cargo of Christmas stores (including yellow turnips, Irish potatoes, cabbages and oats), including a deck load of poultry and 8 to 10 horses. The morning that the Bravo was to set sail for Bermuda, however, the crew awoke to find the entire harbour frozen solid. Outerbridge ordered that the horses be taken ashore and be stabled for the winter, and after completing that order, the crew did not return. Alone save for his faithful steward Mr. John Virgin, Outerbridge waited out the winter. When the ice broke, he took the horses back on board, and the two men sailed for St. George. Though the turkeys and geese were rather lean, they would fetch a fair price of half a crown apiece – the usual price for fat birds.

Thomas Outerbridge would also sail the Harvest Queen, the McMillian and the T.H.A. Pitt, as was the long-time Master of Mr. J.S. Darrell's tug Clover. It is believed that the last sailing ship her had charge of was the brigantine Peeress, belonging to one Mr. H.C. Outerbridge. Thomas took the Peeress north for general cargo and a deckload of livestock. On his return, the ship's well-kept glass readings showed an approaching hurricane. Outerbridge went north and then west of Bermuda to avoid the damaging storm. They finally arrived in Hamilton without any damage – attributed to Outerbridge's skill as a mariner.

== Personal life ==
Outerbridge was reputed to be a keen sportsman, riding and attending the horse races at Shelley Bay. Never far from the water, boat racing was his strongest sport. He introduced the dinghy Teal – built by Michael Davis and the winner of three races under Outerbridge's handling.

He would marry Alice Hollis, and have five sons by her. Unfortunately, two of them – Gordon and William – would predecease them. Surviving him were Ernest Seon Outerbridge; Thomas Reginald Outerbridge; and George Harrison Outerbridge.

== Death ==
Outerbridge did not slow down with his years, having been known to continue travelling into St. George's until mere months before his death. He died in the afternoon of Sunday, 5 September 1927, at the house of his son George, in Bailey's Bay.

His funeral at the Holy Trinity Church was described as "very largely attended" – many attending from a distance – with numerous, beautiful floral arrangements. In attendance were his faithful follower John Virgin, his nephews F.C. Outerbridge, Bernard Wilkinson, Wickwire Davis, Stephen Wilkinson, Malcolm Hollis and Sturgis Davis (who acted as the carriers), and was performed by the Rev. Canon Earp, Rector of Hamilton and Smith's, and the Rev. A. T. Tucker, Rector of St. George's.

== See also ==
- Blockade runners of the American Civil War

== Sources ==
- Royal Gazette and Colonist Daily, Friday edition of 9 September 1927; article written by Dr. G. S. Rankin
- "Experiences of Captain Thomas Leslie Outerbridge during the Blockade 1863–1864"
