= George E. Stephens =

George E. Stephens (c. 1832 – April 24, 1888) was a 1st Sergeant and 1st and 2nd Lieutenant in the 54th Massachusetts Volunteer Infantry, an American Civil War Union regiment, and a war correspondent to the New York Weekly Anglo-African.

== Early life ==
Stephens was born in about 1832 in Philadelphia, where his family had moved from Virginia the previous year to escape the white violence which arose following Nat Turner’s rebellion. His father, William Stephens, worked as a bootblack, waiter, and laborer, and became a lay preacher in the First African Baptist Church, a strongly abolitionist congregation active in the Underground Railroad.[His school Records are not recorded]

== Education ==
George Stephens was well educated, likely in schools operated by the Quakers and the Pennsylvania Abolition Society.

== Career ==
He worked as a cabinet maker, with stints also as an upholsterer and as a sailor.

After the Civil War, he initially worked in conjunction with the Freedmen's Bureau educating newly freed slaves in Virginia. For a time he worked in Philadelphia, and later moved to Brooklyn, New York, where he died in 1888.

== Community activism ==
Together with 15 other associates, in 1853 he founded a literary society and library named the Banneker Institute in honor of the African-American mathematician Benjamin Banneker. He also became active in the Underground Railroad. During his time at sea during 1857–1858, Stephens was nearly enslaved in Charleston, South Carolina, building his hatred of slavery even higher than his earlier strong abolitionist views.

== Military service ==
Like a great many northern African-Americans, once the civil war broke out Stephens was outraged and frustrated by the Federal government's initial unwillingness to allow them to fight against the South. Stephens signed on as the cook and personal servant of Benjamin C. Tilghman, an officer in the Army of the Potomac's 26th Regiment. He began sending his war correspondence to the New York Weekly Anglo-African during his service with the 26th. After the 54th Massachusetts Volunteer Infantry — the first regiment enlisting free Northern blacks — began forming during March 1863, Stephens argued strongly for black support of the regiment, and recruited enlistees for several months, He himself reported for duty as a 1st Sergeant on April 30, 1863. He was in the heart of the assault on Fort Wagner in Charleston Harbor on July 18, 1863, being wounded and barely escaping capture. He fought through the war with the 54th Massachusetts, receiving field commissions as a 2nd Lieutenant and then as a 1st Lieutenant, mustering out of the army in August 1865.

== See also ==
- 54th Massachusetts Volunteer Infantry
