= George Barker Stevens =

American clergyman (1854–1906)

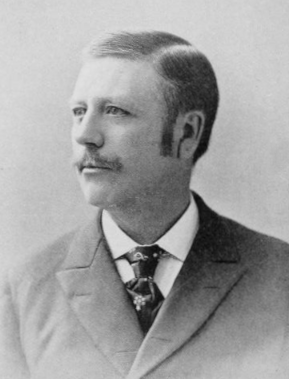
- Born: July 13, 1854; Spencer, New York, US
- Died: June 22, 1906 (aged 51); New Haven, Connecticut, US
- Education: University of Rochester; Yale Divinity School; Syracuse University; Illinois College; University of Jena
- Occupations: Clergyman, writer, professor
- Spouse: Kate Abell Mattison (m. 1880)
- Children: 2

George Barker Stevens (July 13, 1854 - June 22, 1906) was an American Congregational and Presbyterian clergyman, theologian, author, educator, and Yale Divinity School professor.

== Early life ==
Stevens was born July 13, 1854, in Spencer, New York, the son of Thomas Jackson Stevens and Weltha Barker Stevens. His father was a farmer of Dutch descent.

== Education and ministry ==
He graduated from the University of Rochester in 1877, and attended the Baptist Rochester Theological Seminary for a year before transferring to Yale Divinity School, where he graduated in 1880. At Yale, he was a member of the Phi Beta Kappa and Delta Kappa Epsilon fraternities.

In July 1880, immediately after his graduation, he was called as pastor of the First Congregational Church in Buffalo, New York, and two years later, began serving as minister of the First Presbyterian Church in Watertown, New York.

In 1883, he pursued a post-graduate course at Syracuse University where he earned his Ph.D. Illinois College awarded him a Doctor of Divinity degree in 1902, and the University of Rochester awarded him a Doctorate in Law the same year. In 1885, he traveled to Germany for a year of study and research in German universities, obtaining a Doctor of Sacred Theology degree at the University of Jena.

== Yale professorship ==
On his return from Germany, he was called to the position of professor of New Testament criticism at Yale Divinity School, a position he held from 1886 to 1895, when he was chosen to fill the chair of systematic theology, which he held until his death in New Haven on June 22, 1906.

== Personal and family ==
On November 23, 1880, a few months after graduating from Yale, Stevens married Kate Abell Mattison of Oswego, New York. They had two children, Margaret and Mary.

He enjoyed outdoor sports and served on the boards of the Yale National Bank in New Haven, and the E. H. H. Smith Silver Company of Bridgeport. Politically, he was a Republican.

== Works ==
- A Short Exposition of the Epistle to the Galatians (1890)
- The Pauline Theology (1892)
- The Johannine Theology (1894)
- Doctrine and Life (1895)
- The life, Letters, and Journals of the Rev. and Hon. Peter Parker (1896)
- The Epistles of Paul and Hebrews in Modern English, a Paraphrase (1898)
- Theology of the New Testament (textbook; 1899)
- The Messages of Paul (1900)
- The Messages of the Apostles (1900)
- The Teaching of Jesus (1901)
- The Christian Doctrine of Salvation (1905)

He also wrote numerous articles for magazines.
