= 54th Massachusetts Infantry Regiment =

African-American Union Army unit of the Civil War (1863–65)

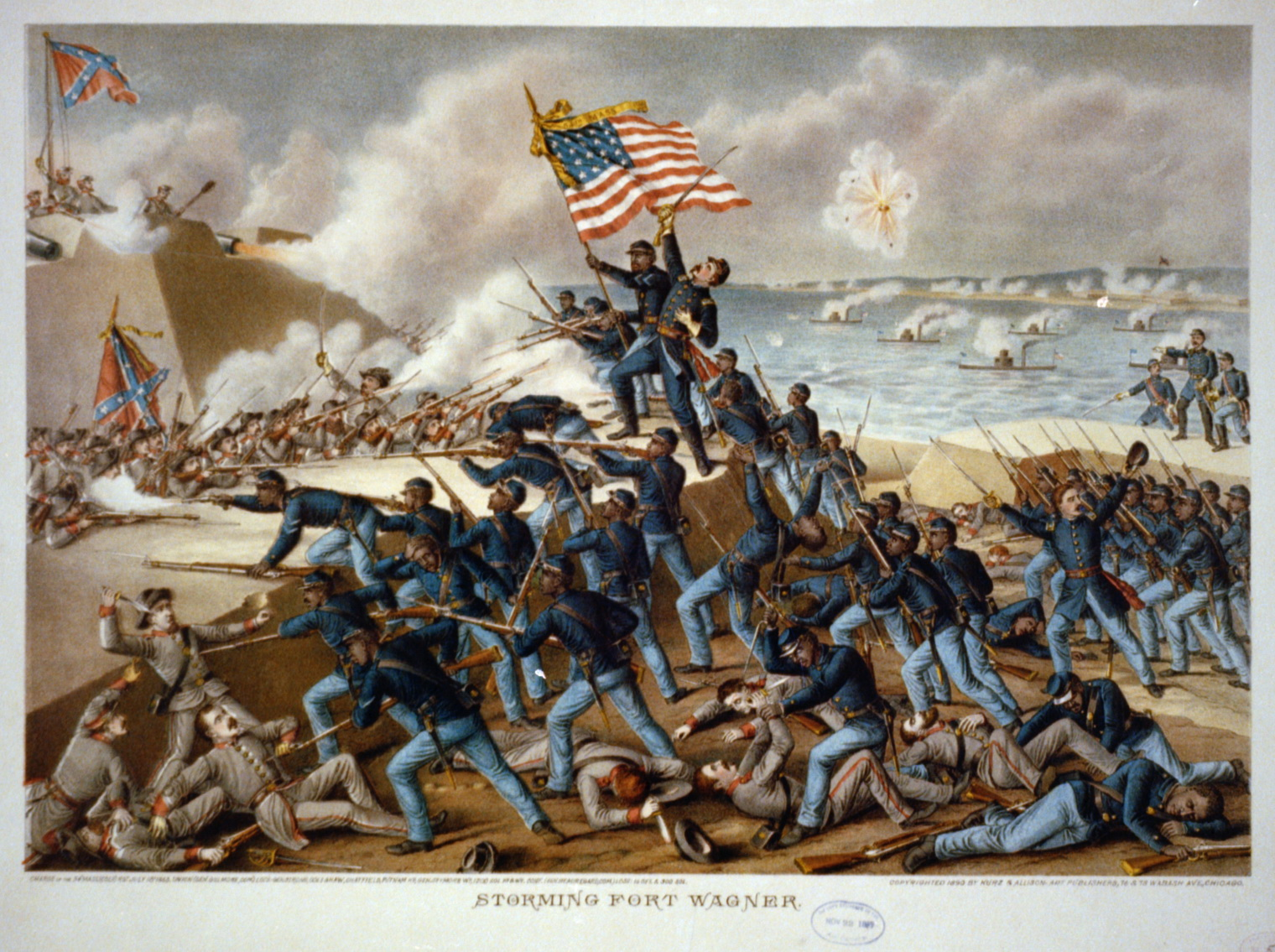
- The 54th Massachusetts at the Second Battle of Fort Wagner, July 18, 1863
- Active: March 13, 1863 – August 4, 1865; November 21, 2008 – present
- Country: United States
- Branch: Union Army
- Type: Infantry
- Size: 1,000 (as of May 1863)
- Engagements: American Civil War: Battle of Grimball's Landing; Second Battle of Fort Wagner; Battle of Olustee; Battle of Honey Hill; Battle of Boykin's Mill

Commanders
- Colonel: Robert Gould Shaw
- Colonel: Edward Needles Hallowell

The 54th Massachusetts Infantry Regiment is an infantry regiment that saw extensive service in the Union Army during the American Civil War. The unit was the second African-American regiment, following the 1st Kansas Colored Volunteer Infantry Regiment, organized in the Northern states during the Civil War. Authorized by the Emancipation Proclamation, the regiment consisted of African-American enlisted men commanded by white officers. The 54th Massachusetts was a major force in the pioneering of African-American civil war regiments, with 150 all-black regiments being raised after the raising of the 54th Massachusetts.

The unit began recruiting in February 1863 and trained at Camp Meigs on the outskirts of Boston, Massachusetts. Prominent abolitionists were active in recruitment efforts, including Frederick Douglass, whose two sons were among the first to enlist. Massachusetts Governor John Albion Andrew, who had long pressured the U.S. Department of War to begin recruiting African-Americans, placed a high priority on the formation of the 54th Massachusetts. Andrew appointed Robert Gould Shaw, the son of Boston abolitionists, to command the regiment as Colonel. The free black community in Boston was also instrumental in recruiting efforts, utilizing networks reaching beyond Massachusetts and even into the Southern states to attract soldiers and fill out the ranks. After it departed from Massachusetts on May 28, 1863, the 54th Massachusetts was shipped to Beaufort, South Carolina, and became part of the X Corps commanded by Major General David Hunter.

During its service with the X Corps, the 54th Massachusetts took part in operations against Charleston, South Carolina, including the Battle of Grimball's Landing on July 16, 1863, and the more famous Second Battle of Fort Wagner on July 18, 1863. During the latter engagement, the 54th Massachusetts, with other Union regiments, executed a frontal assault against Fort Wagner and suffered casualties of 20 killed, 125 wounded, and 102 missing (primarily presumed dead)—roughly 40 percent of the unit's numbers at that time. Col. Robert G. Shaw was killed on the parapet of Fort Wagner. In 1864, as part of the Union Army's Department of Florida, the 54th Massachusetts took part in the Battle of Olustee.

The service of the 54th Massachusetts, particularly their charge at Fort Wagner, soon became one of the most famous episodes of the war, interpreted through artwork, poetry, and song. More recently, the 54th Massachusetts gained prominence in popular culture through the 1989 Oscar-winning film Glory.

== Organization and early service ==
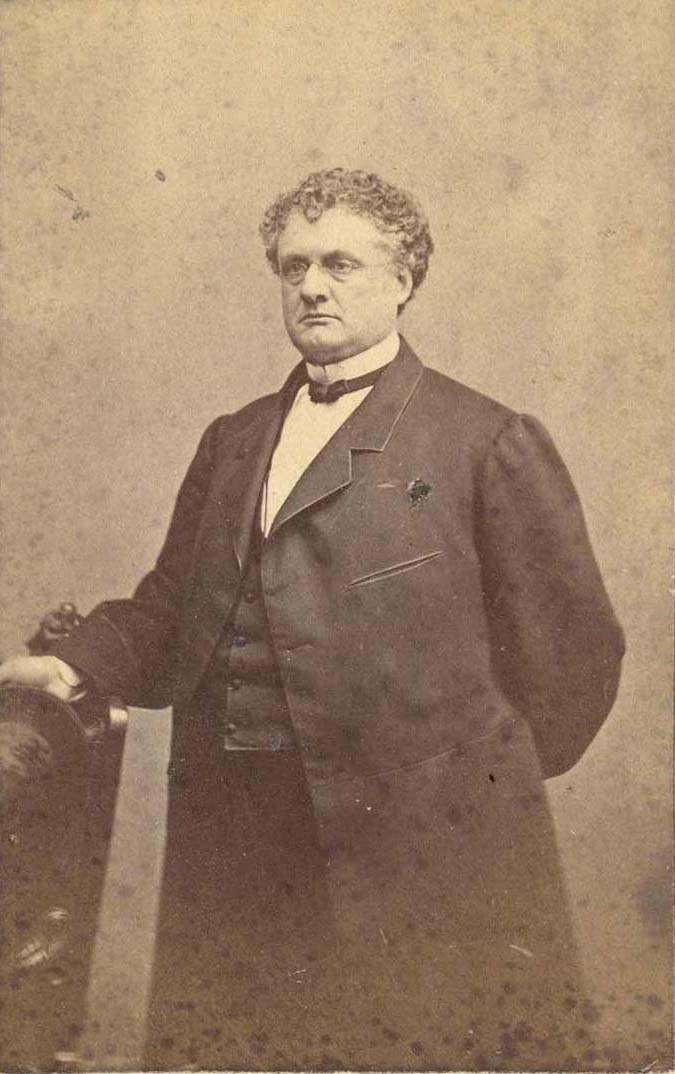
Massachusetts Gov. John A. Andrew ordered the formation of the 54th Massachusetts after receiving authorization from Secretary of War Stanton

General recruitment of African Americans for service in the Union Army was authorized by the Emancipation Proclamation issued by President Lincoln on January 1, 1863. Secretary of War Edwin M. Stanton accordingly instructed the Governor of Massachusetts, John A. Andrew, to begin raising regiments including "persons of African descent" on January 26, 1863. Andrew selected Robert Gould Shaw to be the regiment's colonel and Norwood Penrose "Pen" Hallowell to be its lieutenant colonel. Like many officers of regiments of African-American troops, both Robert Gould Shaw and Hallowell, captains at the time, were promoted several grades. The rest of the officers were evaluated by Shaw and Hallowell: these officers included Luis Emilio, and Garth Wilkinson "Wilkie" James, brother of Henry James and William James. Many of these officers were of abolitionist families, and Governor Andrew himself chose several. Lt. Col. Norwood Hallowell was joined by his younger brother Edward Needles Hallowell, who commanded the 54th as a full colonel for the rest of the war after Shaw's death. Twenty-four of the 29 officers were veterans, but only six had been previously commissioned.

The soldiers were recruited by black abolitionists like Frederick Douglass and Major Martin Robison Delany, M.D., and white abolitionists, including Shaw's parents. Lieutenant J. Appleton, the first white man commissioned in the regiment, posted a notice in the Boston Journal. Wendell Phillips and Edward L. Pierce spoke at a Joy Street Church recruiting rally, encouraging free blacks to enlist. About 100 people were actively involved in recruitment, including those from Joy Street Church and a group of individuals appointed by Governor Andrew to enlist black men for the 54th. Among those appointed was George E. Stephens, African-American military correspondent to the Weekly Anglo-African who recruited over 200 men in Philadelphia and would go on to serve as a First Sergeant in the 54th.

The 54th trained at Camp Meigs in Readville near Boston. While there, they received considerable moral support from abolitionists in Massachusetts, including Ralph Waldo Emerson. Material support included warm clothing items, battle flags, and $500 contributed for the equipping and training of a regimental band. The new regimental flag was described as "...superb white silk had on one side the coat of arms of Massachusetts, and on the other a golden cross on a golden star, with in hoc signo vinces beneath..." As it became evident that many more recruits were coming forward than were needed, the medical exam for the 54th was described as "rigid and thorough" by the Massachusetts Surgeon-General. This resulted in what he described as "a more robust, strong and healthy set of men were never mustered into the service of the United States." Despite this, as was common in the Civil War, a few men died of disease before the 54th departed from Camp Meigs.

By most accounts, the 54th left Boston with very high morale. This was despite the fact that Jefferson Davis's proclamation of December 23, 1862, effectively put both African-American enlisted men and white officers under a death sentence if captured on the grounds that they were inciting servile insurrection.

== Deployment to South Carolina ==
After muster into federal service on May 13, 1863, the 54th left Boston with fanfare on May 28, and arrived to more celebrations in Beaufort, South Carolina. They were greeted by local blacks and by Northern abolitionists, some of whom had deployed from Boston a year earlier as missionaries to the Port Royal Experiment.

In Beaufort, they joined with the 2nd South Carolina Volunteers, a unit of South Carolina freedmen led by James Montgomery. After the 2nd Volunteers' successful Raid at Combahee Ferry, Montgomery led both units in a raid on the town of Darien, Georgia. The population had fled, and Montgomery ordered the soldiers to loot and burn the empty town. Shaw objected to this activity and complained over Montgomery's head that burning and looting were not suitable activities for his model regiment.

=== Battle of Grimball's Landing ===
The regiment's first engagement took place during the Battle of Grimball's Landing on James Island, just outside of Charleston, South Carolina, on July 16, 1863. The Union attack on James Island was intended to draw Confederate troops away from Fort Wagner in anticipation of an upcoming Union assault on the fort. During the Battle of Grimball's Landing, the 54th Massachusetts stopped a Confederate advance, taking 45 casualties in the process.

In an account of the engagement, which was later published, First Sergeant Robert John Simmons of the 54th Massachusetts (a British Army veteran from Bermuda) described a "desperate battle" in which about 250 pickets of the regiment were attacked by about 900 Confederates. He estimated that a reserve of 3,000 men supported the Confederates in their front. The 54th Massachusetts stopped the Confederate advance then, as he described, "had to fire and retreat toward our own encampment."

After the engagement, their division commander, Brig. Gen. Alfred H. Terry, complimented "steadiness and soldierly conduct" of 54th Massachusetts by courier to Col. Shaw and in his official report of the action. This recognition raised the morale of the regiment.

=== Battle of Fort Wagner ===
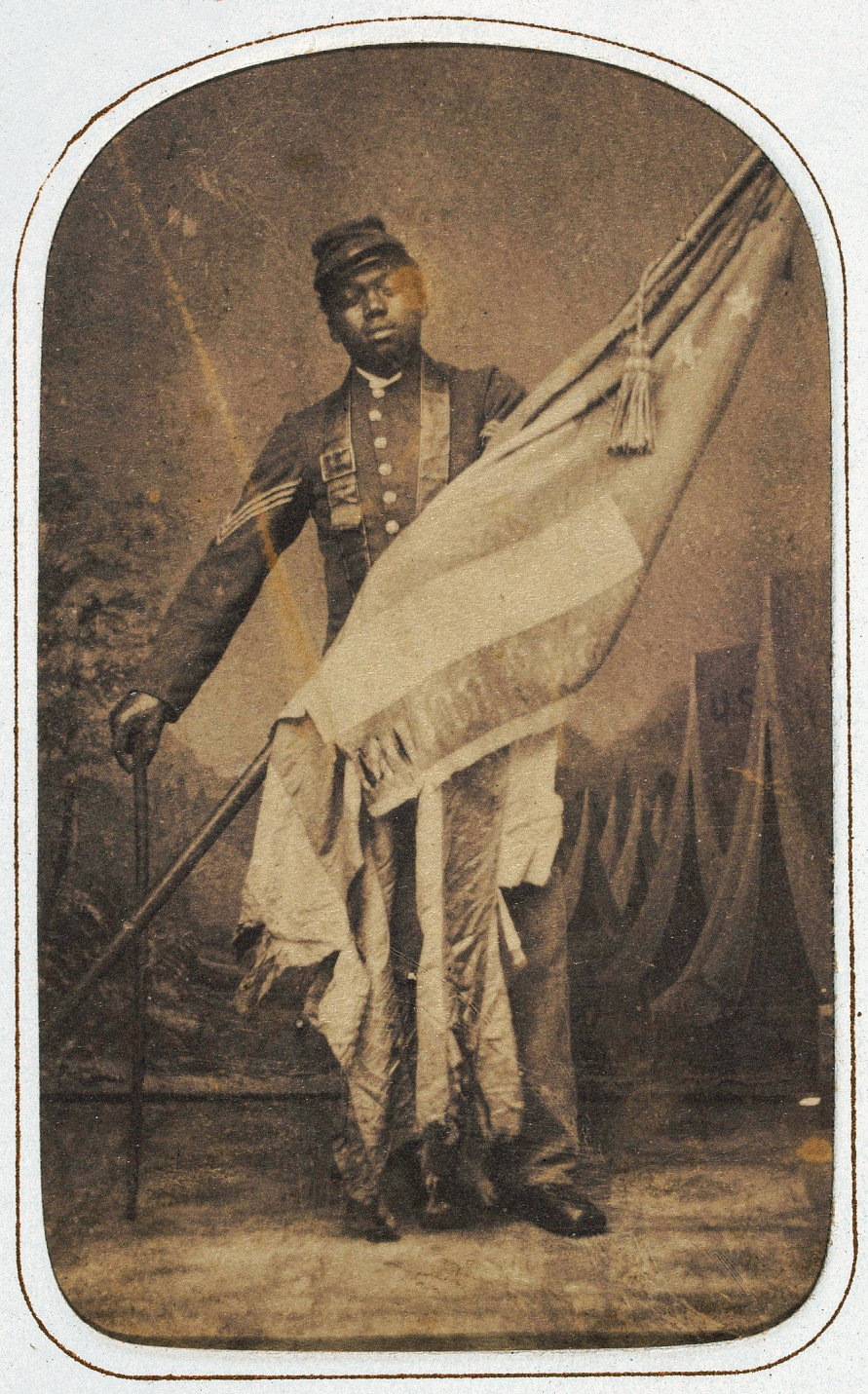
William Harvey Carney circa 1864

The regiment gained widespread acclaim on July 18, 1863, when it spearheaded an assault on Fort Wagner, a key position overlooking the water approach to Charleston Harbor. The 54th Massachusetts had only recently returned from James Island after a difficult withdrawal during which they spent two days without food. They returned to the main Union force late on the afternoon of July 18 and the tired and hungry men were immediately placed in the vanguard of the assault force of 4,000 men. The assault was launched at 7:45 pm along a narrow spit of land. The distance to the Confederate line was some 1,600 yards (4,800 ft), and the spit and treacherous marshland's narrow confines disorganized the attackers. The approach required them to pass beyond some of the Confederate fortifications before turning to make their assault. The men crossed a water-filled ditch and took the fort's outer wall. Because of the strength of the defending force, the position could only be held for an hour before the two Union brigades were withdrawn at around 9:00 pm.

The 54th Massachusetts numbered 600 men at the time of the assault. Of these, 270 were killed, wounded, or captured during the engagement. Col. Shaw was killed, along with 29 of his men; 24 more later died of wounds, 15 were captured, 52 were missing in action and never accounted for, and 149 were wounded. These casualties represented the highest in the history of the regiment during a single engagement. Two company commanders were killed during the attack.

Although Union forces were not able to take and hold the fort, the 54th was widely acclaimed for its valor during the battle, and the event helped encourage the further enlistment and mobilization of African-American troops, a critical development that President Abraham Lincoln once noted as helping to secure the final victory. Decades later, Sergeant William Harvey Carney was awarded the Medal of Honor for grabbing the U.S. flag as the flag bearer fell, carrying the flag to the enemy ramparts and back, and saying "Boys, the old flag never touched the ground!" which would be turned into a song in his honor in 1900. While other African Americans had since been granted the award by the time it was presented to Carney, Carney's is the earliest action for which the Medal of Honor was awarded to an African American.

After the battle of Fort Wagner many officers had been killed leading to vacancies in leadership. Non-commissioned officers exercised de-facto control of their companies due to these vacancies. Rather than promote black soldiers to these open roles, inexperienced whites were brought from other regiments to lead the 54th Massachusetts, many of whom lacked the same anti-slavery convictions as the previous white officers.

== Deployment in Florida ==
=== Battle of Olustee ===
The 54th saw action in the Battle of Olustee, which was fought in Baker County, Florida, on February 20, 1864. It was the largest battle fought in Florida during the war. Union General Truman Seymour had landed troops at Jacksonville and aimed chiefly to disrupt the Confederate food supply. Meeting little resistance, he proceeded towards the state capital, Tallahassee, against orders since he assumed that he would face only the small Florida militia. Confederates in Charleston sent reinforcements under General Alfred H. Colquitt, and the two armies collided near Ocean Pond in Olustee.

The Union forces were repulsed and retreated to Jacksonville. Some were garrisoned there to occupy territory. Other troops were transferred to other more active areas, where they were needed.

Under the command of now-Colonel Edward Hallowell, the 54th fought a rear-guard action covering the Union retreat to Jacksonville, Florida, after their defeat at the Battle of Olustee. During the retreat they, along with the 35th United States Colored Troops, were able to repulse the Confederate advance and secure the Union withdrawal to Jacksonville. The 54th Massachusetts was sent up from the reserves into the fight as the seventh New Hampshire and Eighth Colored Troops broke into retreat. It was here that their delaying action covered the withdrawal of the Union forces, with the 54th Massachusetts expending over 20,000 rounds of ammunition. After the Battle there was a large number of wounded soldiers and abandoned equipment from the 54th Massachusetts, as well as the Federal Cavalry, and part of the 7th Connecticut. Fortunately for the Union forces, the Confederate pursuit of their massive retreat was poorly executed, and the Union soldiers were able to retreat to safety. While retreating, the unit was suddenly ordered to counter-march back to Ten Mile station. The locomotive of a train carrying wounded Union soldiers had broken down, and the wounded were in danger of capture. When the 54th arrived, the men attached ropes to the engine and cars and manually pulled the train approximately three miles (4.8 km) to Camp Finegan, where horses were secured to help pull the train. After that, the train was pulled by both men and horses to Jacksonville for a total distance of ten miles (16 km). It took 42 hours to pull the train that distance. The Union army successfully retreated to Jacksonville two days after the battle on February 22. By the end of the ordeal, from the arrival of the 54th Massachusetts to Olustee, the fighting of the battle, and then the retreat back to Jacksonville, the troops had marched roughly 120 miles in a span of four and a half days, causing exhaustion within the regiment.

This defeat at Olustee, along with the Union retreat after the battle, was not without consequences; there were 1,861 total casualties for the Union: 203 deaths, 1,152 wounded, and 506 missing in action. Of that total, 87 casualties came from the 54th Massachusetts during their rearguard action with three officers and 84 enlisted men either being killed, wounded or missing. In contrast to the Confederate forces, this total was greatly imbalanced; with 946 casualties for the Confederates, a 5,400 strong force, roughly equal to what the Union had brought to the battle.

In the aftermath of the war, discrepancies appeared surrounding the battle of Olustee, which revolved around the involvement of the 7th Connecticut and the 54th Massachusetts. Brevet Major General Joseph Hawley, commanding the second brigade of Seymour's army, containing the 7th Connecticut, 7th New Hampshire and Eighth United States Colored Troops, was frustrated by what he considered inaccuracy in newspaper reports. He stated, "The papers are so full of lies that I know that no true history of any event was ever or ever will be written". Hawley wrote to Charles Dudley saying, "Don't publish the damned lie that anybody on foot but the 7th Conn. covered the entire retreat from Olustee. The 'officer' who wrote the lie that the 54th Mass. and the 1st Nor. Car. 'Saved the day' and 'covered the retreat' deserves to be shot.

Later in the Florida campaign, as part of an all-black brigade under Col. Alfred S. Hartwell, the 54th Massachusetts unsuccessfully attacked entrenched Confederate militia at the November 1864 Battle of Honey Hill. In mid-April 1865, they fought at the Battle of Boykin's Mill, a small affair in South Carolina that proved to be one of the last engagements of the war.

== Pay controversy ==
The enlisted men of the 54th were recruited on the promise of pay and allowances equal to their white counterparts. This was supposed to amount to subsistence and $13 a month. Instead, they were informed upon arriving in South Carolina that the Department of the South would pay them only $7 per month ($10 with $3 withheld for clothing, while white soldiers did not pay for clothing at all.) Colonel Shaw and many others immediately began protesting the measure. Joseph Barquet, another member of the regiment, also protested the quality of the food which the soldiers were given, which led to him being court-martialed. Although Massachusetts offered to make up the difference in pay, on principle, a regiment-wide boycott of the pay tables on paydays became the norm.

After Shaw's death at Fort Wagner, Colonel Edward Needles Hallowell took up the fight to get full pay for the troops. Lt. Col. Hooper took command of the regiment starting June 18, 1864. After nearly a month, Colonel Hallowell returned on July 16.

Refusing their reduced pay became a point of honor for the men of the 54th. In fact, at the Battle of Olustee, when ordered forward to protect the retreat of the Union forces, the men moved forward shouting, "Massachusetts and Seven Dollars a Month!"

The Congressional bill, enacted on June 16, 1864, authorized equal and full pay to those enlisted troops who had been free men as of April 19, 1861. Of course, not all the troops qualified. Colonel Hallowell, a Quaker, rationalized that because he did not believe in slavery, he could have all the troops swear that they were free men on April 19, 1861. Before being given their back pay, the entire regiment was administered what became known as "the Quaker oath". Colonel Hallowell skillfully crafted the oath to say: "You do solemnly swear that you owed no man unrequited labor on or before the 19th day of April 1861. So help you God".

On September 28, 1864, the U.S. Congress took action to pay the men of the 54th. Most of the men had served 18 months.

== Legacy ==
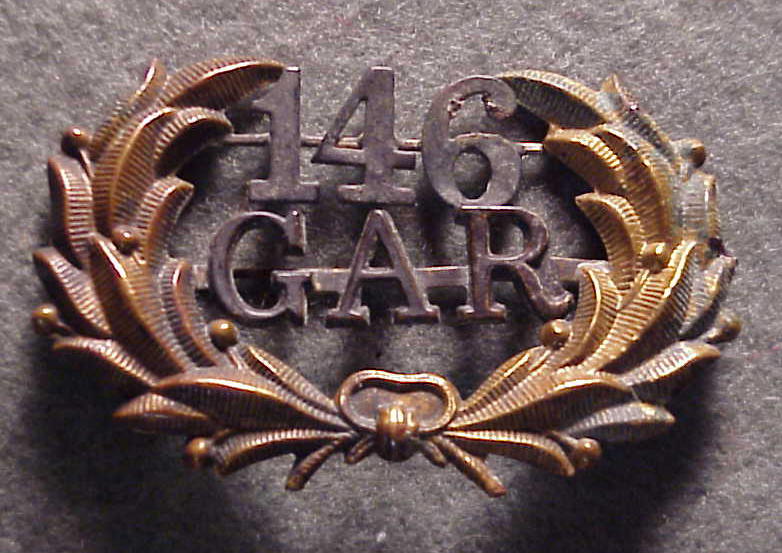
Grand Army of the Republic uniform hat badge from Post No. 146, "RG Shaw Post", established by surviving members of the 54th Massachusetts in 1871

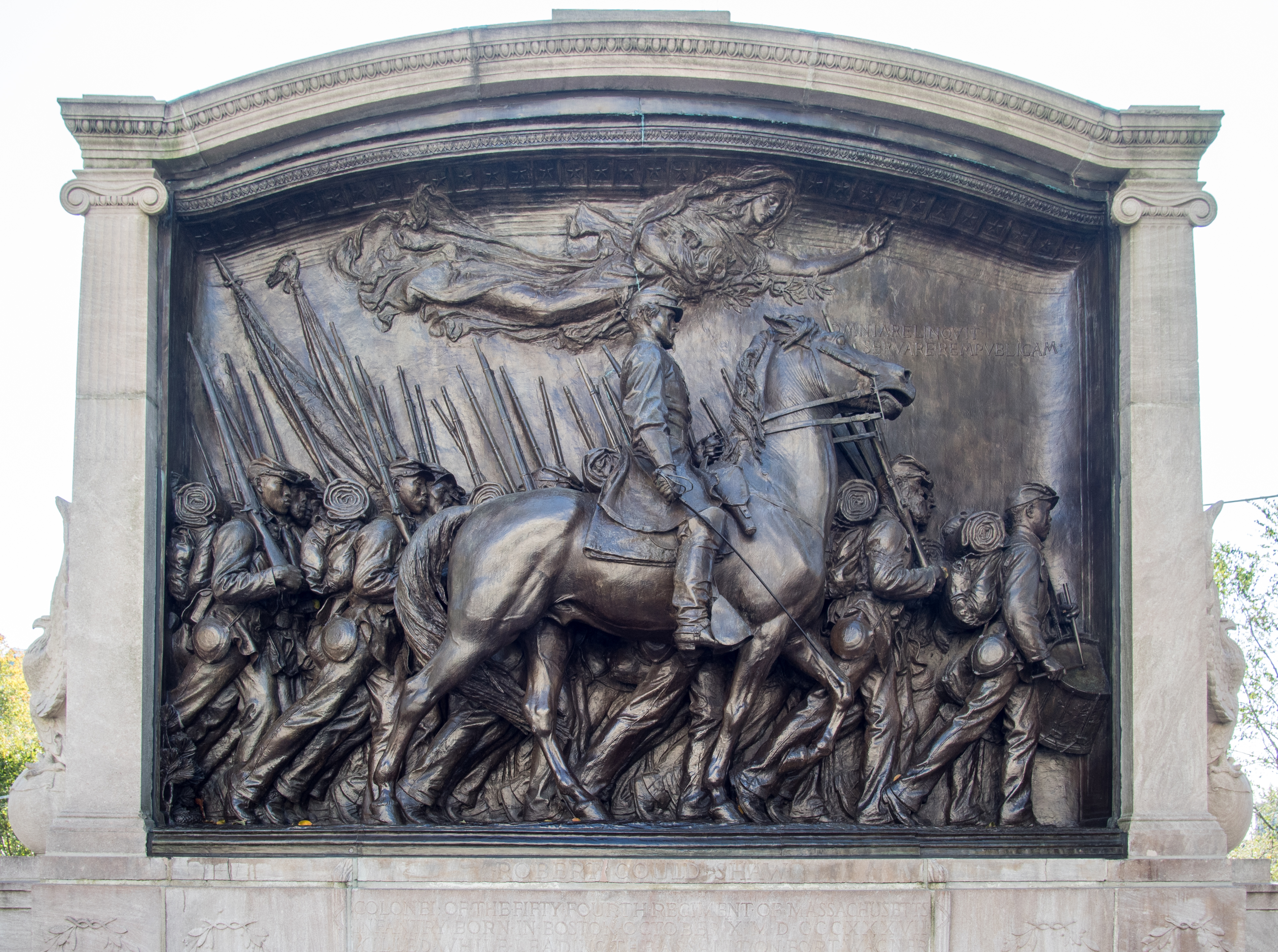
Augustus Saint-Gaudens' 1884 memorial to Col. Shaw and the 54th Massachusetts

A monument to Shaw and the 54th Massachusetts regiment, constructed 1884–1898 by Augustus Saint-Gaudens on the Boston Common, is part of the Boston Black Heritage Trail. In 1897, at the unveiling of the monument in Boston, William James gave a memorial address. A plaster of this monument was displayed in the entryway to the U.S. paintings galleries at the Paris Universal Exposition of 1900. A patinated plaster copy from 1900 is currently displayed in the National Gallery of Art in Washington, D.C.

Governor John A. Andrew said of the regiment, "I know not where, in all of human history, to any given thousand men in arms there has been committed a work at once so proud, so precious, so full of hope and glory."

A composition by Charles Ives, "Col. Shaw and his Colored Regiment", the opening movement of Three Places in New England, is based both on the monument and the regiment.

Sergeant Stephen A. Swails of the 54th Massachusetts regiment became the first African American to receive commission as an officer of a combat regiment of the regular Union army.

Colonel Shaw and his men feature prominently in Robert Lowell's Civil War centennial poem "For the Union Dead." It was originally titled "Colonel Shaw and the Massachusetts' 54th" and published in Life Studies (1959). In the poem, Lowell uses the Robert Gould Shaw memorial as a symbolic device to comment on broader societal change, including racism and segregation, as well as his more personal struggle to cope with a rapidly changing Boston.

A Union officer had asked the Confederates at Battery Wagner for the return of Shaw's body but was informed by the Confederate commander, Brigadier General Johnson Hagood, "We buried him with his niggers." Shaw's father wrote in response that he was proud that Robert, a fierce fighter for equality, had been buried in that manner. "We hold that a soldier's most appropriate burial-place is on the field where he has fallen." As a recognition and honor, at the end of the Civil War, the 1st South Carolina Volunteers, and the 33rd Colored Regiment were mustered out at the Battery Wagner site of the mass burial of the 54th Massachusetts.

The story of the regiment was depicted in the 1989 Academy Award-winning film Glory, starring Matthew Broderick as Shaw, Denzel Washington as Private Trip, Morgan Freeman, Cary Elwes, Jihmi Kennedy and Andre Braugher The film re-established the now-popular image of the combat role African Americans played in the Civil War, and the unit, often represented in historical battle reenactments, now has the nickname the "Glory" regiment. Historian David W. Blight suggested "missed filmic opportunities" that might have been included the movie.

== 2008 reactivation ==
The unit was reactivated on November 21, 2008, to serve as the Massachusetts Army National Guard ceremonial unit to render military honors at funerals and state functions. The new unit is known as the 54th Massachusetts Volunteer Regiment.

=== Living history and reenactment ===
54th Mass Volunteer Infantry Company A is a living history and reenactment group based in Hyde Park, Massachusetts where the original regiment was formed. The company marches during key holidays, events and ceremonies. When invited, they also stage information booths, provide talks to educate the public about the 54th and participate in historical reenactments along the east coast. The group is affiliated with the official Massachusetts National Guard 54th regiment and often do events together.

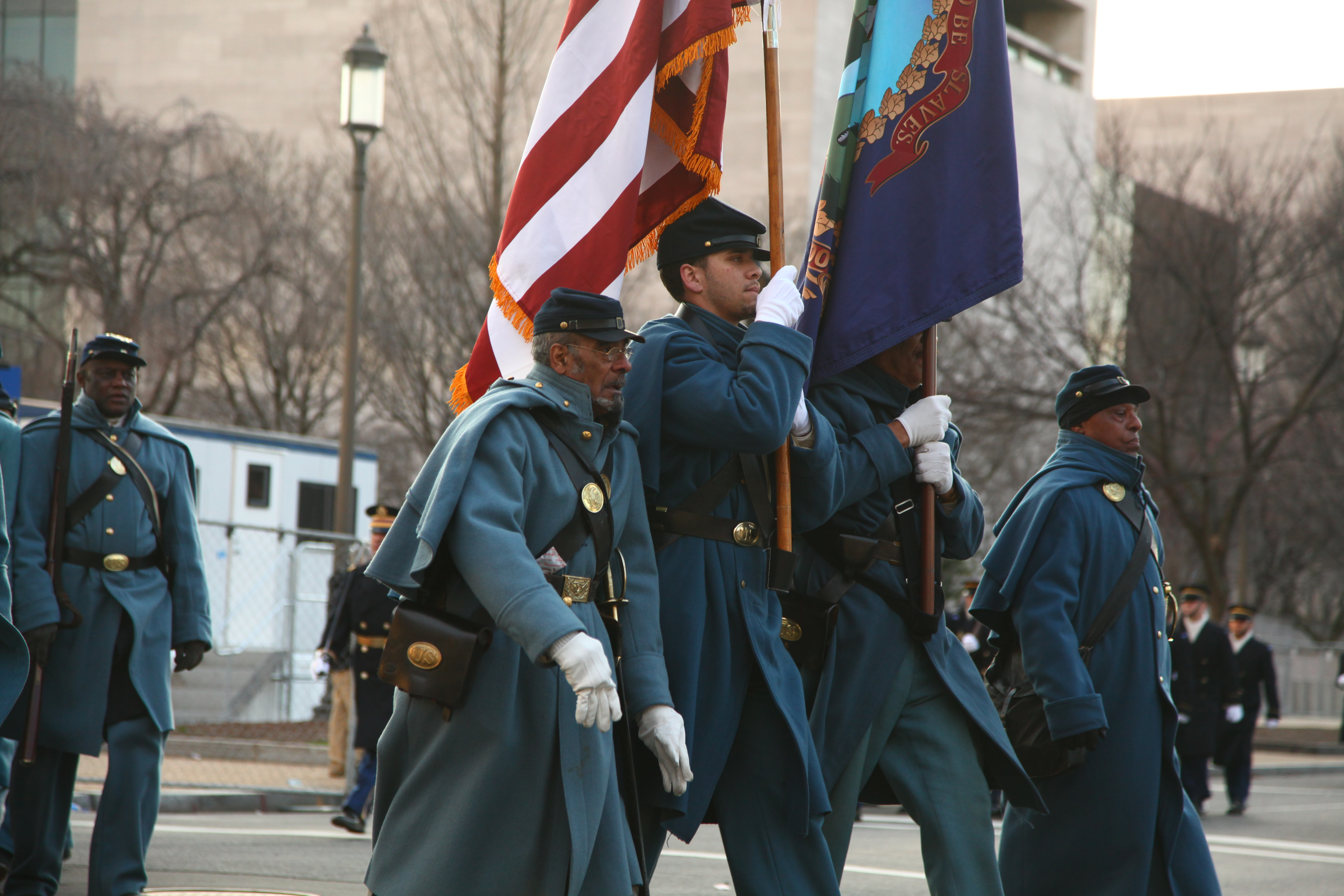
Company A marches at a Presidential Inauguration

Company A office is located at 55-59 Harvard Ave, in Hyde Park, and drill at historic Camp Meigs Playground.

== See also ==
- 55th Massachusetts Infantry Regiment
- Massasoit Guards
- Chester "Bromley" Hoke (1847–1913)
