= List of American Civil War brevet generals =

This is a list of American Civil brevet generals that served the Union Army. This list of brevet major generals or brevet brigadier generals currently contains a section which gives the names of officers who held lower actual or substantive grades (often referred to as ranks) in the Union Army, were not promoted to full actual or substantive grade generals during or immediately after the war, but were awarded the grade of brevet major general or brevet brigadier general, almost always in recognition of service, not as any form of promotion. The first section shows these officers' actual grades and regiments or assignments. Dates in the list are explained below.

The lists of general officers who were in active service as or were promoted to the grade of brigadier general or major general, or in the case of Ulysses S. Grant, lieutenant general, in the Regular Army of the United States at the start of or during the Civil War and of officers who were appointed as brigadier generals or major generals in the volunteer forces which constituted most of the Union Army, who were awarded brevet general grades have been moved to a draft user page for revision and reduction in length. Information on brevet appointments or awards for these officers still may be found at List of American Civil War Generals (Union).

A small number of these awards were made before the generals who received them were promoted to full actual grade generals. Many of the awards were brevet major general grades given to full, actual grade regular army or volunteer force brigadier generals. Some volunteer generals also received brevet awards of general officer grades in the Regular Army of the United States, which were higher awards than brevet awards in the volunteer services. The second and third sections have (or will have) the appointment dates for full general promotions since the officers often began acting in the capacity of general officers before they were confirmed and commissioned. These sections have the same information concerning and dates of the brevet awards as have those in the first section.

== Rank dates, other dates ==
Confusion as to the date of a promotion or a brevet award can result because the date often given in connection with an officer's promotion or award is the date of rank. The appointment, nomination, confirmation and commissioning of most Civil War brevet awards occurred in the years 1866 through 1869 but the great majority of these were antedated for purposes of rank to the "omnibus" date of March 13, 1865. Nonetheless, the date shown together with the brevet award grade in the list is the date of rank, which is simply a date marking seniority or precedence in rank. The date of rank of a promotion or brevet award often is the date associated with the promotion or award in reference to the officer who received the promotion or award in writings about the person or the war. Thus, the rank date is included in the sections of the list below with the grade because of its frequent use in reference to an officer's brevet awards, not because the date of rank is usually any of the significant dates in the process of promotion or award of appointment, nomination, confirmation or commission. Since commission dates are not easily obtained and are usually near the U.S. Senate confirmation dates for brevet awards, which are found in Eicher, Civil War High Commands (2001) and other sources, brevet award confirmation dates are shown for each officer's awards. These dates are frequently the approximate effective date of the appointment or award. The further step of commissioning almost always took place, barring death of the nominee, without great delay, usually within one or a few weeks. Other dates are not shown below due to the absence of ready access to information about appointment dates for brevet awards and to save space.

Some additional significant dates for some officers are shown in the notes, including some appointment or nomination dates if made by President Abraham Lincoln and the date an officer left the service. An appointment or nomination made by President Lincoln means the officer could have exercised command at his brevet grade, if so assigned, and been referred to as a general during the course of the war.

A date in parentheses after "nomination" is the first date the appointment was submitted to the U.S. Senate for confirmation. That nomination was not acted upon or improved and had to be resubmitted (sometimes twice). The date following the date in parentheses is the date of the nomination which Congress acted upon.

== Purpose, significance and effect of award ==
President Lincoln commissioned only 58 brevet grade generals. A few of these awards were even issued posthumously although death of the nominee would usually end the promotion or award process. The list notes (or will note) the officers who were nominated for brevet awards by President Lincoln and confirmed by the U.S. Senate before April 1865. All of the other awards were made by President Andrew Johnson and confirmed by the U.S. Senate during Johnson's term of office. Thus, Civil War brevet awards were almost always honors without any command, operational or assignment significance or extra compensation since the war was over when most of the awards were confirmed and the awards were issued. Most of the officers nominated for brevet awards had been mustered out, or were supernumeraries soon to be mustered out, when the awards were confirmed. Many awards were made to lower grade staff officers for faithful and efficient services.

A few of the brevet generals appointed by President Lincoln did perform valuable service in general officer positions. Their authority was enhanced by assignment to positions with general officer responsibilities, mostly during the last months of the war, by General Grant. Some of the brevet generals appointed later may have served in general officer jobs, generally for short periods of time, during the war. The brevet awards could not convert these officers into generals retroactively no matter how valuable their service may have been. Many other officers with lower full, permanent grades also rendered distinguished temporary service in higher grade assignments without receiving brevet awards so caution must be made about exaggerating the significance of the later brevet award. It may be noted that over 6,000 brevet awards of grades below general were awarded during and after the Civil War. Many of these awards were made to regular army officers with lower permanent grades who were serving in higher grades in the volunteer force or to officers who also received brevet general awards.

The only medal available for award to soldiers of the Union Army was the Medal of Honor so brevet awards were prized as a mark of distinguished service, especially for officers who served with distinction but did not perform the heroic acts on the battlefield. These heroic acts were almost always the basis for the Medal of Honor.

== Award process ==
In outline, the main steps of the promotion or brevet award process were as follows. After a candidate for a general officer commission or brevet award was selected, the Secretary of War, on behalf of the President, would send the candidate an appointment letter. The candidate would be asked to communicate acceptance of the appointment or award, attest to the oath of office and report to a named officer for orders. The letter would note that the appointment was contingent on the President nominating and the U.S. Senate confirming the promotion or award. Nonetheless, the candidate often received orders to begin acting in the appointed office pending the President's nomination and the Senate's confirmation or rejection of the nomination. If a nominee was confirmed, the President and Secretary of War (or of the Navy) would sign and seal a commission and transmit it to the nominee. The appointment was not official or complete until all the steps in the process were completed and the commission was conveyed in writing. Usually this occurred soon after the confirmation of the promotion or award, often within about a week. Since most of the brevet awards were made after the end of the war, candidates would not be told to report to a senior officer for orders unless they were still on duty and might be given some higher or different assignment. Full grade promotions supersede brevet grade promotions and promotions in the regular army supersede promotions to equivalent or lower rank in the volunteer forces.

== Definitions, abbreviations ==
Following the usage of the Eichers in Civil War High Commands, "grade" signifies the position or level in the officer hierarchy (e.g. brigadier general, major general) and "rank" refers to the order of precedence within the grade, signified by the date from which the award "ranks", regardless of the actual date of appointment by the President of the United States or confirmation by the United States Senate. As the Eichers acknowledge, "rank" is commonly used in reference to an officer's grade despite their explanation of the different terms for military officers' positions and precedence. The Eichers effort to change the common usage of the word "rank" for grade is probably futile. This usage can be found in documents that even precede the Civil War. A change in usage might create more confusion than it eliminates but "grade" will be used on this page, especially in the column headings, since the reason for this use is explained in this introduction.

Some abbreviations are used in the entries, especially the notes, to keep the entries more compact. The abbreviation USA means the grade was awarded in the regular United States Army. The abbreviation USV (United States Volunteers) means the grade was awarded in the volunteer army which constituted almost the entire Union Army. All brevet grades are shown with "brevet" or "bvt." Notes are limited for each entry and generally are in a few major categories to keep the size of a large page from increasing more. Many of the brevet (only) general officers and almost all of the regular army or volunteer army actual grade generals have individual pages devoted to them with more information. USMA indicates a graduate of the United States Military Academy at West Point, New York. Medal of Honor awards are noted. A note is made for those killed in action or died of wounds received in action or otherwise died during the war. Resignation, retirement and muster out dates for volunteer officers are (or will be) noted, although they were omitted in the original version of the page. Pre-war and post-war state governors, U.S. Senators and U.S. Representatives are noted. If a specific action is not noted as the reason for the award, it was for services which were described as "meritorious services" or "gallant and meritorious services" or "long and faithful services" or "faithful and meritorious services" "during the war" or some similar form of words, as also noted above. The List of American Civil War Generals (Union) and the individual pages for each general have more details about each officer so details and dates other than those mentioned in this introduction are omitted from the following list.

== No Confederate brevet awards ==
The Confederate government did not award brevet grades to Confederate States Army officers although Confederate army regulations would have allowed them.

== Sources ==
The United States War Department sources (written by former Confederate Brigadier General Marcus Joseph Wright), in the references section, list the generals', and in the case of the Union generals, the brevet generals', grade, rank date, appointment date, and confirmation date. The Confederate generals list is included because it may be used as a reference in a few notes. The other six references have short summaries of each general's life and service. A few of the sources do not list every general, however. Some sources may have information that others do not. All the information in this list is from one or more of these references. The summaries in the references are in alphabetical order. Since the information in this article is from a limited number of sources, all of which are in alphabetical order, in-line notes have been largely omitted since the information is easily found on consecutive pages in one or more of the referenced books. A full listing of citations for each unique entry in one or more boxes for each general or brevet general would show thousands of citations, which would be a large use of space for little real return of information. The information in the list can easily be found and verified by anyone who has access to some or all of the six sources.

Union brevet generals:	A	B	C	D	E	F	G	H	I	J	K	L	M	N	O	P	Q	R	S	T	U	V	W	X	Y	Z

== Union brevet generals; lower actual, substantive grade ==
=== A ===
Name	Highest actual grade	Unit	Brevet grade, rank date	Date confirmed	Notes, other dates
Abbot, Henry Larcom	Colonel	1st Regiment Connecticut Volunteer Heavy Artillery	Bvt. Brig. Gen. USV, August 1, 1864; Bvt. Brig. Gen. USA, March 13, 1865; Bvt. Maj. Gen. USV, March 13, 1865	February 20, 1865; July 23, 1866; March 12, 1866	USMA, 1854. Mustered out of volunteers September 25, 1865. Bvt. Brig. Gen. USV for Overland Campaign and Petersburg. Retired as Regular Army colonel, 1895. Post-retirement promotion to brigadier general, USA, April 23, 1904. Died October 1, 1927, aged 96.
Abbott, Henry Livermore	Major	20th Regiment Massachusetts Volunteer Infantry	Bvt. Brig. Gen. USV, March 13, 1865	February 20, 1865	Harvard University 1860. Killed at the Battle of the Wilderness, May 6, 1864. Nominated by Pres. Lincoln, December 12, 1864. Posthumous brevet for the Wilderness.
Abbott, Ira Coray	Colonel	1st Regiment Michigan Volunteer Infantry	Bvt. Brig. Gen. USV, March 13, 1865	March 28, 1867	Resigned December 22, 1864.
Abbott, Joseph Carter	Colonel	7th Regiment New Hampshire Volunteer Infantry	Bvt. Brig. Gen. USV, January 15, 1865	February 14, 1865	Phillips Academy, 1846. Brevet for capture of Fort Fisher. Nominated by Pres. Lincoln, January 23, 1865. Mustered out July 17, 1865.
Abert, William Stretch	Colonel	3rd Regiment Massachusetts Volunteer Heavy Artillery	Bvt. Brig. Gen. USV, March 13, 1865	March 12, 1866	Mustered out of volunteers September 18, 1865. Died of yellow fever as Regular Army major, August 25, 1867.
Acker, George Sigourney	Colonel	9th Regiment Michigan Volunteer Cavalry	Bvt. Brig. Gen. USV, March 13, 1865	April 10, 1866; July 26, 1866	Brevet for Knoxville and Atlanta Campaigns especially, Battles of Bean's Station and Cynthiana. Resigned June 27, 1865.
Adams, Alonzo W.	Colonel	1st Regiment New York Volunteer Cavalry	Bvt. Brig. Gen. USV, March 13, 1865	March 28, 1867	Mexican–American War veteran. Mustered out June 27, 1865.
Adams, Jr., Charles Francis	Colonel	5th (Colored) Regiment Massachusetts Volunteer Cavalry	Bvt. Brig. Gen. USV, March 13, 1865	July 23, 1866	Harvard University, 1856. Grandson of President John Quincy Adams. Brevet for Battle of Secessionville, Battle of South Mountain and Battle of Antietam. Resigned August 1, 1865.
Adams, Charles Powell	Lt. Colonel	Hatch's Battalion, Minnesota Volunteer Cavalry	Bvt. Brig. Gen. USV, March 13, 1865	July 23, 1866	Ohio Medical College, 1851. Mustered out April 26, 1866.
Adams, Charles W.	Colonel	12th Regiment Kansas Volunteer Infantry	Bvt. Brig. Gen. USV, February 13, 1865	March 3, 1865	Son-in-law of U.S. Senator James H. Lane. Nominated by Pres. Lincoln, February 20, 1865. Mustered out June 30, 1865.
Adams, Robert Newton	Colonel	81st Regiment Ohio Volunteer Infantry	Bvt. Brig. Gen. USV, March 13, 1865	March 12, 1866	Miami University. Mustered out July 13, 1865.
Adams, William A.	Colonel	145th Regiment Indiana Volunteer Infantry	Bvt. Brig. Gen. USV, March 13, 1865	March 12, 1866; April 10, 1866	Hanover College. Award in both January and February, 1866, likely correction. Mustered out January 21, 1866.
Agnus, Felix	Major	165th Regiment New York Volunteer Infantry	Bvt. Brig. Gen. USV, March 13, 1865	February 16, 1869	Born in France. College de Jolie Clair, Paris. Served in French Army. Resigned July 26, 1865. Died October 31, 1925, aged 86.
Albright, Charles	Colonel	202nd Regiment Pennsylvania Volunteer Infantry	Bvt. Brig. Gen. USV, March 7, 1865	March 10, 1865	Dickinson College. U.S. House of Representatives, 1873–1875. Nominated by Pres. Lincoln, March 7, 1865. Mustered out August 3, 1865.
Alden, Alonzo	Colonel	169th Regiment New York Volunteer Infantry	Bvt. Brig. Gen. USV, January 15, 1865	March 3, 1865	Williams College. Nominated by Pres. Lincoln, February 18, 1865. Mustered out July 19, 1865.
Alexander, Andrew Jonathan	Lt. Colonel	Asst. Adjutant Gen. USV	Bvt. Brig. Gen. USV, January 5, 1865; Bvt. Brig. Gen. USA, April 16, 1865	February 6, 1865; April 8, 1867	Centre College. Brevet for Battle of Ebenezer Church, Alabama and Battle of Columbus, Georgia. USV nomination by Pres. Lincoln, January 6, 1865. Retired as Regular Army lieutenant colonel, July 3, 1885.
Alexander, Barton Stone	Major	Corps of Engineers, USA	Bvt. Brig. Gen. USA, March 13, 1865	May 4, 1866	USMA, 1842. Major, USA, March 3, 1863. Lt. Colonel, USA, March 7, 1867. Died as Regular Army lieutenant colonel, December 17, 1878.
Alexander, Edmund Brooke	Colonel	10th Regiment U.S. Infantry	Bvt. Brig. Gen. USA, October 18, 1865	July 25, 1866	Born October 6, 1802, Haymarket, Virginia. USMA, 1823. Mexican–American War veteran. Retired as Regular Army colonel, February 22, 1869. Died January 3, 1888, Washington, D.C.
Alger, Russell Alexander	Colonel	5th Regiment Michigan Volunteer Cavalry	Bvt. Brig. Gen. USV, June 11, 1865; Bvt. Maj. Gen. USV, June 11, 1865	March 12, 1866; March 2, 1867	Resigned September 20, 1864. Governor of Michigan, 1885–1887. U.S. Secretary of War, 1897–1899. U.S. Senator, 1902–1907 (died January 24).
Allaire, Anthony J.	Lt. Colonel	133rd Regiment New York Volunteer Infantry	Bvt. Brig. Gen. USV, March 13, 1865	February 14, 1868	Mustered out June 6, 1865.
Allcock, Thomas	Lt. Colonel	4th Regiment New York Volunteer Heavy Artillery	Bvt. Brig. Gen. USV, March 13, 1865	April 10, 1866	Born January 27, 1815, Birmingham, England. Brevet for Overland Campaign, Siege of Petersburg. Mustered out December 2, 1865.
Allen, Harrison	Colonel	151st Regiment Pennsylvania Volunteer Infantry	Bvt. Brig. Gen. USV, March 13, 1865	March 28, 1867	Mustered out July 31, 1863.
Allen, Thomas Scott	Colonel	5th Regiment Wisconsin Volunteer Infantry	Bvt. Brig. Gen. USV, March 13, 1865	March 12, 1866	Oberlin College. Mustered out August 2, 1864.
Ames, John Worthington	Colonel	6th Regiment U.S. Colored Infantry	Bvt. Brig. Gen. USV, January 15, 1865	February 23, 1865	Harvard University, 1854. Nominated by Pres. Lincoln, January 18, 1865. Resigned October 4, 1866. U.S. Surveyor-General for California.
Ames, William	Lt. Colonel	3rd Regiment Rhode Island Volunteer Heavy Artillery	Bvt. Brig. Gen. USV, March 13, 1865	February 6, 1867	Mustered out August 27, 1865.
Amory, Thomas Jonathan Coffin	Colonel	17th Regiment Massachusetts Volunteer Infantry	Bvt. Brig. Gen. USV, October 1, 1864	February 5, 1866; March 12, 1866; December 3, 1867	USMA, 1851. Nominated by Pres. Lincoln, October 1, 1864. Posthumous brevet. Last confirmation corrected rank date. U.S. Army major. Died at Beaufort, North Carolina, October 7, 1864.
Anderson, Allen Latham	Colonel	8th Regiment California Volunteer Infantry	Bvt. Brig. Gen. USV, March 13, 1865	July 27, 1866	USMA, 1859. Mustered out of volunteers, November 10, 1865. Resigned as U.S. Army captain, 1867.
Anderson, John Fromen	Major	Aide-de-Camp, USV	Bvt. Brig. Gen. USV, March 13, 1865	February 6, 1867	Son of Governor of Maine Hugh J. Anderson. Resigned March 27, 1865.
Anderson, Nicholas Longworth	Colonel	6th Regiment Ohio Volunteer Infantry	Bvt. Brig. Gen. USV, March 13, 1865; Bvt. Maj. Gen. USV, March 13, 1865	February 14, 1868; February 14, 1868	Harvard University, 1858. Bvt. Brig. Gen for Battle of Stone's River. Bvt. Maj. Gen. for Battle of Chickamauga. Mustered out June 23, 1864.
Anderson, William B.	Colonel	60th Regiment Illinois Volunteer Infantry	Bvt. Brig. Gen. USV, March 13, 1865	March 12, 1866	McKendree College. Resigned December 26, 1864. U.S. House of Representatives, 1875–1877.
Andrews, Timothy Patrick	Colonel	Paymaster General, USA	Bvt. Brig. Gen. USA, September 13, 1847	July 14, 1848	Born in Ireland in 1794. War of 1812 veteran. Commanded the Regiment of Voltigeurs and Foot Riflemen during the Mexican–American War. Rejected award of Bvt. Brig. Gen. USA, to date from March 13, 1865, because he already had such a brevet for the Battle of Chapultepec. Retired as Regular Army colonel, November 1864.
Ankeny, Rollin Valentine	Colonel	142nd Regiment Illinois Volunteer Infantry	Bvt. Brig. Gen. USV, March 13, 1865	April 10, 1866	Mustered out October 26, 1864.
Anthony, De Witt Clinton	Colonel	66th Regiment Indiana Volunteer Infantry	Bvt. Brig. Gen. USV, March 13, 1865	February 6, 1867	University of Louisville, 1850. Resigned March 24, 1864.
Appleton, John Francis	Colonel	81st Regiment U.S. Colored Infantry	Bvt. Brig. Gen. USV, March 13, 1865	May 18, 1866	Bowdoin College, 1860. Resigned June 29, 1864. Died August 31, 1870, aged 31.
Armstrong, Samuel Chapman	Colonel	8th Regiment U.S. Colored Infantry	Bvt. Brig. Gen. USV, March 13, 1865	March 12, 1866	Born January 26 or 30, 1839, Wailuku, Maui, Sandwich Islands (Hawaii). Williams College, 1862. Mustered out November 10, 1865. Founder of Hampton Institute, Hampton, Virginia.
Askew, Franklin	Colonel	15th Regiment Ohio Volunteer Infantry	Bvt. Brig. Gen. USV, July 14, 1865	March 12, 1866	University of Michigan, 1858. Mustered out November 21, 1865.
Astor, III, John Jacob	Colonel	Additional Aide-de-Camp, USV	Bvt. Brig. Gen. USV, March 13, 1865	July 27, 1866	Columbia University, 1839; Harvard Law School. Also shown as John Jacob Astor, Jr. Mustered out July 11, 1862.
Atkins, Smith Dykins	Colonel	92nd Regiment Illinois Volunteer Infantry	Bvt. Brig. Gen. USV, January 12, 1865; Bvt. Maj. Gen. USV, March 13, 1865	February 14, 1865; April 26, 1866	Rock River Seminary; editor; lawyer. Bvt. Brig. Gen. nomination by Pres. Lincoln, January 23, 1865. Mustered out June 21, 1865.
Averill, John Thomas	Colonel	6th Regiment Minnesota Volunteer Infantry	Bvt. Brig. Gen. USV, October 18, 1865	March 12, 1866	Maine Wesleyan Seminary. Mustered out September 28, 1865. U.S. House of Representatives, 1871–1875.
Avery, Mathew Henry	Colonel	10th Regiment New York Volunteer Cavalry	Bvt. Brig. Gen. USV, March 13, 1865	March 12, 1866	Brevet for Battle of Sailor's Creek. Mustered out July 19, 1865.
Avery, Robert	Lt. Colonel	102nd Regiment New York Volunteer Infantry	Bvt. Brig. Gen. USV, March 13, 1865; Bvt. Maj. Gen. USV, March 13, 1865	July 26, 1866; March 28, 1867	Brevet for gallantry at Battle of Lookout Mountain (lost right leg). USA brevets not confirmed. Retired as U.S. Army lieutenant colonel, 1870. Later, lawyer, manufacturer, railroad official. Post-retirement promotion to Colonel, USA, April 23, 1904.

== Union brevet generals; lower actual, substantive grade ==
=== B ===
Name	Highest actual grade	Unit	Brevet grade, rank date	Date confirmed	Notes, other dates
Babbitt, Edwin Burr	Colonel	Deputy Quartermaster Gen. USA	Bvt. Brig. Gen. USA, March 13, 1865	March 2, 1867	USMA, 1826. Mexican–American War veteran. Retired as Regular Army colonel, 1866.
Babcock, Orville Elias	Lt. Colonel	Aide-de-Camp, USA	Bvt. Brig. Gen. USA, March 13, 1865	July 23, 1866	Staff of Lt. Gen. Ulysses S. Grant, March 29, 1864–July 24, 1866. Colonel, USA, ADC to General Grant, July 25, 1866–March 4, 1869. Secretary to President Grant, 1869. Drowned June 2, 1884.
Babcock, Willoughby	Lt. Colonel	75th Regiment New York Volunteer Infantry	Bvt. Brig. Gen. USV, September 19, 1864	March 24, 1868	Brevet for conspicuous gallantry at Battle of Opequon (Third Battle of Winchester, Virginia), mortally wounded.
Bache, Hartman	Colonel	Corps of Engineers, USA	Bvt. Brig. Gen. USA, March 13, 1865	February 23, 1867	USMA, 1818. Retired as Regular Army colonel, 1867.
Badeau, Adam	Lt. Colonel and Military Secretary	Additional Aide-de-Camp, USV	Bvt. Brig. Gen. USV, April 9, 1865; Bvt. Brig. Gen. USA, March 2, 1867	March 13, 1867; February 14, 1868	Military Secretary to Lt. Gen. Ulysses S. Grant. Bvt. Brig. Gen. USV for Appomattox Campaign.
Baily, Silas Milton	Colonel	8th Regiment Reserves Pennsylvania Volunteer Infantry	Bvt. Brig. Gen. USV, March 13, 1865	July 27, 1866	Brevet for Battle of the Wilderness and Battle of Spotsylvania Court House.
Baker, Benjamin Franklin	Colonel	43rd Regiment New York Volunteer Infantry	Bvt. Brig. Gen. USV, March 13, 1865	March 28, 1867	
Baker, James Heaton	Colonel	10th Regiment Minnesota Volunteer Infantry	Bvt. Brig. Gen. USV, March 13, 1865	March 12, 1866	Minnesota Secretary of State; Ohio Secretary of State
Balch, Joseph P.	Major	1st Rhode Island Detached Militia	Bvt. Brig. Gen. USV, March 13, 1865	July 25, 1868	Mustered out of volunteers, August 2, 1861. Bvt. Lt. Col. and Bvt. Col., March 13, 1865.
Baldey, George Washington	Lt. Colonel	65th Regiment U.S. Colored Infantry	Bvt. Brig. Gen. USV, March 13, 1865	April 10, 1866	Mexican–American War veteran
Baldwin, Charles Pierce	Lt. Colonel	11th Maine Volunteer Infantry Regiment	Bvt. Brig. Gen., USV, April 1, 1865	July 19, 1867	Brevet for Battle of Hatcher's Run, Virginia
Baldwin, William H.	Lt. Colonel	83rd Regiment Ohio Volunteer Infantry	Bvt. Brig. Gen. USV, August 22, 1865	March 12, 1866	Brevet for charge at Battle of Fort Blakeley, Alabama
Ball, William H.	Colonel	122nd Regiment Ohio Volunteer Infantry	Bvt. Brig. Gen. USV, October 19, 1864	February 14, 1865	Brevet for Richmond (Overland Campaign) and Valley Campaigns of 1864.
Ballier, John Frederick	Colonel; Colonel	21st Pennsylvania Volunteer Infantry Regiment; 98th Pennsylvania Volunteer Infantry Regiment	Bvt. Brig. Gen. USV, July 13, 1864	February 14, 1865	Mexican–American War veteran. Brevet for Richmond campaign (Overland Campaign).
Balloch, George Williamson	Lt. Colonel	Commissary Gen. of Subsistence Dept., USV	Bvt. Brig. Gen. USV, March 13, 1865	July 26, 1866	
Bangs, Isaac Sparrow	Colonel	81st Regiment U.S. Colored Infantry	Bvt. Brig. Gen. USV, March 13, 1865	July 23, 1866; February 21, 1867	Brevet for Battle of Port Hudson, Louisiana.
Bankhead, Henry Cary	Lt. Colonel	Asst. Inspector Gen. USV	Bvt. Brig. Gen. USV, April 1, 1865	April 9, 1869	Brevet for Battle of Five Forks, Virginia.
Banning, Henry B.	Colonel; Colonel	121st Regiment Ohio Volunteer Infantry; 195th Regiment Ohio Volunteer Infantry	Bvt. Brig. Gen. USV, March 13, 1865; Bvt. Maj. Gen. USV, March 13, 1865	March 12, 1866; April 26, 1866	U.S. House of Representatives, 1873–1879.
Barber, Gershom Morse	Captain; Lt. Colonel	1st Battalion Ohio Sharpshooters; 197th Regiment Ohio Volunteer Infantry	Bvt. Brig. Gen. USV, March 13, 1865	April 10, 1866	
Barnes, Charles	Colonel	6th Regiment Pennsylvania Volunteer Heavy Artillery	Bvt. Brig. Gen. USV, September 28, 1865	March 12, 1866	
Barnes, Joseph Henry	Colonel	29th Regiment Massachusetts Volunteer Infantry	Bvt. Brig. Gen. USV, August 19, 1864	August 19, 1864	Brevet for the Battle of Globe Tavern
Barnett, James	Colonel	1st Regiment Ohio Volunteer Light Artillery	Bvt. Brig. Gen. USV, March 13, 1865	March 12, 1866	
Barney, Albert Milton	Colonel	142nd Regiment New York Volunteer Infantry	Bvt. Brig. Gen. USV, March 11, 1865	March 12, 1866	
Barney, Benjamin Griffin	Lt. Colonel	2nd Provisional Regiment Pennsylvania; Volunteer Heavy Artillery	Bvt. Brig. Gen. USV, March 13, 1865	July 19, 1867	Brevet for Petersburg campaign.
Barney, Lewis Tappan	Captain	Asst. Adjutant Gen. USV	Bvt. Brig. Gen. USV, March 13, 1865; Bvt. Maj. Gen. USV, March 13, 1865	February 14, 1868; February 14, 1868	Youngest brevet brigadier general. Born March 18, 1844.
Barrett, Theodore Harvey	Colonel	62nd Regiment U.S. Colored Infantry	Bvt. Brig. Gen. USV, March 13, 1865	April 10, 1866	Also confirmed April 26, 1866, likely correction.
Barrett, Wallace W.	Colonel	44th Regiment Illinois Volunteer Infantry	Bvt. Brig. Gen. USV, March 13, 1865	March 12, 1866	
Barriger, John Walker	Lt. Colonel	Commissary Gen. of Subsistence Dept., USV	Bvt. Brig. Gen. USA, March 13, 1865	July 17, 1868	USMA, 1856. Retired Col. U.S. Army, 1896.
Barry, Henry W.	Colonel	8th Regiment U.S. Colored Heavy Artillery	Bvt. Brig. Gen. USV, March 13, 1865; Bvt. Maj. Gen. USV, March 13, 1865	July 25, 1866; March 2, 1867	U.S. House of Representatives, 1860–1875.
Barstow, Simon Forrester	Major	Asst. Adjutant Gen. USV	Bvt. Brig. Gen. USV, March 13, 1865	April 10, 1866	
Barstow, Wilson	Captain	Additional Aide-de-Camp, USV	Bvt. Brig. Gen. USV, March 13, 1865	February 6, 1867	
Bartholomew, Orion A.	Colonel	109th Regiment U.S. Colored Infantry	Bvt. Brig. Gen. USV, March 13, 1865	April 10, 1866	
Bartlett, Charles Gratiot	Colonel	119th Regiment U.S. Colored Infantry	Bvt. Brig. Gen. USV, March 13, 1865	April 10, 1866	
Bartlett, William Chambers	Colonel	2nd Mounted Regiment North Carolina Volunteer Infantry	Bvt. Brig. Gen. USV, March 13, 1865	March 12, 1866	USMA, 1862
Barton, William Brainerd	Colonel	48th Regiment New York Volunteer Infantry	Bvt. Brig. Gen. USV, March 13, 1865	July 19, 1867	For Fort Wagner, South Carolina, July 18, 1863.
Bassett, Isaac C.	Colonel	82nd Regiment Pennsylvania Volunteer Infantry	Bvt. Brig. Gen. USV, December 12, 1864	February 14, 1865	Mexican–American War veteran. Brevet for Overland Campaign.
Batchelder, Richard Napoleon	Colonel	Quartermaster Dept., USV	Bvt. Brig. Gen. USV, March 13, 1865; Bvt. Brig. Gen. USA, April 9, 1865	March 3, 1869	Medal of Honor for Battle of Fairfax Station, Virginia, October 13–15, 1863. Brigadier general, USA, and quartermaster general, June 26, 1890–July 27, 1896.
Bates, Delavan	Colonel	30th Regiment U.S. Colored Infantry	Bvt. Brig. Gen. USV, July 30, 1864	February 20, 1865	Medal of Honor for Cemetery Hill, Petersburg, Virginia, July 30, 1864.
Bates, Erastus Newton	Lt. Colonel	80th Regiment Illinois Volunteer Infantry	Bvt. Brig. Gen. USV, March 13, 1865	July 19, 1867	
Bates, James Lawrence	Colonel	12th Regiment Massachusetts Volunteer Infantry	Bvt. Brig. Gen. USV, March 13, 1865	March 3, 1869	Brevet award confirmed but not issued.
Baxter, De Witt Clinton	Colonel	72nd Regiment Pennsylvania Volunteer Infantry	Bvt. Brig. Gen. USV, March 13, 1865	March 3, 1869	Brevet for bravery at Battles of Gettysburg, and the Wilderness.
Beadle, William Henry H.	Major	3rd Regiment Veteran Reserve Corps	Bvt. Brig. Gen. USV, March 13, 1865	May 18, 1866	
Beaver, James Addams	Colonel	148th Regiment Pennsylvania Volunteer Infantry	Bvt. Brig. Gen. USV, August 1, 1864	February 20, 1865	Lost right leg at Ream's Station, Virginia, August 25, 1864. Brevet for Battle of Cold Harbor, Virginia.
Beazell, James W.	Major	Additional Paymaster, USV	Bvt. Brig. Gen. USV, August 23, 1865	March 3, 1869	
Beckwith, Amos	Colonel	Additional Aide-de-Camp, USV	Bvt. Brig. Gen. USV, January 12, 1865; Bvt. Brig. Gen. USA, March 13, 1865; Bvt. Maj. Gen. USA, March 13, 1865	February 14, 1865; May 4, 1866; March 2, 1867	USMA, 1850. Brevet for 1865 Carolinas campaign. Retired as Colonel, U.S. Army, 1889.
Beckwith, Edward Griffin	Colonel	Additional Aide-de-Camp, USV	Bvt. Brig. Gen. USA, March 13, 1865	July 25, 1866	USMA, 1842. Mexican–American War veteran. Retired as Major, U.S. Army, 1879.
Bedel, John	Colonel	3rd Regiment New Hampshire Volunteer Infantry	Bvt. Brig. Gen. USV, March 13, 1865	March 12, 1866	Mexican–American War veteran.
Beecher, James Chaplin	Colonel	35th Regiment U.S. Colored Infantry	Bvt. Brig. Gen. USV, March 13, 1865	March 12, 1866	Brother of Rev. Henry Ward Beecher.
Bell, George	Lt. Colonel	Commissary Gen. of Subsistence Dept., USA	Bvt. Brig. Gen. USA, April 9, 1865	February 14, 1868	USMA, 1853. Retired as Regular Army colonel, 1892.
Bell, John Hann	Lt. Colonel	12th Regiment Veteran Reserve Corps	Bvt. Brig. Gen. USV, November 30, 1865	March 12, 1866	
Bell, Joseph Warren	Colonel	13th Regiment Illinois Volunteer Cavalry	Bvt. Brig. Gen. USV, March 13, 1865	July 19, 1867	
Bendix, John E.	Colonel; Colonel	7th Regiment New York Volunteer Infantry; 10th Regiment New York Volunteer Infantry	Bvt. Brig. Gen. USV, March 13, 1865	July 26, 1866	
Benedict, Lewis	Colonel; Colonel	73rd Regiment New York Volunteer Infantry; 162nd Regiment New York Volunteer Infantry	Bvt. Brig. Gen. USV, March 13, 1865	July 23, 1866	Brevet for Battle of Port Hudson, Louisiana. Killed at Battle of Pleasant Hill, Louisiana, April 9, 1864.
Benjamin, William Henry	Lt. Colonel	8th Regiment New York Volunteer Cavalry	Bvt. Brig. Gen. USV, March 13, 1865	July 23, 1866	
Bennett, John E.	Colonel	75th Regiment Illinois Volunteer Infantry	Bvt. Brig. Gen. USV, April 6, 1865	March 12, 1866	Arkansas Supreme Court, 1871–1874. South Dakota Supreme Court, 1889–1893
Bennett, Thomas W.	Colonel	69th Regiment Indiana Volunteer Infantry	Bvt. Brig. Gen. USV, March 5, 1865	March 10, 1865	Governor of Idaho Territory, 1871–1875. U.S. House of Representatives, 1875–1876.
Bennett, William True	Colonel	33rd Regiment U.S. Colored Infantry	Bvt. Brig. Gen. USV, May 25, 1865	March 12, 1866	Brevet for Battle of Honey Hill, South Carolina.
Bentley, Richard Charles	Lt. Colonel	63rd Regiment New York Volunteer Infantry	Bvt. Brig. Gen. USV, March 13, 1865	July 19, 1867	
Bentley, Robert Henry	Lt. Colonel	12th Regiment Ohio Volunteer Cavalry	Bvt. Brig. Gen. USV, March 13, 1865	February 6, 1867	
Benton, Thomas Hart Jr.	Colonel	29th Regiment Iowa Volunteer Infantry	Bvt. Brig. Gen. USV, December 15, 1864	February 14, 1865	Nephew of U.S. Senator Thomas Hart Benton.
Berdan, Hiram	Colonel	1st Regiment U.S. Sharpshooters	Bvt. Brig. Gen. USV, March 13, 1865; Bvt. Maj. Gen. USV, March 13, 1865	February 16, 1869 not confirmed	Brevet for Battle of Chancellorsville, Virginia.
Bertram, Henry	Colonel	20th Regiment Wisconsin Volunteer Infantry	Bvt. Brig. Gen. USV, March 13, 1865	March 12, 1866	Mexican–American War veteran under name Henry Beeger.
Beveridge, John Lourie	Colonel	17th Regiment Illinois Volunteer Cavalry	Bvt. Brig. Gen. USV, March 7, 1865	March 10, 1865	U.S. House of Representatives, 1871–1873. Governor of Illinois, 1873–1877.
Biddle, James	Colonel	6th Regiment Indiana Volunteer Cavalry	Bvt Brig. Gen. USV, March 13, 1865; Bvt. Brig. Gen. USA, March 13, 1865	March 12, 1866; March 3, 1869	Retired as Regular Army colonel, 1896.
Biggs, Herman	Colonel	Quartermaster Dept., USV	Bvt. Brig. Gen. USV, March 8, 1865	March 10, 1865	USMA, 1856.
Biggs, Jonathan	Lt. Colonel	123rd Regiment Illinois Volunteer Infantry	Bvt. Brig. Gen. USV, March 13, 1865	March 12, 1866	
Biles, Edwin Ruthwin	Colonel	99th Regiment Pennsylvania Volunteer Infantry	Bvt. Brig. Gen. USV, March 13, 1865	February 6, 1867	Mexican–American War veteran. Brevet for Battle of Deep Bottom, Virginia.
Bingham, Henry Harrison	Major	Judge-Advocate, USV	Bvt. Brig. Gen. USV, April 9, 1865; Bvt. Brig. Gen. USA, April 9, 1865	February 13, 1868; July 23, 1866	Medal of Honor for Battle of the Wilderness. U.S. House of Representatives, 1879–1912.
Bingham, Judson David	Colonel	Asst. Quartermaster, USA	Bvt. Brig. Gen. USA, April 9, 1865	July 23, 1866	USMA, 1854. Retired as Regular Army colonel, 1895.
Bintliff, James	Colonel	38th Regiment Wisconsin Volunteer Infantry	Bvt. Brig. Gen. USV, April 2, 1865	March 12, 1866	Brevet for assault on Petersburg.
Bishop, Judson Wade	Colonel	2nd Regiment Minnesota Volunteer Infantry	Bvt. Brig. Gen. USV, June 7, 1865	March 12, 1866	Brevet for assault at Battle of Fort Blakeley, Alabama.
Black, John Charles	Colonel	37th Regiment Illinois Volunteer Infantry	Bvt. Brig. Gen. USV, April 9, 1865	March 12, 1866	Medal of Honor for Battle of Prairie Grove, Arkansas, December 7, 1862. U.S. House of Representatives, 1893–1895.
Blackman, Albert Milton	Colonel	27th Regiment U.S. Colored Infantry	Bvt. Brig. Gen. USV, October 27, 1864	February 14, 1865	Brevet for Battle of Hatcher's Run, Virginia.
Blair, Charles White	Colonel	14th Regiment Kansas Volunteer Cavalry	Bvt. Brig. Gen. USV, February 13, 1865	February 23, 1865	
Blair, Lewis Jackson	Major	88th Regiment Indiana Volunteer Infantry	Bvt. Brig. Gen. USV, February 13, 1865	March 12, 1866	
Blair, William H.	Colonel	179th Regiment Pennsylvania Volunteer Infantry	Bvt. Brig. Gen. USV, March 13, 1865	July 23, 1866	Brevet for taking Burnside's Bridge at Battle of Antietam.
Blaisdell, William	Colonel	11th Regiment Massachusetts Volunteer Infantry	Bvt. Brig. Gen. USV, June 23, 1864	July 2, 1865	Mexican–American War veteran. Killed at Siege of Petersburg, June 23, 1864.
Blake, George Alexander Hamilton	Colonel	1st Regiment U.S. Cavalry	Bvt. Brig. Gen. USA, March 13, 1865; Bvt. Maj. Gen. USA, March 13, 1865	February 23, 1867; March 3, 1869	Mexican–American War veteran. Retired as Regular Army colonel, 1870.
Blakeslee, Erastus	Colonel	1st Regiment Connecticut Volunteer Cavalry	Bvt. Brig. Gen. USV, March 13, 1865	March 12, 1868	Brevet for Ashland, Virginia, June 1, 1864.
Blanchard, Justus Wardwell	Colonel	162nd Regiment New York Volunteer Infantry	Bvt. Brig. Gen. USV, March 13, 1865	March 12, 1866	
Blanden, Leander	Colonel	95th Regiment Illinois Volunteer Infantry	Bvt. Brig. Gen. USV, March 26, 1865	March 12, 1866	Brevet for Battle of Mobile, Alabama.
Bloomfield, Ira Jackson	Lt. Colonel	26th Regiment Illinois Volunteer Infantry	Bvt. Brig. Gen. USV, March 13, 1865	April 10, 1866	
Blunt, Asa Peabody	Captain	Asst. Quartermaster, USV	Bvt. Brig. Gen. USV, March 13, 1865	May 18, 1866	Died as Regular Army major, 1889.
Bodine, Robert Lewis	Lt. Colonel	26th Regiment Pennsylvania Volunteer Infantry	Bvt. Brig. Gen. USV, March 13, 1865	July 26, 1866	
Bolinger, Henry Clay	Colonel	7th Regiment Reserves Pennsylvania Volunteer Infantry	Bvt. Brig. Gen. USV, March 13, 1865	July 27, 1866	Brevet for Battle of the Wilderness.
Bolles, John Augustus	Major	Additional Aide-de-Camp, USV	Bvt. Brig. Gen. USV, July 17, 1865	April 10, 1866	
Bolton, William Jordan	Colonel	51st Regiment Pennsylvania Volunteer Infantry	Bvt. Brig. Gen. USV, March 13, 1865	March 12, 1866	
Bomford, James Voty	Colonel	8th Regiment U.S. Infantry	Bvt. Brig. Gen. USA, March 13, 1865	July 23, 1868	USMA, 1832. Mexican–American war veteran. Retired as Regular Army colonel, 1874.
Bond, John Randolph	Colonel	111th Regiment Ohio Volunteer Infantry	Bvt. Brig. Gen. USV, March 13, 1865	July 23, 1866	
Bonham, Edward	Lt. Colonel	47th Regiment Illinois Volunteer Infantry	Bvt. Brig. Gen. USV, March 13, 1865	April 10, 1866	
Bonneville, Benjamin L. E.	Colonel	3rd Regiment U.S. Infantry; Chief Commissary of Musters; Department of Missouri	Bvt. Brig. Gen. USA, March 13, 1865	July 26, 1866	USMA, 1815. Mexican–American War veteran. Rocky Mountains explorer. Retired as Regular Army colonel, 1861.
Bootes, Levi Clark	Major	17th Regiment U.S. Infantry	Bvt. Brig. Gen. USA, March 13, 1865	March 3, 1869	Mexican–American War veteran. Retired as Regular Army lieutenant colonel, 1874.
Boughton, Horace	Colonel	143rd Regiment New York Volunteer Infantry	Bvt. Brig. Gen. USV, March 13, 1865	March 12, 1866	
Bouton, Edward	Colonel	59th Regiment U.S. Colored Infantry	Bvt. Brig. Gen. USV, February 28, 1865	March 9, 1865	
Bowen, Thomas Mead	Colonel	13th Regiment Kansas Volunteer Infantry	Bvt. Brig. Gen. USV, February 13, 1865	February 23, 1865	Appointed by President Lincoln. Arkansas Supreme Court, 1867–1871. Governor of Idaho Territory, 1871. U.S. Senator, 1883–1889.
Bowerman, Richard Neville	Colonel	4th Regiment Maryland Volunteer Infantry	Bvt. Brig. Gen. USV, April 1, 1865	March 2, 1867	Brevet for Battle of Five Forks, Virginia.
Bowers, Theodore S.	Lt. Colonel	Asst. Adjutant Gen. USA	Bvt. Brig. Gen. USA, April 9, 1865	July 23, 1866	Staff of Lt. Gen. Ulysses S. Grant.
Bowie, George Washington	Colonel	5th Regiment California Volunteer Infantry	Bvt. Brig. Gen. USV, March 13, 1865	July 27, 1866	Mexican–American War veteran.
Bowman, Samuel M.	Colonel	84th Regiment Pennsylvania Volunteer Infantry	Bvt. Brig. Gen. USV, March 13, 1865; Bvt. Maj. Gen. USV, March 13, 1865	March 2, 1867; March 3, 1869	
Bowyer, Eli	Colonel	11th Regiment Missouri Volunteer Infantry	Bvt. Brig. Gen. USV, March 13, 1865	Record unclear.	
Boyd, Joseph Fulton	Lt. Colonel	Quartermaster Dept., USV	Bvt. Brig. Gen. USV, March 13, 1865	March 12, 1866	
Boynton, Henry	Colonel	8th Regiment Maine Volunteer Infantry	Bvt. Brig. Gen. USV, March 13, 1865	July 23, 1866	
Boynton, Henry Van Ness	Lt. Colonel	35th Regiment Ohio Volunteer Infantry	Bvt. Brig. Gen. USV, March 13, 1865	April 10, 1866	Medal of Honor for Battle of Missionary Ridge. Brevet for Battles of Chickamauga, Missionary Ridge.
Bradshaw, Robert Charles	Colonel	44th Regiment Missouri Volunteer Infantry	Bvt. Brig. Gen. USV, March 13, 1865	April 10, 1866	
Brady, Thomas Jefferson	Colonel; Colonel	117th Regiment Indiana Volunteer Infantry; 140th Regiment Indiana Volunteer Infantry	Bvt. Brig. Gen. USV, March 13, 1865	May 18, 1866	
Brailey, Moses Randolph	Lt. Colonel	111th Regiment Ohio Volunteer Infantry	Bvt. Brig. Gen. USV, March 13, 1865	July 19, 1867	Brevet For Battle of Mill Springs, Kentucky.
Brayton, Charles Ray	Colonel	3rd Regiment Rhode Island Volunteer Heavy Artillery	Bvt. Brig. Gen. USV, March 13, 1865	March 2, 1867	
Breck, Samuel	Major	Asst. Adjutant Gen. USA	Bvt. Brig. Gen. USA, March 13, 1865	May 4, 1866	USMA, 1855. Retired as Regular Army brigadier general, adjutant general, 1898.
Brewerton, Henry	Colonel	Corps of Engineers, USA	Bvt. Brig. Gen. USA, March 13, 1865	February 23, 1867	
Brewster, William R.	Colonel	73rd Regiment New York Volunteer Infantry	Bvt. Brig. Gen. USV, December 2, 1864	February 14, 1865	Brevet for Overland Campaign.
Brice, Benjamin William	Colonel	Paymaster General, USA	Bvt. Brig. Gen. USA, December 2, 1864; Bvt. Maj. Gen. USA, March 13, 1865	February 20, 1865; May 4, 1866; July 14, 1866	Bvt. Brig. Gen. nomination by Pres. Lincoln, December 12, 1864. Mexican–American War veteran. Retired as Regular Army brigadier general and paymaster general, 1872.
Brinkerhoff, Roeliff	Colonel	Quartermaster Dept., USV	Bvt. Brig. Gen. USV, September 20, 1866	February 6, 1867	
Briscoe, James C.	Colonel; Colonel	199th Regiment Pennsylvania Volunteer Infantry; 188th Regiment Pennsylvania Volunteer Infantry	Bvt. Brig. Gen. USV, March 13, 1865	Not nominated	Brevet for Battle of Fort Gregg. Dismissed for stealing U.S. funds.
Britt, James W.	Lt. Colonel	57th New York Volunteer Infantry	Bvt. Brig. Gen. USV, March 13, 1865	March 3, 1869	
Brodhead, Thornton F.	Colonel	1st Regiment Michigan Volunteer Cavalry	Bvt. Brig. Gen. USV, August 30, 1862	March 28, 1867	Mexican–American War veteran. Mortally wounded at Battle of Second Bull Run. Posthumous award.
Bronson, Stephen	Colonel; Colonel	141st Regiment Illinois Volunteer Infantry; 153rd Regiment Illinois Volunteer Infantry	Bvt. Brig. Gen. USV, September 28, 1865	March 12, 1866	
Brooks, Horace	Colonel	4th Regiment U.S. Artillery	Bvt. Brig. Gen. USA, March 13, 1865; Bvt. Maj. Gen. USA, March 13, 1865	July 25, 1866; March 3, 1869	USMA, 1835. Mexican–American War veteran. Retired as Regular Army colonel, 1877
Brown, Charles Elwood	Major	63rd Regiment Ohio Volunteer Infantry	Bvt. Brig. Gen. USV, March 13, 1865	March 12, 1866	Lost left leg at, brevet for Battle of Atlanta. U.S. House of Representatives, 1885–1889.
Brown, Harvey	Colonel	5th Regiment U.S. Artillery	Bvt. Brig. Gen. USA, November 23, 1861; Bvt. Maj. Gen. USA, August 2, 1866	May 12, 1862; February 23, 1867; March 2, 1867	USMA, 1818. Mexican–American war veteran. Nominated brig. gen. by Pres. Lincoln, April 25, 1862 for Battle of Fort Pickens, November 1861. Bvt. maj. gen. for suppression of New York City riot, 1863. Retired as Regular Army colonel, 1863.
Brown, Hiram Loomis	Colonel	145th Regiment Pennsylvania Volunteer Infantry	Bvt. Brig. Gen. USV, September 3, 1864	February 20, 1865	
Brown, John Marshall	Lt. Colonel	32nd Regiment Maine Volunteer Infantry	Bvt. Brig. Gen. USV, March 13, 1865	February 3, 1867	
Brown, Lewis Gove	Colonel	117th Regiment U.S. Colored Infantry	Bvt. Brig. Gen. USV, March 13, 1865	April 26, 1866	
Brown, Nathan Williams	Colonel	Asst. Paymaster General, USA	Bvt. Brig. Gen. USA, October 15, 1867	February 14, 1868	Retired as Regular Army brigadier general, paymaster general, 1882.
Brown, Orlando	Colonel	24th Regiment U.S. Colored Infantry	Bvt. Brig. Gen. USV, January 6, 1866	April 10, 1866	
Brown, Philip Perry Jr.	Colonel; Colonel	157th Regiment New York Volunteer Infantry; 7th U.S. Veteran Volunteer Infantry	Bvt. Brig. Gen. USV, March 13, 1865	April 10, 1866	
Brown, Samuel Lockwood	Colonel	Quartermaster Dept., USV	Bvt. Brig. Gen. USV, March 13, 1865	March 12, 1866	
Brown, Simeon Batcheldor	Colonel	11th Regiment Michigan Volunteer Cavalry	Bvt. Brig. Gen. USV, March 13, 1865	February 20, 1865	
Brown, Theodore Frelinghuysen	Captain	51st Regiment Illinois Volunteer Infantry	Bvt. Brig. Gen. USV, March 13, 1865	July 27, 1866	Brevet for Battle of Kennesaw Mountain, Georgia.
Brown, William Rufus	Colonel	13th Regiment West Virginia Volunteer Infantry	Bvt. Brig. Gen. USV, March 13, 1865	March 2, 1867	
Browne, Thomas McLelland	Colonel	7th Regiment Indiana Volunteer Cavalry	Bvt. Brig. Gen. USV, March 13, 1865	April 10, 1866; April 26, 1866	U.S. House of Representatives, 1877–1891.
Browne, William Henry	Colonel; Colonel	31st Regiment New York Volunteer Infantry; 24th Regiment Veteran Reserve Corps	Bvt. Brig. Gen. USV, March 13, 1865	March 12, 1866	Mexican–American War veteran.
Brownlow, James Patton	Colonel	1st Regiment Tennessee Volunteer Cavalry	Bvt. Brig. Gen. USV, March 13, 1865	March 12, 1866	Son of Editor, Governor of Tennessee, and U.S. Senator "Parson" William G. Brownlow.
Bruce, John	Lt. Colonel	19th Regiment Iowa Volunteer Infantry	Bvt. Brig. Gen. USV, March 13, 1865	July 26, 1866	U.S. District Judge.
Brumback, Jefferson	Lt. Colonel	95th Regiment Ohio Volunteer Infantry	Bvt. Brig. Gen. USV, March 13, 1865	March 2, 1867	
Brush, Daniel Harmon	Colonel	18th Regiment Illinois Volunteer Infantry	Bvt. Brig. Gen. USV, March 13, 1865	April 10, 1866	Brevet for Battle of Fort Donelson and Battle of Shiloh.
Buchanan, Robert Christie	Colonel; Brig. Gen. USV, November 29, 1862 temporary	1st Regiment U.S. Infantry	Bvt. Brig. Gen. USA, March 13, 1865; Bvt. Maj. Gen. USA, March 13, 1865	May 4, 1866; July 23, 1866	USMA, 1830. Brig. gen. appt. expired March 4, 1863. Bvt. Brig. Gen. for Malvern Hill. Bvt. Maj. Gen. for First Bull Run, Fredericksburg. Retired Colonel, USA, December 31, 1870.
Buell, George Pearson	Colonel	58th Regiment Indiana Volunteer Infantry	Bvt. Brig. Gen. USV, January 12, 1865; Bvt. Brig. Gen., USA, March 2, 1867	February 14, 1865; February 14, 1868	Norwich University, 1856. Died as Regular Army colonel, May 31, 1883. First cousin of Maj. Gen. Don Carlos Buell
Bukey, Van Hartness	Colonel	11th Regiment West Virginia Volunteer Infantry	Bvt. Brig. Gen. USV, March 13, 1865	April 10, 1866	
Burbank, Sidney	Colonel	2nd Regiment U.S. Infantry	Bvt. Brig. Gen. USA, March 13, 1865	May 4, 1866	USMA, 1829. Brevet for Battle of Gettysburg. Retired as Regular Army colonel, 1870.
Burke, Joseph Walter	Colonel	10th Regiment Ohio Volunteer Infantry	Bvt. Brig. Gen. USV, March 13, 1865	February 6, 1867	
Burke, Martin	Lt. Colonel	3rd Regiment U.S. Artillery	Bvt. Brig. Gen. USA, March 13, 1865	May 4, 1866	Mexican–American War veteran. Retired as Regular Army lieutenant colonel, 1863.
Burling, George Childs	Colonel	6th Regiment New Jersey Volunteer Infantry	Bvt. Brig. Gen. USV, March 13, 1865	February 14, 1868	Brevet for Battle of Gettysburg.
Burnett, Henry Lawrence	Major	Judge-Advocate, USV	Bvt. Brig. Gen. USV, March 13, 1865	March 12, 1866	Asst. Judge Advocate, Lincoln conspiracy trial.
Burton, Henry Stanton	Colonel	5th Regiment U.S. Artillery	Bvt. Brig. Gen. USA, March 13, 1865	July 25, 1866	USMA, 1839. Mexican–American War veteran. Commander Fort Delaware prisoner of war camp. Died as Regular Army colonel, 1869.
Busey, Samuel Thompson	Colonel	76th Regiment Illinois Volunteer Infantry	Bvt. Brig. Gen. USV, April 9, 1865	July 26, 1866	Brevet for Battle of Fort Blakeley, Alabama. U.S. House of Representatives, 1891–1893
Butler, Thomas Harvey	Colonel	5th Regiment Indiana Volunteer Cavalry	Bvt. Brig. Gen. USV, March 13, 1865	March 12, 1866	Brevet for campaigns of 1863 and 1864.
Byrne, James J.	Colonel	18th Regiment New York Volunteer Cavalry	Bvt. Brig. Gen. USV, March 13, 1865; Bvt. Maj. Gen. USV, March 13, 1865	February 23, 1867; March 2, 1867	Brevet for Battle of Pleasant Hill and Campti, Louisiana. Further brevet for Battle of Moore's Plantation, Battle of Yellow Bayou. Post Civil War US Marshal North District of Texas; Died of wounds August 13, 1880 after being attacked by Apache Indians under Victorio

== Union brevet generals; lower actual, substantive grade ==
=== C ===
Name	Highest actual grade	Unit	Brevet grade, rank date	Date confirmed	Notes, other dates
Cady, Albemarle	Colonel	8th Regiment U.S. Infantry	Bvt. Brig. Gen. USA, March 13, 1865	July 26, 1866	
Callender, Franklin Dyer	Major	Ordnance Dept., USA	Bvt. Brig. Gen. USA, April 9, 1865	July 25, 1866	
Callis, John Benton	Lt. Colonel	7th Regiment Veteran Reserve Corps	Bvt. Brig. Gen. USV, March 13, 1865	March 13, 1867	
Cameron, Daniel	Colonel	65th Regiment Illinois Volunteer Infantry; A commander of Camp Douglas military prisoner of war camp	Bvt. Brig. Gen. USV, March 13, 1865	February 21, 1867	
Cameron, Hugh	Lt. Colonel	2nd Regiment Arkansas Volunteer Cavalry	Bvt. Brig. Gen. USV, March 13, 1865	March 12, 1867	
Campbell, Cleaveland John	Colonel	23rd Regiment U.S. Colored Infantry	Bvt. Brig. Gen. USV, March 13, 1865	March 12, 1866	
Campbell, Edward Livingston	Lt. Colonel	4th Regiment New Jersey Volunteer Infantry	Bvt. Brig. Gen. USV, April 9, 1865	March 12, 1866	
Campbell, Jacob Miller	Colonel	54th Regiment Pennsylvania Volunteer Infantry	Bvt. Brig. Gen. USV, March 13, 1865	March 2, 1867	
Campbell, John Allen	Lt. Colonel	Asst. Adjutant Gen. USV	Bvt. Brig. Gen. USV, March 13, 1865	April 10, 1867	
Candy, Charles	Colonel	66th Regiment Ohio Volunteer Infantry	Bvt. Brig. Gen. USV, March 13, 1865	March 2, 1867	
Capehart, Henry	Colonel	1st Regiment West Virginia Cavalry Volunteers	Bvt. Brig. Gen. USV, March 13, 1865; Bvt. Maj. Gen. USV, June 17, 1865	March 12, 1866; March 12, 1866	Medal of Honor
Capron, Horace	Colonel	14th Regiment Illinois Volunteer Cavalry	Bvt. Brig. Gen. USV, March 13, 1865	March 12. 1866	
Card, Benjamin Cozzens	Colonel	Asst. Quartermaster, USA	Bvt. Brig. Gen. USA, March 13, 1865	May 4, 1866	
Carle, James	Colonel	191st Regiment Pennsylvania Volunteer Infantry	Bvt. Brig. Gen. USV, March 13, 1865	March 12, 1866	
Carleton, Charles Arms	Major	Asst. Adjutant Gen. USV	Bvt. Brig. Gen. USV, March 13, 1865	February 16, 1869	
Carman, Ezra Ayers	Colonel	13th Regiment New Jersey Volunteer Infantry	Bvt. Brig. Gen. USV, March 13, 1865	March 12, 1866	
Carnahan, Robert Huston	Colonel	3rd Regiment Illinois Volunteer Cavalry	Bvt. Brig. Gen. USV, October 28, 1865	March 12, 1866	
Carruth, Sumner	Colonel	35th Regiment Massachusetts Volunteer Infantry	Bvt. Brig. Gen. USV, April 2, 1865	March 12, 1866	
Carson, Christopher	Colonel	1st Regiment New Mexico Volunteer Infantry	Bvt. Brig. Gen. USV, March 13, 1865	March 12, 1866	Mexican–American War veteran; For Battle of Valverde
Case, Henry	Colonel	129th Regiment Illinois Volunteer Infantry	Bvt. Brig. Gen. USV, March 16, 1865	March 12, 1866	
Casement, John Stephen	Colonel	103rd Regiment Ohio Volunteer Infantry	Bvt. Brig. Gen. USV, January 25, 1865	February 14, 1865	
Cassidy, Ambrose Spencer	Major	93rd Regiment New York Volunteer Infantry	Bvt. Brig. Gen. USV, March 13, 1865	February 14, 1868	
Catlin, Isaac Swartword	Colonel	109th Regiment New York Volunteer Infantry	Bvt. Brig. Gen. USV, March 13, 1865; Bvt. Maj. Gen. USV, March 13, 1865	March 12, 1866; March 28, 1867	Medal of Honor
Cavender, John Smith	Colonel	29th Regiment Missouri Volunteer Infantry	Bvt. Brig. Gen. USV, March 13, 1865	July 19, 1867	
Chamberlain, Samuel Emery	Lt. Colonel	1st Regiment Massachusetts Volunteer Cavalry	Bvt. Brig. Gen. USV, February 24, 1865	March 3, 1865	
Chambers, Alexander	Colonel	16th Regiment Iowa Volunteer Infantry	Bvt. Brig. Gen. USV, March 13, 1865	February 16, 1869	
Champion, Thomas Emmet	Colonel	96th Regiment Illinois Volunteer Infantry	Bvt. Brig. Gen. USV, February 20, 1865	March 10, 1865	
Chaplin, Daniel	Colonel	1st Regiment, Maine Volunteer Heavy Artillery	Bvt. Brig. Gen. USV, August 17, 1864; Bvt. Maj. Gen. USV, August 17, 1864	April 5, 1867; April 5, 1867	
Chickering, Thomas Edward	Colonel	3rd Regiment Massachusetts Volunteer Cavalry	Bvt. Brig. Gen. USV, March 13, 1865	April 10, 1866	
Chipman, Henry Laurens	Colonel	102nd Regiment U.S. Colored Infantry	Bvt. Brig. Gen. USV, March 13, 1865	March 12, 1866	
Chipman, Norton Parker	Colonel	Additional Aide-de-Camp, USV	Bvt. Brig. Gen. USV, March 13, 1865	March 12, 1866	
Christ, Benjamin C.	Colonel	50th Regiment Pennsylvania Volunteer Infantry	Bvt. Brig. Gen. USV, August 1, 1864	February 20, 1865	
Christensen, Christian Thomsen	Lt. Colonel	Asst. Adjutant Gen. USV	Bvt. Brig. Gen. USV, March 13, 1865	March 12, 1866	
Christian, William Henry	Colonel	26th Regiment New York Volunteer Infantry	Bvt. Brig. Gen. USV, March 13, 1865	February 16, 1869	
Churchill, Mendal	Lt. Colonel	27th Regiment Ohio Volunteer Infantry	Bvt. Brig. Gen. USV, March 13, 1865	April 10, 1866	
Churchill, Sylvester	Colonel	Inspector General, U.S. Army (1841–1861)	Bvt. Brig. General, USA (September 23, 1847)		Retired September 25, 1861
Cilley, Jonathan Prince	Lt. Colonel	1st Regiment Maine Volunteer Cavalry	Bvt. Brig. Gen. USV, June 12, 1865	March 12, 1866	
Cist, Henry Martyn	Major	Asst. Adjutant Gen. USV	Bvt. Brig. Gen. USV, March 13, 1865	February 6, 1867	
Clapp, Dexter E.	Lt. Colonel	38th Regiment U.S. Colored Infantry	Bvt. Brig. Gen. USV, March 13, 1865	May 18, 1866	
Clark, George Washington	Colonel	34th Regiment Iowa Volunteer Infantry	Bvt. Brig. Gen. USV, March 13, 1865	March 12, 1866	
Clark, Gideon	Lt. Colonel	119th Regiment Pennsylvania Volunteer Infantry	Bvt. Brig. Gen. USV, March 13, 1865	July 26, 1866	
Clark, John S.	Colonel	Additional Aide-de-Camp, USV	Bvt. Brig. Gen. USV, March 13, 1865	March 12, 1866	
Clark, William Hyde	Major	Asst. Adjutant Gen. USV	Bvt. Brig. Gen. USV, March 13, 1865	March 12, 1867	
Clarke, Henry Francis	Lt. Colonel	Asst. Commissary Gen. of Subsistence, USA	Bvt. Brig. Gen. USA, March 13, 1865; Bvt. Maj. Gen. USA, March 13, 1865	May 4, 1866; March 2, 1867	
Clary, Robert Emmet	Lt. Colonel	Deputy Quartermaster Gen. USA	Bvt. Brig. Gen. USA, March 13, 1865	July 25, 1866	
Clay, Cecil	Lt. Colonel	58th Regiment Pennsylvania Volunteer Infantry	Bvt. Brig. Gen. USV, March 13, 1865	April 10, 1866	Medal of Honor
Clendenin, David Ramsay	Lt. Colonel	8th Regiment Illinois Volunteer Cavalry	Bvt. Brig. Gen. USV, July 11, 1865	March 12, 1866	
Clitz, Henry Boynton	Lt. Colonel	6th Regiment U.S. Infantry	Bvt. Brig. Gen. USA, March 13, 1865	March 2, 1867	Commandant of Cadets at the United States Military Academy,1862–1864
Clough, Joseph Messer	Lt. Colonel	18th Regiment New Hampshire Volunteer Infantry	Bvt. Brig. Gen. USV, March 13, 1865	July 23, 1866	
Coates, Benjamin Franklin	Colonel	91st Regiment Ohio Volunteer Infantry	Bvt. Brig. Gen. USV, March 13, 1865	March 12, 1866	
Coates, James Henry	Colonel	11th Regiment Illinois Volunteer Infantry	Bvt. Brig. Gen. USV, March 13, 1865	March 12, 1866	
Cobb, Amasa	Colonel	43rd Regiment Wisconsin Volunteer Infantry	Bvt. Brig. Gen. USV, March 13, 1865	March 12, 1866	Also confirmed April 10, 1866
Cobham, George Ashworth Jr.	Colonel	111th Regiment Pennsylvania Volunteer Infantry	Bvt. Brig. Gen. USV, July 19, 1864	February 6, 1867	
Coburn, John	Colonel	33rd Regiment Indiana Volunteer Infantry	Bvt. Brig. Gen. USV, March 13, 1865	March 12, 1866	
Cockerill, Joseph Randolph	Colonel	70th Regiment Ohio Volunteer Infantry	Bvt. Brig. Gen. USV, March 13, 1865	March 28, 1867	U. S. House of Representatives 1857-1859
Cogswell, Milton	Colonel	2nd New York Heavy Artillery	Bvt. Brig. Gen. USV, March 13, 1865; Bvt. Brig. Gen. USA, March 13, 1865	March 3, 1869; March 3, 1869	Bvt. USV for Battle of Ball's Bluff; Commander, Fort Columbus, New York Harbor
Cogswell, William	Colonel	2nd Regiment Massachusetts Volunteer Infantry	Bvt. Brig. Gen. USV, December 15, 1864	February 14, 1865	
Coit, James Bolles	Major	14th Regiment Connecticut Volunteer Infantry	Bvt. Brig. Gen. USV, March 13, 1865	February 16, 1869	
Cole, George W.	Colonel	2nd Regiment U.S. Colored Cavalry	Bvt. Brig. Gen. USV, February 25, 1865; Bvt. Maj. Gen. USV, March 13, 1865	March 3, 1865; May 4, 1866	
Colgrove, Silas	Colonel	27th Regiment Indiana Volunteer Infantry	Bvt. Brig. Gen. USV, August 7, 1864	February 20, 1865	
Collier, Frederick H.	Colonel	139th Regiment Pennsylvania Volunteer Infantry	Bvt. Brig. Gen. USV, March 13, 1865	March 12, 1866	
Collis, Charles Henry Tuckey	Colonel	114th Regiment Pennsylvania Volunteer Infantry	Bvt. Brig. Gen. USV, October 28, 1864; Bvt. Maj. Gen. USV, March 13, 1865	February 14, 1865; March 12, 1866	Medal of Honor
Colvill, William Jr.	Colonel	1st Regiment Minnesota Volunteer Infantry	Bvt. Brig. Gen. USV, March 13, 1865	April 10, 1866	
Comly, James Monroe Stuart	Colonel	23rd Regiment Ohio Volunteer Infantry	Bvt. Brig. Gen. USV, March 13, 1865	March 12, 1866	
Commager, Henry Steele (Steal, sic)	Colonel	184th Regiment Ohio Volunteer Infantry	Bvt. Brig. Gen. USV, February 27, 1865	March 10, 1865	
Comstock, Cyrus Ballou	Lt. Colonel	Additional Aide-de-Camp, USV	Bvt. Brig. Gen. USV, January 15, 1865; Bvt. Brig. Gen. USA, March 13, 1865; Bvt. Maj. Gen. USV, March 26, 1865	February 14, 1865; May 4, 1866; March 12, 1866	
Congdon, James A.	Lt. Colonel	12th Regiment Pennsylvania Volunteer Cavalry	Bvt. Brig. Gen. USV, March 13, 1865	April 16, 1867	
Conklin, James Tallmadge	Colonel	Quartermaster Dept., USV	Bvt. Brig. Gen. USV, March 13, 1865	March 12, 1866	
Conrad, Joseph	Colonel	15th Regiment Missouri Volunteer Infantry	Bvt. Brig. Gen. USV, March 13, 1865	March 12, 1866	
Cooke, Edwin Francis	Major	2nd Regiment New York Volunteer Cavalry	Bvt. Brig. Gen. USV, March 13, 1865	April 10, 1866	
Coon, Datus Ensign	Colonel	2nd Regiment Iowa Volunteer Cavalry	Bvt. Brig. Gen. USV, March 8, 1865	March 10, 1865	
Corbin, Henry Clark	Lt. Colonel	14th Regiment U.S. Colored Infantry	Bvt. Brig. Gen. USV, March 13, 1865	April 10, 1866	Retired as Regular Army Lieutenant General, 1906.
Coughlin, John	Lt. Colonel	10th Regiment New Hampshire Volunteer Infantry	Bvt. Brig. Gen. USV, April 9, 1865	March 28, 1867	Medal of Honor
Coulter, Richard	Colonel	11th Regiment Pennsylvania Volunteer Infantry	Bvt. Brig. Gen. USV, August 1, 1864; Bvt. Maj. Gen. USV, April 1, 1865	February 20, 1865; July 23, 1866	
Cowen, Benjamin Rush	Major	Additional Paymaster, USV	Bvt. Brig. Gen. USV, March 13, 1865	March 12, 1866	
Cox, John Cooke	Lt. Colonel	Commissary Gen. of Subsistence Dept., USV	Bvt. Brig. Gen. USV, July 4, 1863	March 2, 1867	
Cox, Robert Courton	Colonel	207th Regiment Pennsylvania Volunteer Infantry	Bvt. Brig. Gen. USV, April 2, 1865	March 12, 1866	
Craig, Henry Knox	Colonel	Ordnance Dept., USA	Bvt. Brig. Gen. USA, March 13, 1865	July 26, 1866	Chief of Ordnance of the U.S. Army, 1851-1861
Cram, George Henry	Colonel	9th Regiment Kentucky Volunteer Infantry	Bvt. Brig. Gen. USV, March 13, 1865	May 18, 1866	
Cram, Thomas Jefferson	Colonel	Additional Aide-de-Camp, USV	Bvt. Brig. Gen. USV, April 2, 1865; Bvt. Brig. Gen. USA, January 13, 1866; Bvt. Maj. Gen. USA, January 13, 1866	May 18, 1866; July 25, 1866; March 18, 1867	
Cramer, Francis L.	Major	1st Regiment Alabama Volunteer Cavalry	Bvt. Brig. Gen. USV, March 13, 1865	April 8, 1867	
Crandal, Frederick Mortimer	Colonel	48th Regiment U.S. Colored Infantry	Bvt. Brig. Gen. USV, October 24, 1865	March 12, 1866	
Crane, Charles Henry	Major	Surgeon, USA	Bvt. Brig. Gen. USA, March 13, 1865	March 12, 1866	Later became Surgeon General of the U.S. Army.
Crane, Nirom M.	Colonel	107th Regiment New York Volunteer Infantry	Bvt. Brig. Gen. USV, March 13, 1865	March 12, 1866	
Cranor, Jonathan	Colonel	40th Regiment Ohio Volunteer Infantry	Bvt. Brig. Gen. USV, March 13, 1865	May 18, 1866	
Crawford, Samuel Johnson	Colonel	83rd Regiment U.S. Colored Infantry	Bvt. Brig. Gen. USV, March 13, 1865	April 10, 1866	
Crocker, John Simpson	Colonel	93rd Regiment New York Volunteer Infantry	Bvt. Brig. Gen. USV, March 13, 1865	April 10, 1866	
Crosman, George Hampton	Colonel	Asst. Quartermaster Gen. USA	Bvt. Brig. Gen. USA, March 13, 1865; Bvt. Maj. Gen. USA, March 13, 1865	July 25, 1866; April 16, 1867	Nominated Bvt. Brig. Gen. but not confirmed, 1863
Cross, Nelson	Colonel	67th Regiment New York Volunteer Infantry	Bvt. Brig. Gen. USV, March 13, 1865; Bvt. Maj. Gen. USV, March 13, 1865	April 10, 1866; July 19, 1867	
Cross, Osborn	Lt. Colonel	Deputy Quartermaster Gen. USA	Bvt. Brig. Gen. USA, March 13, 1865	March 13, 1867	
Crowninshield, Caspar	Colonel	2nd Regiment Massachusetts Volunteer Cavalry	Bvt. Brig. Gen. USV, March 13, 1865	April 10, 1866	
Cumming, Gilbert W.	Colonel	51st Regiment Illinois Volunteer Infantry	Bvt. Brig. Gen. USV, March 13, 1865	March 30, 1867	
Cummings, Alexander	Colonel	19th Regiment Pennsylvania Volunteer Cavalry	Bvt. Brig. Gen. USV, April 19, 1865	March 12, 1866	
Cummins, John E.	Colonel	185th Regiment Ohio Volunteer Infantry	Bvt. Brig. Gen. USV, November 4, 1865	March 12, 1866	
Cunningham, James Adams	Lt. Colonel	32nd Regiment Massachusetts Volunteer Infantry	Bvt. Brig. Gen. USV, April 1, 1865	February 11, 1867	
Curley, Thomas	Colonel	27th Regiment Missouri Volunteer Infantry	Bvt. Brig. Gen. USV, March 13, 1865	March 12, 1866	
Curtin, John Irwin	Colonel	45th Regiment Pennsylvania Volunteer Infantry	Bvt. Brig. Gen. USV, October 12, 1864	February 14, 1865	
Curtis, Arthur Russell	Lt. Colonel	20th Regiment Massachusetts Volunteer Infantry	Bvt. Brig. Gen. USV, March 13, 1865	February 14, 1868	
Curtis, Greely S.	Lt. Colonel	1st Regiment Massachusetts Volunteer Cavalry	Bvt. Brig. Gen. USV, March 13, 1865	March 30, 1867	
Curtis, James Freeman	Colonel	4th Regiment California Volunteer Infantry	Bvt. Brig. Gen. USV, March 13, 1865	April 10, 1867	
Curtis, William Baker	Colonel	12th Regiment West Virginia Volunteer Infantry	Bvt. Brig. Gen. USV, March 13, 1865	March 28, 1867	
Curtiss, James Edward	Lt. Colonel	152nd Regiment New York Volunteer Infantry	Bvt. Brig. Gen. USV, March 13, 1865	April 10, 1867	
Cutcheon, Byron M.	Colonel	27th Regiment Michigan Volunteer Infantry	Bvt. Brig. Gen. USV, March 13, 1865	March 12, 1866	Medal of Honor
Cutting, William	Major	Aide-de-Camp, USV	Bvt. Brig. Gen. USV, March 13, 1865	March 12, 1866	
Cutts, Richard Dominicus	Colonel	Additional Aide-de-Camp, USV	Bvt. Brig. Gen. USV, March 13, 1865	March 12, 1866	
Cuyler, John Meck	Lt. Colonel	Surgeon, USA	Bvt. Brig. Gen. USA, April 9, 1865	March 2, 1867	

== Union brevet generals; lower actual, substantive grade ==
=== D ===
Name	Highest actual grade	Unit	Brevet grade, rank date	Date confirmed	Notes, other dates
Daggett, Aaron Simon	Lt. Colonel	5th Regiment U.S. Veteran Volunteer Infantry	Bvt. Brig. Gen. USV, March 13, 1865	April 10, 1866	Last Brevet General to die
Daggett, Rufus	Colonel	117th Regiment New York Volunteer Infantry	Bvt. Brig. Gen. USV, January 15, 1865	March 3, 1865	
Dana, Edmund Lovell	Colonel	143rd Regiment Pennsylvania Volunteer Infantry	Bvt. Brig. Gen. USV, July 26, 1865	March 12, 1866	
Dana, James Jackson	Colonel	Quartermaster, USA	Bvt. Brig. Gen. USA, March 13, 1865	May 4, 1866	
Dandy, George Brown	Colonel	100th Regiment New York Volunteer Infantry	Bvt. Brig. Gen. USV, March 13, 1865; Bvt. Brig. Gen. USA, March 13, 1865	March 12, 1866; July 23, 1866	
Darr, Francis	Captain	Commissary Gen. of Subsistence Dept., USV	Bvt. Brig. Gen. USV, March 13, 1865	April 10, 1867	
Davis, Edwin Page	Colonel	153rd Regiment New York Volunteer Infantry	Bvt. Brig. Gen. USV, October 19, 1864	February 14, 1865	
Davis, Hasbrouck	Colonel	12th Regiment Illinois Volunteer Cavalry	Bvt. Brig. Gen. USV, March 13, 1865	March 12, 1865	
Davis, Henry Greene	Lt. Colonel	101st Regiment U.S. Colored Infantry	Bvt. Brig. Gen. USV, March 13, 1865	April 10, 1865	
Davis, Nelson Henry	Major	Asst. Inspector Gen. USA	Bvt. Brig. Gen. USA, March 13, 1865	July 23, 1868	
Davis, William Watts Hart	Colonel	104th Regiment Pennsylvania Volunteer Infantry	Bvt. Brig. Gen. USV, March 13, 1865	April 10, 1866	
Dawes, Rufus R.	Lt. Colonel	6th Regiment Wisconsin Volunteer Infantry	Bvt. Brig. Gen. USV, March 13, 1865	April 10, 1866	
Dawson, Andrew Rea Zina	Colonel	187th Regiment Ohio Volunteer Infantry	Bvt. Brig. Gen. USV, November 21, 1865	March 12, 1866	
Dawson, Samuel Kennedy	Lt. Colonel	15th Regiment U.S. Infantry	Bvt. Brig. Gen. USA, March 13, 1865	July 25, 1866	
Day, Hannibal	Colonel	6th Regiment U.S. Infantry	Bvt. Brig. Gen. USA, March 13, 1865	July 26, 1866	
Day, Henry Martyn	Colonel	91st Regiment Illinois Volunteer Infantry	Bvt. Brig. Gen. USV, March 26, 1865	March 12, 1866	
Day, Nicholas Wykoff	Colonel	131st Regiment New York Volunteer Infantry	Bvt. Brig. Gen. USV, March 13, 1865	March 13, 1867	
Dayton, Oscar Veniah	Colonel	19th Regiment Veteran Reserve Corps	Bvt. Brig. Gen. USV, March 13, 1865	April 10, 1865	
Deems, James Monroe	Lt. Colonel	1st Regiment Maryland Volunteer Cavalry	Bvt. Brig. Gen. USV, March 13, 1865	July 27, 1866	
De Groat, Charles Henry	Colonel	32nd Regiment Wisconsin Volunteer Infantry	Bvt. Brig. Gen. USV, March 13, 1865	March 12, 1866	
De Hart, Richard P.	Colonel	128th Regiment Indiana Volunteer Infantry	Bvt. Brig. Gen. USV, March 13, 1865	April 10, 1866	
De Lacy, William	Colonel	164th Regiment New York Volunteer Infantry	Bvt. Brig. Gen. USV, March 13, 1865	March 12, 1866	
De Land, Charles Victor	Colonel	1st Regiment Michigan Volunteer Sharpshooters; A commander of Camp Douglas military prisoner of war camp	Bvt. Brig. Gen. USV, March 13, 1865	March 13, 1867	
De Russy, René Edward	Colonel	Corps of Engineers, USA	Bvt. Brig. Gen. USA, March 13, 1865	July 26, 1866	Died November 23, 1865, nominated July 17, 1866 posthumous award
Denison, Andrew Woods	Colonel	8th Regiment Maryland Volunteer Infantry	Bvt. Brig. Gen. USV, August 19, 1864; Bvt. Maj. Gen. USV, March 31, 1865	February 20, 1865; July 23, 1866	
Dennis, John Benjamin	Major	Additional Paymaster, USV	Bvt. Brig. Gen. USV, March 13, 1865	February 16, 1869	
Devereux, Arthur Forrester	Colonel	19th Regiment Massachusetts Volunteer Infantry	Bvt. Brig. Gen. USV, March 13, 1865	April 10, 1866	
Devol, Hiram F.	Colonel	36th Regiment Ohio Volunteer Infantry	Bvt. Brig. Gen. USV, March 13, 1865	March 12, 1866	
De Witt, David Porter	Colonel	10th Regiment Veteran Reserve Corps	Bvt. Brig. Gen. USV, March 13, 1865	March 12, 1866	
Dick, George Frederick	Colonel	86th Regiment Indiana Volunteer Infantry	Bvt. Brig. Gen. USV, March 13, 1865	March 12, 1866	
Dickerson, Christopher J.	Lt. Colonel	10th Regiment Michigan Volunteer Infantry	Bvt. Brig. Gen. USV, March 13, 1865	March 28, 1867	
Dickey, William Henry	Colonel	84th Regiment U.S. Colored Infantry	Bvt. Brig. Gen. USV, March 13, 1865	July 19, 1867	
Dickinson, Joseph	Major	Asst. Adjutant Gen. USV	Bvt. Brig. Gen. USV, March 13, 1865	February 7, 1867	
Dilworth, Caleb James	Colonel	85th Regiment Illinois Volunteer Infantry	Bvt. Brig. Gen. USV, March 13, 1865	March 12, 1866	
Dimick, Justin	Colonel	1st Regiment U.S. Artillery	Bvt. Brig. Gen. USA, March 13, 1865	July 26, 1866	
Dimon, Charles Augustus Ropes	Colonel	1st Regiment U.S. Volunteer Infantry	Bvt. Brig. Gen. USV, March 13, 1865	March 12, 1866	
Diven, Alexander S.	Major	Asst. Adjutant Gen. USV	Bvt. Brig. Gen. USV, August 30, 1864	February 20, 1865	
Diven, Charles Worth	Colonel	200th Regiment Pennsylvania Volunteer Infantry	Bvt. Brig. Gen. USV, March 25, 1865	March 12, 1866	
Dixon, William Dunlap	Lt. Colonel	6th Regiment Reserves Pennsylvania Volunteer Infantry	Bvt. Brig. Gen. USV, March 13, 1865	July 27, 1867	
Doan, Azariah Wall	Lt. Colonel	79th Regiment Ohio Volunteer Infantry	Bvt. Brig. Gen. USV, March 13, 1865	March 18, 1866	
Dodd, Levi Axtell	Lt. Colonel	211th Regiment Pennsylvania Volunteer Infantry	Bvt. Brig. Gen. USV, April 2, 1865	March 12, 1866	
Dodge, George S.	Colonel	Quartermaster Dept., USV	Bvt. Brig. Gen. USV, January 15, 1865	February 14, 1865	
Donaldson, James Lowry	Colonel	Quartermaster, USA	Bvt. Brig. Gen. USA, September 17, 1864; Bvt. Maj. Gen. USA, March 13, 1865; Bvt. Maj. Gen. USV, June 20, 1865	February 14, 1865; March 2, 1867; March 12, 1866	Bvt. Brig. Gen. nomination by Pres. Lincoln, January 23, 1865
Donohoe, Michael Thomas	Colonel	10th Regiment New Hampshire Volunteer Infantry	Bvt. Brig. Gen. USV, March 13, 1865	March 12, 1866	
Dornblaser, Benjamin	Colonel	46th Regiment Illinois Volunteer Infantry	Bvt. Brig. Gen. USV, February 20, 1865; Bvt. Maj. Gen. USV, March 13, 1865	March 10, 1865; April 26, 1866	
Doster, William Emile	Lt. Colonel	4th Regiment Pennsylvania Volunteer Cavalry	Bvt. Brig. Gen. USV, March 13, 1865	July 27, 1866	
Doubleday, Ulysses	Colonel	45th Regiment U.S. Colored Infantry	Bvt. Brig. Gen. USV, March 13, 1865	March 12, 1866	
Dox, Hamilton Bogart	Lt. Colonel	12th Regiment Illinois Volunteer Cavalry	Bvt. Brig. Gen. USV, May 29, 1866	July 27, 1866	
Drake, Francis Marion	Lt. Colonel	36th Regiment Iowa Volunteer Infantry	Bvt. Brig. Gen. USV, February 22, 1865	March 3, 1865	
Drake, George Bernard	Lt. Colonel	Asst. Adjutant Gen. USV	Bvt. Brig. Gen. USV, March 13, 1865	April 19, 1866	
Draper, Alonzo Granville	Colonel	36th Regiment U.S. Colored Infantry	Bvt. Brig. Gen. USV, October 28, 1864	February 14, 1865	
Draper, William Franklin	Lt. Colonel	36th Regiment Massachusetts Volunteer Infantry	Bvt. Brig. Gen. USV, March 13, 1865	March 2, 1867	
Drew, Charles Wilson	Colonel	76th Regiment U.S. Colored Infantry	Bvt. Brig. Gen. USV, March 26, 1865	March 12, 1866	
Drum, Richard Coulter	Lt. Colonel	Asst. Adjutant Gen. USA	Bvt. Brig. Gen. USA, March 13, 1865	July 25, 1866	
Duane, James Chatham	Major	Corps of Engineers, USA	Bvt. Brig. Gen. USA, March 13, 1865	May 4, 1866	Retired as Regular Army Brigadier General, 1888.
Ducat, Arthur Charles	Lt. Colonel	12th Regiment Illinois Volunteer Infantry	Bvt. Brig. Gen. USV, March 13, 1865	April 10, 1866	
Dudley, Nathan Augustus Monroe	Major	15th Regiment U.S. Infantry	Bvt. Brig. Gen. USV, January 19, 1865	February 14, 1865	
Dudley, William Wade	Lt. Colonel	19th Regiment Indiana Volunteer Infantry	Bvt. Brig. Gen. USV, March 13, 1865	March 24, 1868	Further nomination rejected July 17, 1868; Renomination confirmed February 16, 1869
Duer, John O.	Colonel	45th Regiment Illinois Volunteer Infantry	Bvt. Brig. Gen. USV, July 12, 1865	March 12, 1866	
Duff, William L.	Lt. Colonel	2nd Regiment Illinois Volunteer Light Artillery	Bvt. Brig. Gen. USV, March 13, 1865	February 6, 1867	
Duncan, Samuel Augustus	Colonel	4th Regiment U.S. Colored Infantry	Bvt. Brig. Gen. USV, October 28, 1864; Bvt. Maj. Gen. USV, March 13, 1865	February 14, 1865; April 26, 1866	
Duncan, Thomas	Major	3rd Regiment U.S. Cavalry	Bvt. Brig. Gen. USA, March 13, 1865	March 2, 1867	
Dunham, Thomas Harrison	Major	11th Regiment Massachusetts Volunteer Infantry	Bvt. Brig. Gen. USV, March 13, 1865	April 5, 1867	
Dunlap, Henry C.	Colonel	3rd Kentucky Infantry Regiment	Bvt. Brig. Gen. USV, March 13, 1865	March 12, 1866	
Dunlap, James	Captain	Quartermaster Dept., USV	Bvt. Brig. Gen. USV, March 13, 1865	February 6, 1867	
Dunn, William McKee	Lt. Colonel	Asst. Judge Advocate, USA	Bvt. Brig. Gen. USA, March 13, 1865	March 12, 1867	
Duryea, Hiram	Colonel	5th Regiment New York Volunteer Infantry	Bvt. Brig. Gen. USV, March 13, 1865	April 10, 1866	
Duryee, Jacob Eugene	Lt. Colonel	2nd Regiment Maryland Volunteer Infantry	Bvt. Brig. Gen. USV, March 13, 1865	July 19, 1867	
Dustin, Daniel	Colonel	105th Regiment Illinois Volunteer Infantry	Bvt. Brig. Gen. USV, March 16, 1865	March 12, 1867	
Dutton, Arthur Henry	Colonel	21st Regiment Connecticut Volunteer Infantry	Bvt. Brig. Gen. USV, May 26, 1864	March 2, 1867	Posthumous award
Dutton, Everell Fletcher	Lt. Colonel	105th Regiment Illinois Volunteer Infantry	Bvt. Brig. Gen. USV, March 16, 1865	March 2, 1867	Posthumous award
Dye, William McEntire	Colonel	20th Regiment Iowa Volunteer Infantry	Bvt. Brig. Gen. USV, March 13, 1865	May 18, 1866	
Dyer, Isaac	Colonel	15th Regiment Maine Volunteer Infantry	Bvt. Brig. Gen. USV, March 13, 1865	July 23, 1866	

== Union brevet generals; lower actual, substantive grade ==
=== E ===
Name	Highest actual grade	Unit	Brevet grade, rank date	Date confirmed	Notes, other dates
Eastman, Seth	Lt. Colonel	1st Regiment U.S. Infantry	Bvt. Brig. Gen. USA, August 9, 1866	February 23, 1867	
Easton, Langdon Cheves	Colonel	Quartermaster, USA	Bvt. Brig. Gen. USA, September 17, 1864; Bvt. Maj. Gen. USA, March 13, 1865	February 20, 1865; March 13, 1867	Bvt. Brig. Gen. nomination by Pres. Lincoln, December 12, 1864
Eaton, Charles G.	Colonel	72nd Regiment Ohio Volunteer Infantry	Bvt. Brig. Gen. USV, March 13, 1865	July 26, 1866	
Eaton, John Jr.	Colonel	63rd Regiment U.S. Colored Infantry	Bvt. Brig. Gen. USV, March 13, 1865	March 12, 1866	
Eaton, Joseph Horace	Major	Paymaster, USA	Bvt. Brig. Gen. USA, March 13, 1865	February 23, 1867	
Eckert, Thomas Thompson	Major	Additional Aide-de-Camp, USV	Bvt. Brig. Gen. USV, March 13, 1865	March 12, 1866	
Edgerton, Alonzo Jay	Colonel	67th Regiment U.S. Colored Infantry	Bvt. Brig. Gen. USV, March 13, 1865	April 10, 1866	
Edmands, Joseph Cushing	Colonel	32nd Regiment Massachusetts Volunteer Infantry	Bvt. Brig. Gen. USV, March 13, 1865	March 12, 1866	
Edwards, Clark Swett	Colonel	5th Regiment Maine Volunteer Infantry	Bvt. Brig. Gen. USV, March 13, 1865	July 23, 1866	
Eggleston, Beroth B.	Colonel	1st Regiment Ohio Volunteer Cavalry	Bvt. Brig. Gen. USV, March 13, 1865	March 12, 1865	
Ekin, James Adams	Colonel	Asst. Quartermaster, USA	Bvt. Brig. Gen. USA, March 8, 1865	May 4, 1866	
Eldridge, Hamilton N.	Colonel	127th Regiment Illinois Volunteer Infantry	Bvt. Brig. Gen. USV, March 13, 1865	May 18, 1866	
Elliott, Isaac Hughes	Lt. Colonel	33rd Regiment Illinois Volunteer Infantry	Bvt. Brig. Gen. USV, March 13, 1865	July 27, 1866	
Elliott, Samuel Mackenzie	Lt. Colonel	79th Regiment New York Volunteer Infantry	Bvt. Brig. Gen. USV, March 13, 1865	March 7, 1867	
Ellis, Augustus van Horne	Colonel	124th Regiment New York Volunteer Infantry	Bvt. Brig. Gen. USV, July 2, 1863	February 16, 1869	Killed at Battle of Gettysburg, July 2, 1863; Posthumous award
Ellis, Theodore Grenville	Colonel	14th Regiment Connecticut Volunteer Infantry	Bvt. Brig. Gen. USV, March 13, 1865	March 12, 1866	
Elstner, George Ruter	Lt. Colonel	50th Regiment Ohio Volunteer Infantry	Bvt. Brig. Gen. USV, August 8, 1864	July 19, 1867	Killed before Atlanta August 8, 1864; Posthumous award
Elwell, John Johnson	Captain	Quartermaster Dept., USV	Bvt. Brig. Gen. USV, March 13, 1865	February 21, 1867	
Ely, John	Colonel	26th Regiment Veteran Reserve Corps	Bvt. Brig. Gen. USV, April 15, 1865; Bvt. Maj. Gen. USV, April 15, 1865	March 12, 1867; February 14, 1868	
Ely, Ralph	Colonel	8th Regiment Michigan Volunteer Infantry	Bvt. Brig. Gen. USV, April 2, 1865	March 12, 1867	
Ely, William Grosvenor	Colonel	18th Regiment Connecticut Volunteer Infantry	Bvt. Brig. Gen. USV, March 13, 1865	February 6, 1867	
Engelmann, Adolph	Colonel	43rd Regiment Illinois Volunteer Infantry	Bvt. Brig. Gen. USV, March 13, 1865	May 18, 1866	
Enochs, William Henry	Colonel	1st Veteran Regiment West Virginia Volunteer Infantry	Bvt. Brig. Gen. USV, March 13, 1865	March 12, 1866	U. S. House of Representatives 1891-1893
Ent, Wellington Harry	Colonel	6th Regiment Reserves Pennsylvania Volunteer Infantry	Bvt. Brig. Gen. USV, March 13, 1865	July 27, 1866	
Enyart, David A.	Colonel	1st Kentucky Infantry Regiment (Union)	Bvt. Brig. Gen. USV, March 13, 1865	April 10, 1866	
Erskine, Albert	Colonel	13th Regiment Illinois Volunteer Cavalry	Bvt. Brig. Gen. USV, March 13, 1865	May 18, 1866	
Estes, Lewellyn Garrish	Major	Asst. Adjutant Gen. USV	Bvt. Brig. Gen. USV, March 13, 1865	April 10, 1866	Medal of Honor
Evans, George Spafford	Colonel	2nd Regiment California Volunteer Cavalry	Bvt. Brig. Gen. USV, March 13, 1865	July 27, 1866	Brig. Gen. of California Militia, July, 1864
Everett, Charles	Colonel	2nd Regiment Louisiana Volunteer Infantry	Bvt. Brig. Gen. USV, March 13, 1865	July 23, 1866	

== Union brevet generals; lower actual, substantive grade ==
=== F ===
Name	Highest actual grade	Unit	Brevet grade, rank date	Date confirmed	Notes, other dates
Fairchild, Cassius	Colonel	16th Regiment Wisconsin Volunteer Infantry	Bvt. Brig. Gen. USV, March 13, 1865	March 12, 1866	
Fairchild, Harrison Stiles	Colonel	89th Regiment New York Volunteer Infantry	Bvt. Brig. Gen. USV, March 13, 1865	March 12, 1866	
Fallows, Samuel	Colonel	49th Regiment Wisconsin Volunteer Infantry	Bvt. Brig. Gen. USV, October 24, 1865	March 12, 1866	
Fardella, Enrico	Colonel	85th Regiment New York Volunteer Infantry	Bvt. Brig. Gen. USV, March 13, 1865	March 12, 1866	
Farnsworth, Addison	Colonel	Veteran Reserve Corps	Bvt. Brig. Gen. USV, September 27, 1865	March 12, 1866	
Farnum, John Egbert	Colonel	11th Regiment Veteran Reserve Corps	Bvt. Brig. Gen. USV, January 3, 1866	April 10, 1866	
Farrar, Bernard Gains	Colonel	6th Regiment U.S. Colored Heavy Artillery	Bvt. Brig. Gen. USV, March 9, 1865	March 10, 1865	
Fearing, Benjamin Dana	Colonel	92nd Regiment Ohio Volunteer Infantry	Bvt. Brig. Gen. USV, December 2, 1864	February 14, 1865	
Finley, Clement Alexander	Colonel	Surgeon General (ret.)	Bvt. Brig. Gen. USA, March 13, 1865	July 26, 1866	
Fisher, Benjamin Franklin	Colonel	Chief Signal Officer, USV	Bvt. Brig. Gen. USV, March 13, 1865	February 6, 1867	
Fisher, Joseph Washington	Colonel	195th Regiment Pennsylvania Volunteer Infantry	Bvt. Brig. Gen. USV, November 4, 1865	March 12, 1866	
Fisk, Henry C.	Lt. Colonel	65th Regiment New York Volunteer Infantry	Bvt. Brig. Gen. USV, April 6, 1865	March 12, 1867	
Fiske, Francis Skinner	Lt. Colonel	2nd Regiment New Hampshire Volunteer Infantry	Bvt. Brig. Gen. USV, March 13, 1865	July 27, 1866	
Fiske, William Oscar	Colonel	1st Regiment Louisiana Volunteer Infantry	Bvt. Brig. Gen. USV, March 13, 1865	July 23, 1866	
Fitz Simmons, Charles	Lt. Colonel	21st Regiment New York Volunteer Cavalry	Bvt. Brig. Gen. USV, March 13, 1865	April 10, 1866	
Fitzhugh, Charles Lane	Colonel	6th Regiment New York Volunteer Cavalry	Bvt. Brig. Gen. USV, March 13, 1865; Bvt. Brig. Gen. USA, March 13, 1865	March 12, 1867	
Flanigan, Mark	Lt. Colonel	24th Regiment Michigan Volunteer Infantry	Bvt. Brig. Gen. USV, March 13, 1865	March 28, 1867	
Fleming, Rufus Edward	Lt. Colonel	6th Regiment West Virginia Volunteer Cavalry	Bvt. Brig. Gen. USV, March 13, 1865	May 18, 1866	
Fletcher, Thomas Clement	Colonel	47th Regiment Missouri Volunteer Infantry	Bvt. Brig. Gen. USV, March 13, 1865	April 10, 1866	
Flood, Martin	Lt. Colonel	15th Regiment Veteran Reserve Corps	Bvt. Brig. Gen. USV, March 13, 1865	March 13, 1867	
Flynn, John H.	Colonel	28th Regiment Pennsylvania Volunteer Infantry	Bvt. Brig. Gen. USV, March 13, 1865	April 10, 1866	
Fonda, John G.	Colonel	118th Regiment Illinois Volunteer Infantry	Bvt. Brig. Gen. USV, June 28, 1865	March 12, 1866	
Ford, James Hobart	Colonel	2nd Regiment Colorado Volunteer Cavalry	Bvt. Brig. Gen. USV, December 10, 1864	February 14, 1865	
Forsyth, George Alexander	Major	8th Regiment Illinois Volunteer Cavalry	Bvt. Brig. Gen. USV, March 13, 1865	February 14, 1865	
Foster, George Perkins	Colonel	4th Regiment Vermont Infantry Volunteers	Bvt. Brig. Gen. USV, August 1, 1864	February 14, 1865	
Foster, John A.	Lt. Colonel	175th Regiment New York Volunteer Infantry	Bvt. Brig. Gen. USV, September 28, 1865	March 12, 1866	
Foust, Benezet Forst	Lt. Colonel	10th Regiment Veteran Reserve Corps	Bvt. Brig. Gen. USV, March 13, 1865	July 27, 1866	
Fowler, Edward Brush	Colonel	84th Regiment New York Volunteer Infantry	Bvt. Brig. Gen. USV, March 13, 1865; Bvt. Maj. Gen. USV, March 13, 1865	April 10, 1866; March 12, 1866	
Franchot, Richard	Colonel	121st Regiment New York Volunteer Infantry	Bvt. Brig. Gen. USV, March 13, 1865	March 2, 1867	
Francine, Louis R.	Colonel	7th Regiment New Jersey Volunteer Infantry	Bvt. Brig. Gen. USV, July 2, 1863	March 26, 1867	Mortally wounded at Battle of Gettysburg; July 2, 1863: Posthumous award
Frank, Paul	Colonel	52nd Regiment New York Volunteer Infantry	Bvt. Brig. Gen. USV, March 13, 1865	February 6, 1867	
Frankle, Jones	Colonel	2nd Regiment Massachusetts Volunteer Heavy Artillery	Bvt. Brig. Gen. USV, September 3, 1865	March 12, 1866	
Fraser, John	Colonel	140th Regiment Pennsylvania Volunteer Infantry	Bvt. Brig. Gen. USV, March 13, 1865	March 12, 1866	
Frazar, Douglas	Colonel	104th Regiment U.S. Colored Infantry	Bvt. Brig. Gen. USV, March 13, 1865	April 10, 1866	
Frederick, Calvin Harlowe	Lt. Colonel	5th Regiment Veteran Reserve Corps	Bvt. Brig. Gen. USV, March 13, 1865	July 23, 1866	
French, Winsor Brown	Lt. Colonel	77th Regiment New York Volunteer Infantry	Bvt. Brig. Gen. USV, March 13, 1865	March 2, 1867	
Frink, Henry Alexander	Colonel	186th Regiment Pennsylvania Volunteer Infantry	Bvt. Brig. Gen. USV, October 4, 1865	March 12, 1866	
Frisbie, Henry Newton	Colonel	92nd Regiment U.S. Colored Infantry	Bvt. Brig. Gen. USV, March 13, 1865	March 28, 1867	
Fritz, Peter Jr.	Lt. Colonel	99th Regiment Pennsylvania Volunteer Infantry	Bvt. Brig. Gen. USV, March 13, 1865	February 6, 1867	
Frizell, Joseph Washington	Colonel	94th Regiment Ohio Volunteer Infantry	Bvt. Brig. Gen. USV, March 13, 1865	April 10, 1866	
Frohock, William Thompson	Colonel	66th Regiment U.S. Colored Infantry	Bvt. Brig. Gen. USV, March 13, 1865	May 18, 1866	
Fry, Cary Harrison	Lt. Colonel	Deputy Paymaster Gen. USA	Bvt. Brig. Gen. USA, October 15, 1867	February 14, 1868	
Fuller, Henry William	Colonel	75th Regiment U.S. Colored Infantry	Bvt. Brig. Gen. USV, March 13, 1865	March 12, 1866	
Fullerton, Joseph Scott	Lt. Colonel	Asst. Adjutant Gen. USV	Bvt. Brig. Gen. USV, March 13, 1865	March 12, 1866	
Funke, Otto	Lt. Colonel	11th Regiment Illinois Volunteer Cavalry	Bvt. Brig. Gen. USV, March 13, 1865	March 12, 1866	
Fyffe, Edward Pierce	Colonel	7th Regiment Veteran Reserve Corps	Bvt. Brig. Gen. USV, March 13, 1865	March 12, 1866	

== Union brevet generals; lower actual, substantive grade ==
=== G ===
Name	Highest actual grade	Unit	Brevet grade, rank date	Date confirmed	Notes, other dates
Gage, Joseph S.	Colonel	29th Regiment Missouri Volunteer Infantry	Bvt. Brig. Gen. USV, June 15, 1865	March 12, 1866	
Gallagher, Thomas Foster	Colonel	11th Regiment Reserves Pennsylvania Volunteer Infantry	Bvt. Brig. Gen. USV, March 13, 1865	March 28, 1867	
Gallup, George W.	Colonel	14th Regiment Kentucky Volunteer Infantry	Bvt. Brig. Gen. USV, March 13, 1865	March 28, 1867	
Gansevoort, Henry Sanford	Colonel	13th Regiment New York Volunteer Cavalry	Bvt. Brig. Gen. USV, June 24, 1865	nominated, not confirmed	
Gardiner, Alexander	Colonel	14th Regiment New Hampshire Volunteer Infantry	Bvt. Brig. Gen. USV, September 19, 1864	April 16, 1867	
Gardner, John Lane	Colonel	2nd Regiment U.S. Artillery	Bvt. Brig. Gen. USA, March 13, 1865	July 26, 1866	
Garland, John	Colonel	8th Regiment U.S. Infantry	Bvt. Brig. Gen. USA, August 20, 1847 (for Mexican War service).		
Garrard, Israel	Colonel	7th Regiment Ohio Volunteer Cavalry	Bvt. Brig. Gen. USV, June 20, 1865	March 12, 1866	
Garrard, Jeptha	Colonel	1st Regiment U.S. Colored Cavalry	Bvt. Brig. Gen. USV, March 13, 1865	May 18, 1867	
Gates, Theodore Burr	Colonel	80th Regiment New York Volunteer Infantry	Bvt. Brig. Gen. USV, March 13, 1865	May 18, 1867	
Gates, William	Colonel	3rd Regiment U.S. Artillery	Bvt. Brig. Gen. USA, March 13, 1865	July 26, 1866	
Geddes, James Loraine	Colonel	8th Regiment Iowa Volunteer Infantry	Bvt. Brig. Gen. USV, June 5, 1865	March 12, 1866	
Gerhardt, Joseph	Colonel	46th Regiment New York Volunteer Infantry	Bvt. Brig. Gen. USV, March 13, 1865	July 23, 1866	
Gibson, Horatio Gates	Colonel	2nd Regiment Ohio Volunteer Heavy Artillery	Bvt. Brig. Gen. USV, March 13, 1865	March 12, 1866	
Gibson, William Harvey	Colonel	49th Regiment Ohio Volunteer Infantry	Bvt. Brig. Gen. USV, March 13, 1865	July 27, 1866	
Giesy, Henry H.	Major	46th Regiment Ohio Volunteer Infantry	Bvt. Brig. Gen. USV, May 28, 1864	April 16, 1867	Killed at Dallas, Georgia, May 28, 1864; Posthumous award
Gilbert, Samuel Augustus	Colonel	8th Regiment Ohio Volunteer Cavalry	Bvt. Brig. Gen. USV, March 13, 1865	April 10, 1866	
Gilchrist, Charles Allen	Colonel	50th Regiment U.S. Colored Infantry	Bvt. Brig. Gen. USV, March 26, 1865	March 12, 1866	
Gile, George W.	Colonel	9th Regiment Veteran Reserve Corps	Bvt. Brig. Gen. USV, May 6, 1865	March 12, 1866	
Ginty, George Clay	Colonel	47th Regiment Wisconsin Volunteer Infantry	Bvt. Brig. Gen. USV, September 28, 1865	March 12, 1866	
Given, Josiah	Colonel	74th Regiment Ohio Volunteer Infantry	Bvt. Brig. Gen. USV, March 13, 1865	July 26, 1866	
Given, William	Colonel	102nd Regiment Ohio Volunteer Infantry	Bvt. Brig. Gen. USV, March 13, 1865	July 23, 1866	
Glasgow, Samuel Lyle	Colonel	23rd Regiment Iowa Volunteer Infantry	Bvt. Brig. Gen. USV, December 19, 1864	February 14, 1865	
Gleason, John Hasset	Lt. Colonel	63rd Regiment New York Volunteer Infantry	Bvt. Brig. Gen. USV, March 13, 1865; Bvt. Maj. Gen. USV, March 13, 1865	February 6, 1867; March 18, 1867	
Gleason, Newell	Colonel	87th Regiment Indiana Volunteer Infantry	Bvt. Brig. Gen. USV, March 13, 1865	March 12, 1866	
Glenny, William	Lt. Colonel	64th Regiment New York Volunteer Infantry	Bvt. Brig. Gen. USV, March 13, 1865	March 12, 1866	
Gobin, John Peter Shindel	Colonel	47th Regiment Pennsylvania Volunteer Infantry	Bvt. Brig. Gen. USV, March 13, 1865	July 23, 1866	
Goddard, William	Major	1st Regiment Rhode Island Volunteer Infantry	Bvt. Brig. Gen. USV, March 13, 1865	July 19, 1867	
Godman, James Harper	Colonel	4th Regiment Ohio Volunteer Infantry	Bvt. Brig. Gen. USV, March 13, 1865	May 18, 1866	
Goff, Nathan Jr.	Colonel	37th Regiment U.S. Colored Infantry	Bvt. Brig. Gen. USV, March 13, 1865	March 12, 1866	
Goodell, Arthur Augustus	Lt. Colonel	36th Regiment Massachusetts Volunteer Infantry	Bvt. Brig. Gen. USV, March 13, 1865	March 28, 1867	
Gooding, Oliver Paul	Colonel	31st Regiment Massachusetts Volunteer Infantry	Bvt. Brig. Gen. USV, March 13, 1865; Bvt. Maj. Gen. USV, March 13, 1865	April 10, 1866; July 23, 1866	
Goodyear, Ellsworth D. S.	Lt. Colonel	10th Regiment Connecticut Volunteer Infantry	Bvt. Brig. Gen. USV, April 2, 1865	March 12, 1866	
Gowen, George Washington	Colonel	48th Regiment Pennsylvania Volunteer Infantry	Bvt. Brig. Gen. USV, April 2, 1865	February 16, 1869	
Graham, Harvey	Colonel	22nd Regiment Iowa Volunteer Infantry	Bvt. Brig. Gen. USV, July 25, 1865	February 6, 1867	
Graham, Samuel	Colonel	5th Regiment New York Volunteer Heavy Artillery	Bvt. Brig. Gen. USV, March 13, 1865	February 6, 1867	
Graham, William Montrose	Captain	1st Regiment U.S. Artillery	Bvt. Brig. Gen. USA, March 13, 1865	July 23, 1866	Major General in the Spanish–American War
Granger, George Frederick	Colonel	9th Regiment Maine Volunteer Infantry	Bvt. Brig. Gen. USV, June 12, 1865	March 12, 1866	
Greeley, Edwin Seneca	Colonel	10th Regiment Connecticut Volunteer Infantry	Bvt. Brig. Gen. USV, March 13, 1865	March 12, 1866	
Green, William N. Jr.	Lt. Colonel	173rd Regiment New York Volunteer Infantry	Bvt. Brig. Gen. USV, April 9, 1864	July 19, 1867	Mortally wounded at the Battle of Pleasant Hill, Louisiana, April 9, 1864; Posthumous award
Greene, James Durrell	Colonel	6th Regiment U.S. Infantry	Bvt. Brig. Gen. USA, March 13, 1865	July 25, 1866	
Greene, Oliver Duff	Major	Asst. Adjutant Gen. USA	Bvt. Brig. Gen. USA, March 13, 1865	February 14, 1868	Medal of Honor
Gregg, John Irvin	Colonel	16th Regiment Pennsylvania Volunteer Cavalry	Bvt. Brig. Gen. USV, August 1, 1864; Bvt. Brig. Gen. USA, March 13, 1865; Bvt. Maj. Gen. USV, March 13, 1865	February 20, 1865; March 12, 1866	
Gregg, William M.	Colonel	179th Regiment New York Volunteer Infantry	Bvt. Brig. Gen. USV, April 2, 1865	March 12, 1866	
Gregory, Edgar M.	Colonel	91st Regiment Pennsylvania Volunteer Infantry	Bvt. Brig. Gen. USV, September 30, 1864; Bvt. Maj. Gen. USV, August 9, 1866	February 14, 1865; February 6, 1867	
Grier, David Perkins	Colonel	77th Regiment Illinois Volunteer Infantry	Bvt. Brig. Gen. USV, March 26, 1865	March 10, 1865	
Grier, William Nicholson	Lt. Colonel	1st Regiment U.S. Cavalry	Bvt. Brig. Gen. USA, March 13, 1865	July 25, 1867	
Griffin, Daniel F.	Lt. Colonel	38th Regiment Indiana Volunteer Infantry	Bvt. Brig. Gen. USV, March 13, 1865	March 12, 1866	
Grindlay, James Glass	Colonel	146th Regiment New York Volunteer Infantry	Bvt. Brig. Gen. USV, March 13, 1865	July 19, 1867	Medal of Honor
Grosvenor, Charles Henry	Lt. Colonel	18th Regiment Ohio Volunteer Infantry	Bvt. Brig. Gen. USV, March 13, 1865	May 23, 1866	U. S. House of Representatives 1893-1907
Grosvenor, Thomas W.	Lt. Colonel	12th Regiment Illinois Volunteer Cavalry	Bvt. Brig. Gen. USV, March 13, 1865	February 16, 1869	
Grover, Ira Glanton	Colonel	7th Regiment Indiana Volunteer Infantry	Bvt. Brig. Gen. USV, March 13, 1865	July 23, 1866	
Grubb, Edward Burd	Colonel	37th Regiment New Jersey Volunteer Infantry	Bvt. Brig. Gen. USV, March 13, 1865	July 23, 1866	
Guiney, Patrick Robert	Colonel	9th Regiment Massachusetts Volunteer Infantry	Bvt. Brig. Gen. USV, March 13, 1865	April 10, 1866	
Guppey, Joshua James	Colonel	23rd Regiment Wisconsin Volunteer Infantry	Bvt. Brig. Gen. USV, March 13, 1865	March 12, 1866	
Gurney, William	Colonel	127th Regiment New York Volunteer Infantry	Bvt. Brig. Gen. USV, May 19, 1865	March 12, 1866	
Guss, Henry Ruhl	Colonel	97th Regiment Pennsylvania Volunteer Infantry	Bvt. Brig. Gen. USV, March 13, 1865; Bvt. Maj. Gen. USV, March 13, 1865	July 19, 1867; July 19, 1867	
Gwyn, James	Colonel	118th Regiment Pennsylvania Volunteer Infantry	Bvt. Brig. Gen. USV, September 30, 1864; Bvt. Maj. Gen. USV, April 1, 1865	February 14, 1865; February 16, 1869	

== Union brevet generals; lower actual, substantive grade ==
=== H ===
Name	Highest actual grade	Unit	Brevet grade, rank date	Date confirmed	Notes, other dates
Hagner, Peter Valentine	Lt. Colonel	Ordnance Dept., USA	Bvt. Brig. Gen. USA, March 13, 1865	July 25, 1866	USMA, 1836; Mexican–American War veteran; Retired as Regular Army Colonel, 1881
Haines, Thomas Jefferson	Major	Commissary Gen. of Subsistence Dept., USA	Bvt. Brig. Gen. USA, March 13, 1865	July 25, 1866	USMA, 1849; Died as Regular Army major, 1883
Hall, Caldwell Keppelle	Lt. Colonel	5th Regiment New Jersey Volunteer Infantry	Bvt. Brig. Gen. USV, March 13, 1865	March 12, 1866	For Battle of Monocacy
Hall, Cyrus	Colonel	14th Regiment Illinois Volunteer Infantry	Bvt. Brig. Gen. USV, March 13, 1865	March 12, 1866	Mexican–American War veteran
Hall, Henry Seymour	Lt. Colonel	43rd Regiment U.S. Colored Infantry	Bvt. Brig. Gen. USV, March 13, 1865	May 18, 1866	Brevet for Battle of the Crater; Medal of Honor for Battle of Gaines Mill and Second Battle of Rappahannock Station
Hall, Jairus William	Colonel	4th Michigan Volunteer Infantry Regiment (reorganized)	Bvt. Brig. Gen. USV, March 13, 1865	April 10, 1866	
Hall, James Abram	Lt. Colonel	1st Battalion Maine Volunteer Light Artillery	Bvt. Brig. Gen. USV, March 7, 1865	March 10, 1865	
Hall, James Frederick	Lt. Colonel	1st Regiment New York Volunteer Engineers	Bvt. Brig. Gen. USV, February 24, 1865	March 3, 1865	
Hall, Robert M.	Colonel	38th Regiment U.S. Colored Infantry	Bvt. Brig. Gen. USV, March 13, 1865	July 23, 1866	Died as Regular Army first lieutenant, 1874
Hallowell, Edward Needles	Colonel	54th Regiment Massachusetts (Colored) Volunteer Infantry	Bvt. Brig. Gen. USV, June 27, 1865	March 12, 1866	Wounded at Second Battle of Fort Wagner, July 18, 1863
Halpine, Charles Graham ("Miles O'Reilly")	Major	Asst. Adjutant Gen. USV	Bvt. Brig. Gen. USV, March 13, 1865	April 10, 1866	
Hambright, Henry Augustus	Colonel	79th Regiment Pennsylvania Volunteer Infantry	Bvt. Brig. Gen. USV, June 7, 1865	March 12, 1866	
Hamilton, William Douglas	Colonel	9th Regiment Ohio Volunteer Cavalry	Bvt. Brig. Gen. USV, April 9, 1865	March 12, 1866	
Hamlin, Charles	Major	Asst. Adjutant Gen. USV	Bvt. Brig. Gen. USV, March 13, 1865	March 12, 1866	
Hammell, John Sweeney	Colonel	66th Regiment New York Volunteer Infantry	Bvt. Brig. Gen. USV, March 13, 1865	March 12, 1866	
Hammond, John	Colonel	5th Regiment New York Volunteer Cavalry	Bvt. Brig. Gen. USV, March 13, 1865	April 10, 1866	
Hammond, John Henry	Major	Asst. Adjutant Gen. USV	Bvt. Brig. Gen. USV, October 31, 1864	February 20, 1865	
Hanna, William	Lt. Colonel	50th Regiment Illinois Volunteer Infantry	Bvt. Brig. Gen. USV, March 13, 1865	July 17, 1868	
Hardenbergh, Jacob Brodhead	Colonel	80th Regiment New York Volunteer Infantry	Bvt. Brig. Gen. USV, March 13, 1865	March 12, 1866	
Hardie, James Allen	Colonel	ADC; Staff Officer; Inspector General	Bvt. Brig. Gen., USA; March 3, 1865; Bvt. Maj. Gen. USA; March 13, 1865	March 9, 1865; July 14, 1866	Appointed Brig. Gen., USV (November 29, 1862) appointment not confirmed, revoked January 22, 1863
Harding, Chester Jr.	Colonel	43rd Regiment Missouri Volunteer Infantry	Bvt. Brig. Gen. USV, May 27, 1865	March 12, 1866	
Harlan, Emory B.	Captain	Asst. Adjutant Gen. USV	Bvt. Brig. Gen. USV, March 13, 1865	July 27, 1866	
Harnden, Henry	Lt. Colonel	1st Regiment Wisconsin Volunteer Cavalry	Bvt. Brig. Gen. USV, March 13, 1865	March 12, 1866	
Harriman, Samuel	Colonel	37th Regiment Wisconsin Volunteer Infantry	Bvt. Brig. Gen. USV, April 2, 1865	March 12, 1866	
Harriman, Walter	Colonel	11th Regiment New Hampshire Volunteer Infantry	Bvt. Brig. Gen. USV, March 13, 1865	July 23, 1866	Governor of New Hampshire 1867–1869
Harris, Andrew Lintner	Colonel	75th Regiment Ohio Volunteer Infantry	Bvt. Brig. Gen. USV, March 13, 1865	July 23, 1866	Governor of Ohio 1906–1909
Harris, Benjamin Foster	Major	4th Regiment Veteran Reserve Corps	Bvt. Brig. Gen. USV, March 13, 1865	July 23, 1866	
Harris, Charles L.	Colonel	11th Regiment Wisconsin Volunteer Infantry	Bvt. Brig. Gen. USV, March 13, 1865	March 12, 1866	
Harrison, Benjamin	Colonel	70th Regiment Indiana Volunteer Infantry	Bvt. Brig. Gen. USV, January 23, 1865	February 14, 1865	Served as a U.S. Senator (R, Ind.) 1881–87 Served as President of the United States 1889–93
Harrison, Marcus LaRue	Colonel	1st Regiment Arkansas Volunteer Cavalry	Bvt. Brig. Gen. USV, March 13, 1865	April 10, 1866	
Harrison, Thomas Jefferson	Colonel	8th Regiment Indiana Volunteer Cavalry	Bvt. Brig. Gen. USV, January 31, 1865	February 20, 1865	
Hart, James H.	Lt. Colonel	71st Regiment Ohio Volunteer Infantry	Bvt. Brig. Gen. USV, March 13, 1865	May 12, 1866	
Hart, Orson H.	Lt. Colonel	Asst. Adjutant Gen. USV	Bvt. Brig. Gen. USV, March 13, 1865	March 12, 1866	
Hartshorne, William Ross	Colonel	190th Regiment Pennsylvania Volunteer Infantry	Bvt. Brig. Gen. USV, March 13, 1865	March 12, 1866	
Hartsuff, William	Lt. Colonel	Asst. Inspector Gen. USV	Bvt. Brig. Gen. USV, January 24, 1865	March 10, 1865	
Hartwell, Alfred Stedman	Colonel	55th Regiment Massachusetts Colored Volunteer Infantry	Bvt. Brig. Gen. USV, December 30, 1864	February 14, 1865	
Hartwell, Charles A.	Colonel	10th Regiment U.S. Colored Heavy Artillery	Bvt. Brig. Gen. USV, December 2, 1865	March 12, 1866	
Haskell, Llewellyn Frost	Colonel	41st Regiment U.S. Colored Infantry	Bvt. Brig. Gen. USV, February 28, 1865	March 9, 1865	Also nominated to rank from March 13, 1865; Confirmed March 12, 1866
Hastings, Russell	Lt. Colonel	23rd Regiment Ohio Volunteer Infantry	Bvt. Brig. Gen. USV, March 13, 1865	July 26, 1866	
Haughton, Nathaniel	Lt. Colonel	25th Regiment Ohio Volunteer Infantry	Bvt. Brig. Gen. USV, March 13, 1865	May 18, 1866	
Hawkes, George Perkins	Lt. Colonel	21st Regiment Massachusetts Volunteer Infantry	Bvt. Brig. Gen. USV, March 13, 1865	March 30, 1867	
Hawkins, Isaac Roberts	Lt. Colonel	7th Regiment Tennessee Volunteer Cavalry	Bvt. Brig. Gen. USV, March 13, 1865	March 3, 1869	
Hawkins, Rush Christopher	Colonel	9th Regiment New York Volunteer Infantry	Bvt. Brig. Gen. USV, March 13, 1865	July 23, 1866	
Hawley, William	Colonel	3rd Regiment Wisconsin Volunteer Infantry	Bvt. Brig. Gen. USV, March 16, 1865	March 12, 1866	
Hayden, Julius	Major	10th Regiment U.S. Infantry	Bvt. Brig. Gen. USA, March 13, 1865	March 2, 1867	
Hayes, Edwin L.	Colonel	100th Regiment Ohio Volunteer Infantry	Bvt. Brig. Gen. USV, January 12, 1865	February 14, 1865	
Hayes, Philip Cornelius	Lt. Colonel	103rd Regiment Ohio Volunteer Infantry	Bvt. Brig. Gen. USV, March 13, 1865	February 14, 1868	
Hayman, Samuel Brinklé	Major	10th Regiment U.S. Infantry	Bvt. Brig. Gen. USV, March 13, 1865	March 30, 1867	
Hazard, John Gardner	Major	1st Regiment Rhode Island Volunteer Light Artillery	Bvt. Brig. Gen. USV, May 3, 1865	March 12, 1866	
Healy, Robert Wallace	Major	58th Regiment Illinois Volunteer Infantry	Bvt. Brig. Gen. USV, March 13, 1865	April 10, 1866	
Heath, Francis Edward	Colonel	19th Regiment Maine Volunteer Infantry	Bvt. Brig. Gen. USV, March 13, 1865	July 23, 1866	
Heath, Herman H.	Major	7th Regiment Iowa Volunteer Cavalry	Bvt. Brig. Gen. USV, March 13, 1865; Bvt. Maj. Gen. USV, March 13, 1865	March 12, 1866; July 23, 1866	
Heath, Thomas Tinsley	Colonel	5th Regiment Ohio Volunteer Cavalry	Bvt. Brig. Gen. USV, December 15, 1864	March 10, 1865	
Hedrick, John Morrow	Lt. Colonel	15th Regiment Iowa Volunteer Infantry	Bvt. Brig. Gen. USV, March 13, 1865	March 12, 1866	
Heine, Wilhelm	Colonel	103rd Regiment New York Volunteer Infantry	Bvt. Brig. Gen. USV, March 13, 1865	February 14, 1868	
Heinrichs, Gustav	Lt. Colonel	41st Regiment Missouri Volunteer Infantry	Bvt. Brig. Gen. USV, March 13, 1865	April 10, 1866	
Henderson, Robert Miller	Lt. Colonel	7th Regiment Reserves Pennsylvania Volunteer Infantry	Bvt. Brig. Gen. USV, March 13, 1865	July 27, 1866	
Henderson, Thomas Jefferson	Colonel	112th Regiment Illinois Volunteer Infantry	Bvt. Brig. Gen. USV, November 30, 1864	February 20, 1865	
Hendrickson, John	Colonel	13th Regiment Veteran Reserve Corps	Bvt. Brig. Gen. USV, March 13, 1865	March 12, 1866	
Hennessy, John A.	Lt. Colonel	52nd Regiment Pennsylvania Volunteer Infantry	Bvt. Brig. Gen. USV, March 13, 1865	July 27, 1866	
Henry, Guy Vernor	Colonel	40th Regiment Massachusetts Volunteer Infantry	Bvt. Brig. Gen. USV, October 28, 1864	February 14, 1865	Medal of Honor; Became a Regular Army Brigadier General. Major General during the Spanish–American War.
Henry, William Wirt	Colonel	10th Regiment Vermont Infantry Volunteers	Bvt. Brig. Gen. USV, March 7, 1865	March 9, 1865	Medal of Honor
Herrick, Walter F.	Lt. Colonel	43rd Regiment Ohio Volunteer Infantry	Bvt. Brig. Gen. USV, March 13, 1865	March 12, 1867	
Herring, Charles Paine	Lt. Colonel	118th Regiment Pennsylvania Volunteer Infantry	Bvt. Brig. Gen. USV, March 13, 1865	March 12, 1866	
Hickenlooper, Andrew	Lt. Colonel	Asst. Inspector Gen. USV	Bvt. Brig. Gen. USV, March 13, 1865	March 12, 1866	
Hill, Bennett Hoskin	Lt. Colonel	5th Regiment U.S. Artillery	Bvt. Brig. Gen. USA, January 31, 1865	February 20, 1865	Nominated by Pres. Lincoln, February 1, 1865
Hill, Charles W.	Colonel	128th Regiment Ohio Volunteer Infantry	Bvt. Brig. Gen. USV, March 13, 1865; Bvt. Maj. Gen. USV, March 13, 1865	July 19, 1867; July 19, 1867	
Hill, Jonathan Augustus	Colonel	11th Regiment Maine Volunteer Infantry	Bvt. Brig. Gen. USV, April 9, 1865	March 12, 1866	
Hill, Sylvester Gardner	Colonel	35th Regiment Iowa Volunteer Infantry	Bvt. Brig. Gen. USV, December 15, 1864	February 14, 1865	Killed at Battle of Nashville, December 15, 1864; Posthumous award
Hillis, David Burke	Colonel	17th Regiment Iowa Volunteer Infantry	Bvt. Brig. Gen. USV, March 13, 1865	April 10, 1866	
Hillyer, William Silliman	Colonel	Additional Aide-de-Camp, USV	Bvt. Brig. Gen. USV, March 13, 1865	July 27, 1866	
Hitchcock, George Howard	Lt. Colonel	132nd Regiment New York Volunteer Infantry	Bvt. Brig. Gen. USV, June 28, 1865	March 12, 1866	
Hobart, Harrison Carroll	Colonel	21st Regiment Wisconsin Volunteer Infantry	Bvt. Brig. Gen. USV, January 12, 1865	February 14, 1865	
Hobson, William	Lt. Colonel	17th Regiment Maine Volunteer Infantry	Bvt. Brig. Gen. USV, April 6, 1865	February 21, 1867	
Hoffman, Henry C.	Colonel	23rd Regiment New York Volunteer Infantry	Bvt. Brig. Gen. USV, March 13, 1865	July 26, 1866	
Hoffman, William	Colonel	3rd Regiment U.S. Infantry; Commissary General of Prisoners	Bvt. Brig. Gen. USA, October 7, 1864; Bvt. Maj. Gen. USA, March 13, 1865	February 20, 1865; July 14, 1866	Bvt. Brig. Gen. nomination by Pres. Lincoln, December 12, 1864
Hofmann, John William	Colonel	56th Regiment Pennsylvania Volunteer Infantry	Bvt. Brig. Gen. USV, August 1, 1864	February 20, 1865	
Hoge, George Blaikie	Colonel	113th Regiment Illinois Volunteer Infantry	Bvt. Brig. Gen. USV, March 13, 1865	March 12, 1866	
Hoge, George Washington	Colonel	183rd Regiment Ohio Volunteer Infantry	Bvt. Brig. Gen. USV, March 13, 1865	March 12, 1866	
Holabird, Samuel Beckley	Colonel	Additional Aide-de-Camp, USA	Bvt. Brig. Gen. USA, March 13, 1865	July 28, 1866	Retired as Regular Army brigadier general, 1890
Holbrook, Mellen Taft	Lt. Colonel	173rd Regiment New York Volunteer Infantry	Bvt. Brig. Gen. USV, March 13, 1865	February 14, 1868	
Holloway, Ephraim Samuel	Major	41st Regiment Ohio Volunteer Infantry	Bvt. Brig. Gen. USV, March 13, 1865	March 12, 1866	
Holman, John H.	Colonel	1st Regiment U.S. Colored Infantry	Bvt. Brig. Gen. USV, March 13, 1865	March 12, 1866	
Holt, Thomas	Lt. Colonel	70th Regiment New York Volunteer Infantry	Bvt. Brig. Gen. USV, March 13, 1865	March 29, 1867	
Holter, Marcellus John Wesley	Lt. Colonel	195th Regiment Ohio Volunteer Infantry	Bvt. Brig. Gen. USV, March 13, 1865	April 10, 1866	
Hooker, Ambrose Eugene	Lt. Colonel	6th Regiment California Volunteer Infantry	Bvt. Brig. Gen. USV, March 13, 1865	March 2, 1867	
Horn, John Watts	Colonel	6th Regiment Maryland Volunteer Infantry	Bvt. Brig. Gen. USV, October 19, 1864	February 14, 1865	
Hotchkiss, Charles Truman	Colonel	89th Regiment Illinois Volunteer Infantry	Bvt. Brig. Gen. USV, March 13, 1865	March 12, 1866	
Hough, John	Major	Asst. Adjutant Gen. USV	Bvt. Brig. Gen. USV, March 13, 1865	March 12, 1866	
Houghtaling, Charles	Colonel	1st Regiment Illinois Volunteer Light Artillery	Bvt. Brig. Gen. USV, March 13, 1865	April 10, 1866	
Houghton, Moses Barrett	Colonel	3rd Michigan Volunteer Infantry Regiment (reorganized)	Bvt. Brig. Gen. USV, March 13, 1865	March 12, 1866	
Howard, Charles Henry	Colonel	128th Regiment U.S. Colored Infantry	Bvt. Brig. Gen. USV, August 15, 1865	March 12, 1866	
Howe, John Homer	Lt. Colonel	124th Regiment Illinois Volunteer Infantry	Bvt. Brig. Gen. USV, March 13, 1865	March 12, 1866	
Howland, Horace Newton	Lt. Colonel	3rd Regiment Ohio Volunteer Cavalry	Bvt. Brig. Gen. USV, March 13, 1865	April 10, 1866	
Howland, Joseph	Colonel	16th Regiment New York Volunteer Infantry	Bvt. Brig. Gen. USV, March 13, 1865	March 12, 1866	
Hoyt, Charles Henry	Colonel	Quartermaster Dept., USV	Bvt. Brig. Gen. USV, March 13, 1865	March 12, 1866	
Hoyt, George Henry	Lt. Colonel	15th Regiment Kansas Volunteer Cavalry	Bvt. Brig. Gen. USV, March 13, 1865	March 2, 1867	
Hoyt, Henry Martyn	Colonel	52nd Regiment Pennsylvania Volunteer Infantry	Bvt. Brig. Gen. USV, March 13, 1865	March 2, 1866	
Hubbard, James	Colonel	2nd Regiment Connecticut Volunteer Heavy Artillery	Bvt. Brig. Gen. USV, April 6, 1865	March 12, 1866	
Hubbard, Lucius Frederick	Colonel	5th Regiment Minnesota Volunteer Infantry	Bvt. Brig. Gen. USV, December 16, 1864	February 14, 1865	
Hubbard, Thomas Hamlin	Colonel	30th Regiment Maine Volunteer Infantry	Bvt. Brig. Gen. USV, July 13, 1865	March 12, 1866	Served as brigadier general during the Spanish–American War
Hudnutt, Joseph O.	Lt. Colonel	38th Regiment Iowa Volunteer Infantry	Bvt. Brig. Gen. USV, March 13, 1865	April 13, 1867	
Hudson, John G.	Colonel	60th Regiment U.S. Colored Infantry	Bvt. Brig. Gen. USV, March 13, 1865	February 14, 1868	
Huey, Pennock	Colonel	8th Regiment Pennsylvania Volunteer Cavalry	Bvt. Brig. Gen. USV, March 13, 1865	March 12, 1866	
Hugunin, James R.	Major	12th Regiment Illinois Volunteer Infantry	Bvt. Brig. Gen. USV, March 13, 1865	March 12, 1866	
Humphrey, Thomas W.	Colonel	95th Regiment Illinois Volunteer Infantry	Bvt. Brig. Gen. USV, June 10, 1864	February 20, 1865	Killed at Guntown, Mississippi, June 10, 1864; Posthumous award
Humphrey, William	Colonel	2nd Regiment Michigan Volunteer Infantry	Bvt. Brig. Gen. USV, August 1, 1864	February 20, 1865	
Hunt, Lewis Cass	Captain	67th Regiment Ohio Volunteer Infantry	Bvt. Brig. Gen. USV, March 13, 1865	April 10, 1866	Not to be confused with Brig. Gen. Lewis Cass Hunt (1824-1886).
Hunter, Morton Craig	Colonel	82nd Regiment Indiana Volunteer Infantry	Bvt. Brig. Gen. USV, March 13, 1865	March 12, 1866	
Hurd, John Ricker	Colonel	173rd Regiment Ohio Volunteer Infantry	Bvt. Brig. Gen. USV, March 13, 1865	July 17, 1868	Award not issued
Hurst, Samuel H.	Colonel	73rd Regiment Ohio Volunteer Infantry	Bvt. Brig. Gen. USV, March 13, 1865	March 12, 1866	
Hutchins, Rue Pugh	Lt. Colonel	94th Regiment Ohio Volunteer Infantry	Bvt. Brig. Gen. USV, March 13, 1865	July 23, 1866	
Hutchinson, Frederick Sharpe	Colonel	15th Regiment Michigan Volunteer Infantry	Bvt. Brig. Gen. USV, May 24, 1865	April 10, 1866	
Hyde, Thomas Worcester	Colonel	1st Regiment Maine Veteran Volunteer Infantry	Bvt. Brig. Gen. USV, April 2, 1865; Bvt. Maj. Gen. USV, April 2, 1865	March 12, 1866; March 3, 1869	Medal of Honor

== Union brevet generals; lower actual, substantive grade ==
=== I ===
Name	Highest actual grade	Unit	Brevet grade, rank date	Date confirmed	Notes, other dates
Ihrie, George Peter	Colonel	Additional Aide-de-Camp, USV	Bvt. Brig. Gen. USV, March 13, 1865; Bvt. Brig. Gen. USA, March 2, 1867	February 21, 1867; February 14, 1868	Rejected brevet in the U.S. Volunteers
Ingraham, Timothy	Colonel	38th Regiment Massachusetts Volunteer Infantry	Bvt. Brig. Gen. USV, October 2, 1865	March 12, 1867	
Innes, William Power	Colonel	1st Regiment Michigan Volunteer Engineers	Bvt. Brig. Gen. USV, March 13, 1865	April 8, 1867	
Irvine, William	Lt. Colonel	10th Regiment New York Volunteer Cavalry	Bvt. Brig. Gen. USV, March 13, 1865	March 28, 1867	
Irwin, William Howard	Colonel	49th Regiment Pennsylvania Volunteer Infantry	Bvt. Brig. Gen. USV, March 13, 1865	April 10, 1866	
Ives, Brayton	Colonel	1st Regiment Connecticut Volunteer Cavalry	Bvt. Brig. Gen. USV, March 13, 1865	February 14, 1868	

== Union brevet generals; lower actual, substantive grade ==
=== J ===
Name	Highest actual grade	Unit	Brevet grade, rank date	Date confirmed	Notes, other dates
Jackson, Joseph Cooke	Lt. Colonel	26th Regiment New Jersey Volunteer Infantry	Bvt. Brig. Gen. USV, March 13, 1865	March 2, 1867	
Jackson, Samuel McCartney	Colonel	11th Regiment Reserves; Pennsylvania Volunteer Infantry	Bvt. Brig. Gen. USV, March 13, 1865	July 27, 1866	For Battles of Wilderness, Spotsylvania and Bethesda Church
Jacobs, Ferris Jr.	Lt. Colonel	3rd Regiment New York Volunteer Cavalry	Bvt. Brig. Gen. USV, March 13, 1865	February 21, 1867	
James, William Levis	Colonel	Quartermaster Dept., USV	Bvt. Brig. Gen. USV, March 1, 1866	April 10, 1866	
Jardine, Edward	Captain	Veteran Reserve Corps	Bvt. Brig. Gen. USV, November 2, 1865	March 12, 1866	
Jarvis, Dwight Jr.	Colonel	13th Regiment Ohio Volunteer Infantry	Bvt. Brig. Gen. USV, March 13, 1865	February 14, 1868	
Jeffries, Noah Lemuel	Colonel	20th Regiment Veteran Reserve Corps	Bvt. Brig. Gen. USV, March 30, 1865	March 12, 1866	
Jenkins, Horatio Jr.	Lt. Colonel	4th Regiment Massachusetts Volunteer Cavalry	Bvt. Brig. Gen. USV, March 13, 1865	March 12, 1866	
Jennison, Samuel Pearce	Lt. Colonel	10th Regiment Minnesota Volunteer Infantry	Bvt. Brig. Gen. USV, March 13, 1865	March 12, 1866	
Johns, Thomas Denton	Colonel	7th Regiment Massachusetts Volunteer Infantry	Bvt. Brig. Gen. USV, March 13, 1865	July 26, 1866	
Johnson, Charles Adams	Colonel	25th Regiment New York Volunteer Infantry	Bvt. Brig. Gen. USV, March 13, 1865	February 16, 1869	
Johnson, Gilbert Marquis La Fayette	Colonel	13th Regiment Indiana Volunteer Cavalry	Bvt. Brig. Gen. USV, March 13, 1865	March 12, 1866	
Johnson, James M.	Colonel	1st Regiment Arkansas Volunteer Infantry	Bvt. Brig. Gen. USV, March 13, 1865	April 10, 1867	
Johnson, Lewis	Colonel	44th Regiment U.S. Colored Infantry	Bvt. Brig. Gen. USV, March 13, 1865	April 10, 1866	
Johnson, Robert	Colonel	1st Regiment Tennessee Volunteer Cavalry	Bvt. Brig. Gen. USV, March 13, 1865	March 12, 1866	Son of Tennessee military governor and eventual U.S President Andrew Johnson
Jones, Edward Franc	Colonel	26th Regiment Massachusetts Volunteer Infantry	Bvt. Brig. Gen. USV, March 13, 1865	April 10, 1866	
Jones, Fielder A.	Colonel	8th Regiment Indiana Volunteer Cavalry	Bvt. Brig. Gen. USV, March 13, 1865	April 10, 1866	
Jones, John Sills	Colonel	174th Regiment Ohio Volunteer Infantry	Bvt. Brig. Gen. USV, June 27, 1865	March 12, 1866	
Jones, Joseph Blackburn	Colonel	68th Regiment U.S. Colored Infantry	Bvt. Brig. Gen. USV, March 13, 1865	March 12, 1866	
Jones, Samuel B.	Colonel	78th Regiment U.S. Colored Infantry	Bvt. Brig. Gen. USV, March 31, 1865	April 10, 1866	
Jones, Theodore	Colonel	30th Regiment Ohio Volunteer Infantry	Bvt. Brig. Gen. USV, March 13, 1865	March 12, 1866	
Jones, Wells S.	Colonel	53rd Regiment Ohio Volunteer Infantry	Bvt. Brig. Gen. USV, March 13, 1865	March 12, 1866	
Jones, William Price	Major	Additional Aide-de-Camp, USV	Bvt. Brig. Gen. USV, March 13, 1865	March 28, 1867	
Jordan, Thomas Jefferson	Colonel	9th Regiment Pennsylvania Volunteer Cavalry	Bvt. Brig. Gen. USV, February 25, 1865	March 9, 1865	
Jourdan, James	Colonel	158th Regiment New York Volunteer Infantry	Bvt. Brig. Gen. USV, October 28, 1864: Bvt. Maj. Gen. USV, March 13, 1865	February 14, 1865; July 27, 1866	
Judson, Roscius Winslow	Colonel	142nd Regiment New York Volunteer Infantry	Bvt. Brig. Gen. USV, March 13, 1865	March 2, 1867	
Judson, William R.	Colonel	6th Regiment Kansas Volunteer Cavalry	Bvt. Brig. Gen. USV, March 13, 1865	July 23, 1866	

== Union brevet generals; lower actual, substantive grade ==
=== K ===
Name	Highest actual grade	Unit	Brevet grade, rank date	Date confirmed	Notes, other dates
Kargé, Joseph	Colonel	2nd Regiment New Jersey Volunteer Cavalry	Bvt. Brig. Gen. USV, March 13, 1865	March 12, 1866	
Keifer, Joseph Warren	Colonel	110th Ohio Volunteer Infantry Regiment	Bvt. Brig. Gen. USV, October 19, 1864; Bvt. Maj. Gen. USV, April 9, 1865	February 14, 1865; March 12, 1866	Speaker of the United States House of Representatives; Major General in the Spanish–American War
Keily, Daniel J.	Colonel	2nd Regiment Louisiana Volunteer Cavalry	Bvt. Brig. Gen. USV, March 13, 1865	March 12, 1866	
Kellogg, John Azor	Colonel	6th Regiment Wisconsin Volunteer Infantry	Bvt. Brig. Gen. USV, April 9, 1865	March 12, 1866	
Kelly, John Henry	Colonel	114th Regiment Ohio Volunteer Infantry	Bvt. Brig. Gen. USV, March 13, 1865	July 26, 1866	
Kelton, John Cunningham	Major	Asst. Adjutant Gen. USA	Bvt. Brig. Gen. USA, March 13, 1865	July 25, 1866	Retired as regular army brigadier general and adjutant general, 1892.
Kennedy, Robert Patterson	Major	Asst. Adjutant Gen. USV	Bvt. Brig. Gen. USV, March 13, 1865	March 12, 1866	
Kennett, Henry Gassaway	Colonel	79th Regiment Ohio Volunteer Infantry	Bvt. Brig. Gen. USV, March 13, 1865	July 19, 1867	
Kent, Loren	Colonel	29th Regiment Illinois Volunteer Infantry	Bvt. Brig. Gen. USV, March 22, 1865	March 12, 1866	
Ketner, James	Major	16th Regiment Kansas Volunteer Cavalry	Bvt. Brig. Gen. USV, March 13, 1865	July 23, 1866	
Kidd, James Harvey	Colonel	6th Regiment Michigan Volunteer Cavalry	Bvt. Brig. Gen. USV, March 13, 1865	July 26, 1866	
Kiddoo, Joseph Barr	Colonel	22nd Regiment U.S. Colored Infantry	Bvt. Brig. Gen. USV, June 15, 1865; Bvt. Brig. Gen. USA, March 2, 1867; Bvt. Maj. Gen. USV, September 4, 1865	March 12, 1866; July 28, 1868; March 12, 1866	
Kilburn, Charles Lawrence	Colonel	Asst. Commissary Gen. of Subsistence, USA	Bvt. Brig. Gen. USA, March 13, 1865	July 25, 1866	
Kilgour, William Mather	Lt. Colonel	75th Regiment Illinois Volunteer Infantry	Bvt. Brig. Gen. USV, June 20, 1865	March 12, 1866	
Kimball, John White	Colonel	53rd Regiment Massachusetts Volunteer Infantry	Bvt. Brig. Gen. USV, March 13, 1865	February 14, 1868	
Kimball, William King	Colonel	12th Regiment Maine Volunteer Infantry	Bvt. Brig. Gen. USV, March 13, 1865	April 10, 1866	
Kimberly, Robert Lewis	Colonel	191st Regiment Ohio Volunteer Infantry	Bvt. Brig. Gen. USV, March 13, 1865	April 10, 1866	
King, Adam Eckfeldt	Major	Asst. Adjutant Gen. USV	Bvt. Brig. Gen. USV, March 13, 1865	April 10, 1866	
King, John Fields	Lt. Colonel	114th Regiment Illinois Volunteer Infantry	Bvt. Brig. Gen. USV, March 13, 1865	April 10, 1866	
King, William Sterling	Colonel	4th Regiment Massachusetts Volunteer Heavy Artillery	Bvt. Brig. Gen. USV, March 13, 1865	February 6, 1867	
Kingsbury, Charles Peoble	Major	Ordnance Dept., USA	Bvt. Brig. Gen. USA, March 13, 1865	February 23, 1867	
Kingsbury, Henry Denison	Colonel	189th Regiment Ohio Volunteer Infantry	Bvt. Brig. Gen. USV, March 10, 1865	March 10, 1865	
Kinney, Thomas Jefferson	Colonel	119th Regiment Illinois Volunteer Infantry	Bvt. Brig. Gen. USV, March 26, 1865	March 12, 1866	
Kinsey, William Baker	Lt. Colonel	161st Regiment New York Volunteer Infantry	Bvt. Brig. Gen. USV, March 13, 1865	March 24, 1868	
Kinsman, Josiah Burnham	Lt. Colonel	Additional Aide-de-Camp, USV	Bvt. Brig. Gen. USV, March 13, 1865; Bvt. Maj. Gen. USV, March 13, 1865	March 24, 1868; July 18, 1868	
Kirby, Byron	Lt. Colonel	3rd Regiment Maryland Volunteer Cavalry	Bvt. Brig. Gen. USV, September 6, 1865	March 12, 1868	Not issued.
Kirby, Dennis Thomas	Lt. Colonel	27th Regiment Missouri Volunteer Infantry	Bvt. Brig. Gen. USV, March 13, 1865	March 12, 1866	Medal of Honor
Kirby, Isaac Minor	Colonel	101st Regiment Ohio Volunteer Infantry	Bvt. Brig. Gen. USV, January 12, 1865	March 10, 1865	
Kirkham, Ralph Wilson	Major	Quartermaster, USA	Bvt. Brig. Gen. USA, March 13, 1865	March 2, 1867	
Kise, Reuben C.	Colonel	120th Regiment Indiana Volunteer Infantry	Bvt. Brig. Gen. USV, March 13, 1865	March 12, 1866	
Kitchell, Edward	Lt. Colonel	98th Regiment Illinois Volunteer Infantry	Bvt. Brig. Gen. USV, March 13, 1865	March 12, 1866	
Kitching, John Howard	Colonel	6th Regiment New York Volunteer Heavy Artillery	Bvt. Brig. Gen. USV, August 1, 1864	February 14, 1865	Posthumous brevet for Cedar Creek.
Knefler, Frederick	Colonel	79th Regiment Indiana Volunteer Infantry	Bvt. Brig. Gen. USV, March 13, 1865	March 12, 1866	
Knowles, Oliver Blachly	Colonel	21st Regiment Pennsylvania Volunteer Cavalry	Bvt. Brig. Gen. USV, March 13, 1865	July 19, 1867	
Kozlay, Eugene A.	Colonel	54th Regiment New York Volunteer Infantry	Bvt. Brig. Gen. USV, March 13, 1865	April 10, 1866	
Krez, Conrad	Colonel	27th Regiment Wisconsin Volunteer Infantry	Bvt. Brig. Gen. USV, March 26, 1865	March 12, 1866	
Krzyżanowski, Włodzimierz	Colonel	58th New York Volunteer Infantry Regiment	Bvt, Brig. Gen. USV, March 2, 1865	March 9, 1865	Temporary Brig. Gen. (November 29, 1862–March 4, 1863)
Kueffner, William Charles	Colonel	149th Regiment Illinois Volunteer Infantry	Bvt. Brig. Gen. USV, March 13, 1865	March 12, 1866	

== Union brevet generals; lower actual, substantive grade ==
=== L ===
Name	Highest actual grade	Unit	Brevet grade, rank date	Date confirmed	Notes, other dates
La Grange, Oscar Hugh	Colonel	1st Regiment Wisconsin Volunteer Cavalry	Bvt. Brig. Gen. USV, March 13, 1865	March 12, 1866	
La Motte, Charles Eugene	Colonel	6th Regiment U.S. Veteran Volunteer Infantry	Bvt. Brig. Gen. USV, March 13, 1865	April 10, 1866	
Laflin, Byron	Colonel	34th Regiment New York Volunteer Infantry	Bvt. Brig. Gen. USV, March 13, 1865	April 10, 1866	
Lagow, Clark B.	Colonel	Additional Aide-de-Camp, USV	Bvt. Brig. Gen. USV, March 13, 1865	July 27, 1866	
Landram, William Jennings	Colonel	19th Regiment Kentucky Volunteer Infantry	Bvt. Brig. Gen. USV, March 13, 1865	April 26, 1866	
Lane, John Quincy	Colonel	97th Regiment Ohio Volunteer Infantry	Bvt. Brig. Gen. USV, March 13, 1865	March 12, 1866	
Langdon, Elisha Bassett	Lt. Colonel	1st Regiment Ohio Volunteer Infantry	Bvt. Brig. Gen. USV, March 13, 1865	May 18, 1866	For Battles of Shiloh, Chickamauga, Chattanooga, Missionary Ridge
Lansing, Henry Seymour	Colonel	17th Regiment New York Volunteer Infantry	Bvt. Brig. Gen. USV, March 13, 1865	April 10, 1866	
Lasselle, William Polke	Lt. Colonel	9th Regiment Indiana Volunteer Infantry	Bvt. Brig. Gen. USV, March 13, 1865	April 10, 1866	
Latham, George R.	Colonel	6th Regiment West Virginia Volunteer Cavalry	Bvt. Brig. Gen. USV, March 13, 1865	March 12, 1867	
Laughlin, Rankin G.	Lt. Colonel	94th Regiment Illinois Volunteer Infantry	Bvt. Brig. Gen. USV, March 13, 1865	April 10, 1866	
Lawrence, Albert Gallatin	Captain	2nd Regiment U.S. Colored Cavalry	Bvt. Brig. Gen. USV, March 25, 1865	February 6, 1867	
Lawrence, William Henry	Major	Aide-de-Camp, USV	Bvt. Brig. Gen. USV, March 13, 1865	March 12, 1866	
Lawrence, William Hudson	Colonel	34th Regiment New Jersey Volunteer Infantry	Bvt. Brig. Gen. USV, March 13, 1865	May 18, 1866	
Le Duc, William Gates	Lt. Colonel	Quartermaster Dept., USV	Bvt. Brig. Gen. USV, March 13, 1865	March 12, 1866	
Le Favour, Heber	Colonel	22nd Regiment Michigan Volunteer Infantry	Bvt. Brig. Gen. USV, March 13, 1865	March 12, 1866	
Le Gendre, Charles W.	Colonel	51st Regiment New York Volunteer Infantry	Bvt. Brig. Gen. USV, March 13, 1865	April 10, 1866	
Leake, Joseph Bloomfield	Lt. Colonel	20th Regiment Iowa Volunteer Infantry	Bvt. Brig. Gen. USV, March 13, 1865	April 10, 1866	
Lee, Edward M.	Lt. Colonel	5th Regiment Michigan Volunteer Cavalry	Bvt. Brig. Gen. USV, March 13, 1865	March 12, 1866	
Lee, Horace Clark	Colonel	27th Regiment Massachusetts Volunteer Infantry	Bvt. Brig. Gen. USV, March 13, 1865	March 12, 1866	
Lee, John C.	Colonel	164th Regiment Ohio Volunteer Infantry	Bvt. Brig. Gen. USV, March 13, 1865	July 27, 1866	
Lee, William Raymond	Colonel	20th Regiment Massachusetts Volunteer Infantry	Bvt. Brig. Gen. USV, March 13, 1865	July 26, 1866	
Leech, William Albert	Lt. Colonel	90th Regiment Pennsylvania Volunteer Infantry	Bvt. Brig. Gen. USV, March 13, 1865	March 2, 1867	
Leiper, Charles Lewis	Lt. Colonel	6th Regiment Pennsylvania Volunteer Cavalry	Bvt. Brig. Gen. USV, March 13, 1865	March 12, 1866	
Leonard, Hiram	Lt. Colonel	Deputy Paymaster Gen. USA	Bvt. Brig. Gen. USA, March 13, 1865	March 2, 1867	
Leslie, Thomas Jefferson	Major	Paymaster, USA	Bvt. Brig. Gen. USA, March 13, 1865	July 27, 1866	
Lewis, Charles W.	Colonel	7th Regiment California Volunteer Infantry	Bvt. Brig. Gen. USV, March 13, 1865	July 27, 1866	
Lewis, John Randolph	Colonel	Veteran Reserve Corps	Bvt. Brig. Gen. USV, March 13, 1865	July 27, 1866	
Lewis, William Delaware Jr.	Colonel	110th Regiment Pennsylvania Volunteer Infantry	Bvt. Brig. Gen. USV, March 13, 1865	March 2, 1867	
Lieb, Herman	Colonel	5th Regiment U.S. Colored Artillery	Bvt. Brig. Gen. USV, March 13, 1865	May 18, 1866	
Lincoln, William Sever	Colonel	34th Regiment Massachusetts Volunteer Infantry	Bvt. Brig. Gen. USV, June 23, 1865	March 12, 1866	
Lindley, John M.	Lt. Colonel	19th Regiment Indiana Volunteer Infantry	Bvt. Brig. Gen. USV, March 13, 1865	July 19, 1867	Error in name corrected December 3, 1867
Lippincott, Charles Ellet	Colonel	33rd Regiment Illinois Volunteer Infantry	Bvt. Brig. Gen. USV, February 17, 1865	February 23, 1865	
Lippitt, Francis James	Lt. Colonel	2nd Regiment California Volunteer Infantry	Bvt. Brig. Gen. USV, March 13, 1865	July 27, 1866	
Lister, Frederick William	Lt. Colonel	31st Regiment Ohio Volunteer Infantry	Bvt. Brig. Gen. USV, March 13, 1865	March 12, 1866	
Litchfield, Allyne C.	Colonel	7th Regiment Michigan Volunteer Cavalry	Bvt. Brig. Gen. USV, March 13, 1865	April 10, 1867	
Littell, John Smith	Colonel	76th Regiment Pennsylvania Volunteer Infantry	Bvt. Brig. Gen. USV, January 15, 1865	February 23, 1865	
Littlefield, Milton Smith	Colonel	21st Regiment U.S. Colored Infantry	Bvt. Brig. Gen. USV, November 26, 1864	February 14, 1865	
Littlejohn, DeWitt Clinton	Colonel	110th Regiment New York Volunteer Infantry	Bvt. Brig. Gen. USV, March 13, 1865	March 2, 1867	
Livingston, Robert Ramsay	Colonel	1st Regiment Nebraska Volunteer Cavalry	Bvt. Brig. Gen. USV, June 21, 1865	March 12, 1866	
Locke, Frederick Thomas	Lt. Colonel	Asst. Adjutant Gen. USV	Bvt. Brig. Gen. USV, April 1, 1865	March 12, 1866	
Lockman, John Thomas	Colonel	119th Regiment New York Volunteer Infantry	Bvt. Brig. Gen. USV, March 13, 1865	March 12, 1866	
Loomis, Cyrus O.	Colonel	1st Regiment Michigan Volunteer Light Artillery	Bvt. Brig. Gen. USV, June 20, 1865	March 12, 1866	
Loomis, Gustavus A.	Colonel	5th Regiment U.S. Infantry	Bvt. Brig. Gen. USA, March 13, 1865	July 26, 1866	
Lord, Therndon Ellery	Captain	3rd Regiment New York Volunteer Infantry	Bvt. Brig. Gen. USV, March 13, 1865	March 28, 1867	
Loring, Charles Greeley	Lt. Colonel	Asst. Inspector Gen. USV	Bvt. Brig. Gen. USV, August 1, 1864; Bvt. Maj. Gen. USV, July 17, 1865	February 20, 1865; March 12, 1866	
Love, George Maltby	Colonel	116th Regiment New York Volunteer Infantry	Bvt. Brig. Gen. USV, March 7, 1865	March 10, 1865	Medal of Honor
Lovell, Charles Swain	Colonel	18th Regiment U.S. Infantry	Bvt. Brig. Gen. USA, March 13, 1865	March 12, 1867	
Lovell, Frederick Solon	Colonel	46th Regiment Wisconsin Volunteer Infantry	Bvt. Brig. Gen. USV, October 11, 1865	March 12, 1866	
Lowe, William Warren	Colonel	5th Regiment Iowa Volunteer Cavalry	Bvt. Brig. Gen. USV, March 13, 1865; Bvt. Brig. Gen. USA, March 13, 1865	March 12, 1866; July 23, 1866	
Ludington, Marshall Independence	Colonel	Quartermaster Dept., USV	Bvt. Brig. Gen. USV, March 13, 1865	July 27, 1866	19th Quartermaster General of the U.S. Army, Major General in the Spanish–American War
Ludlow, Benjamin Chambers	Major	4th Regiment Missouri Volunteer Cavalry	Bvt. Brig. Gen. USV, October 28, 1864	March 28, 1867	
Ludlow, William Handy	Major	Additional Aide-de-Camp, USV	Bvt. Brig. Gen. USV, March 13, 1865; Bvt. Maj. Gen. USV, March 13, 1865	March 28, 1867; March 28, 1867	
Lyle, Peter	Colonel	90th Regiment Pennsylvania Volunteer Infantry	Bvt. Brig. Gen. USV, March 13, 1865	July 23, 1866	
Lyman, Luke	Lt. Colonel	27th Regiment Massachusetts Volunteer Infantry	Bvt. Brig. Gen. USV, March 13, 1865	July 19, 1867	
Lynch, James Canning	Colonel	183rd Regiment Pennsylvania Volunteer Infantry	Bvt. Brig. Gen. USV, March 13, 1865	July 26, 1866	
Lynch, William Francis	Colonel	58th Regiment Illinois Volunteer Infantry	Bvt. Brig. Gen. USV, January 31, 1865	February 20, 1865	
Lyon, William Penn	Colonel	13th Regiment Wisconsin Volunteer Infantry	Bvt. Brig. Gen. USV, October 26, 1865	March 12, 1866	

== Union brevet generals; lower actual, substantive grade ==
=== M ===
Name	Highest actual grade	Unit	Brevet grade, rank date	Date confirmed	Notes, other dates
McAlester, Miles Daniel	Captain	Corps of Engineers, USA	Bvt. Brig. Gen. USA, April 9, 1865	March 2, 1867	
McAllister, Robert	Colonel	11th Regiment New Jersey Volunteer Infantry	Bvt. Brig. Gen. USV, October 27, 1864; Bvt. Maj. Gen. USV, March 13, 1865	February 14, 1865; March 12, 1866	
McArthur, William Miltimore	Colonel	8th Regiment Maine Volunteer Infantry	Bvt. Brig. Gen. USV, March 13, 1865	May 18, 1866	Revised citation July 23, 1868
Macauley, Daniel	Colonel	11th Regiment Indiana Volunteer Infantry	Bvt. Brig. Gen. USV, March 13, 1865	March 12, 1866	Also spelled McCauley, spelling corrected January 4, 1867; Brevet for Battle of Cedar Creek
McBride, James Douglass	Lt. Colonel	8th Regiment U.S. Colored Heavy Artillery	Bvt. Brig. Gen. USV, March 13, 1865	April 10, 1866	
McCall, William H. H.	Lt. Colonel	200th Regiment Pennsylvania Volunteer Infantry	Bvt. Brig. Gen. USV, April 2, 1865	March 12, 1866	
McCallum, Daniel Craig	Colonel	Additional Aide-de-Camp, USV	Bvt. Brig. Gen. USV, September 24, 1864; Bvt. Maj. Gen. USV, March 13, 1865	February 15, 1865; February 6, 1867	
McCalmont, Alfred Brunson	Colonel	208th Regiment Pennsylvania Volunteer Infantry	Bvt. Brig. Gen. USV, March 13, 1865	March 12, 1866	
McCleery, James	Captain	41st Regiment Ohio Volunteer Infantry	Bvt. Brig. Gen. USV, March 13, 1865	July 27, 1866	
McClennan, Matthew Robert	Colonel	138th Regiment Pennsylvania Volunteer Infantry	Bvt. Brig. Gen. USV, April 2, 1865	March 12, 1866	
McClurg, Alexander Caldwell	Lt. Colonel	Asst. Adjutant Gen. USV	Bvt. Brig. Gen. USV, September 18, 1865	April 10, 1866	
McConihe, John	Colonel	169th Regiment New York Volunteer Infantry	Bvt. Brig. Gen. USV, June 1, 1864	February 14, 1868	Killed at the Battle of Cold Harbor, June 1, 1864
McConihe, Samuel	Major	93rd Regiment New York Volunteer Infantry	Bvt. Brig. Gen. USV, March 13, 1865	April 5, 1867	
McConnell, Henry Kumler	Colonel	71st Regiment Ohio Volunteer Infantry	Bvt. Brig. Gen. USV, March 13, 1865	March 12, 1866	
McConnell, John	Colonel	5th Regiment Illinois Volunteer Cavalry	Bvt. Brig. Gen. USV, March 13, 1865	July 23, 1866	Also shown confirmed March 12, 1866
McCook, Anson George	Colonel	2nd Regiment Ohio Volunteer Infantry	Bvt. Brig. Gen. USV, March 13, 1865	March 12, 1866	
McCook, Edwin Stanton	Colonel	31st Regiment Illinois Volunteer Infantry	Bvt. Brig. Gen. USV, March 13, 1865; Bvt. Maj. Gen. USV, March 13, 1865	March 12, 1866; April 16, 1867	
McCormick, Charles Comly	Colonel	7th Regiment Pennsylvania Volunteer Cavalry	Bvt. Brig. Gen. USV, March 13, 1865	March 12, 1866	
McCoy, Daniel	Lt. Colonel	175th Regiment Ohio Volunteer Infantry	Bvt. Brig. Gen. USV, March 13, 1865	March 12, 1866	
McCoy, Robert Abbott	Lt. Colonel	11th Regiment Reserves; Pennsylvania Volunteer Infantry	Bvt. Brig. Gen. USV, March 13, 1865	July 27, 1866	
McCoy, Thomas Franklin	Colonel	107th Regiment Pennsylvania Volunteer Infantry	Bvt. Brig. Gen. USV, April 1, 1865	April 10, 1866	
McCreary, David Berkley	Lt. Colonel	145th Regiment Pennsylvania Volunteer Infantry	Bvt. Brig. Gen. USV, March 13, 1865	February 21, 1867	
McCrillis, Lafayette	Colonel	3rd Regiment Illinois Volunteer Cavalry	Bvt. Brig. Gen. USV, September 4, 1864	February 14, 1868	Award not issued
McDougall, Charles	Major	Surgeon, USA	Bvt. Brig. Gen. USA, March 13, 1865	February 23, 1867	
MacDougall, Clinton Dugald	Colonel	111th Regiment New York Volunteer Infantry	Bvt. Brig. Gen. USV, February 25, 1865	March 3, 1865	
McEwen, Matthew	Major (Surgeon)	2nd Regiment West Virginia Volunteer Cavalry	Bvt. Brig. Gen. USV, March 13, 1865	February 6, 1867	
McFerran, John Courts	Colonel	Quartermaster, USA	Bvt. Brig. Gen. USA, March 13, 1865	July 25, 1866	
McGarry, Edward	Colonel	2nd Regiment California Volunteer Cavalry	Bvt. Brig. Gen. USV, March 13, 1865	July 23, 1866	
McGowan, John Encill	Lt. Colonel	1st Regiment U.S. Colored Heavy Artillery	Bvt. Brig. Gen. USV, March 13, 1865	July 23, 1866	
MacGregor, John Dunn	Colonel	4th Regiment New York Volunteer Infantry	Bvt. Brig. Gen. USV, March 13, 1865	July 26, 1866	
McGroarty, Stephen Joseph	Colonel	82nd Regiment Ohio Volunteer Infantry	Bvt. Brig. Gen. USV, May 1, 1865	March 12, 1866	
McIvor, James Patrick	Colonel	170th Regiment New York Volunteer Infantry	Bvt. Brig. Gen. USV, April 9, 1865; Bvt. Maj. Gen. USV, April 9, 1865	March 12, 1866; July 17, 1868	
Mackay, Andrew Jackson	Lt. Colonel	Quartermaster Dept., USV	Bvt. Brig. Gen. USV, March 13, 1865	March 12, 1866	
McKeever, Chauncey	Major	Asst. Adjutant Gen. USA	Bvt. Brig. Gen. USA, March 13, 1865	March 2, 1867	
McKenney, Thomas Irving	Major	Additional Aide-de-Camp, USV	Bvt. Brig. Gen. USV, March 13, 1865	March 12, 1866	
McKibbin, David Bell	Colonel	158th Regiment Pennsylvania Volunteer Infantry	Bvt. Brig. Gen. USV, March 13, 1865	March 12, 1866	
McKibbin, Gilbert Hunt	Captain	Asst. Adjutant Gen. USV	Bvt. Brig. Gen. USV, December 2, 1864	February 14, 1865	
McLaren, Robert Neill	Colonel	2nd Regiment Minnesota Volunteer Cavalry	Bvt. Brig. Gen. USV, December 14, 1865	April 10, 1866	
McLaughlen, Napoleon Bonaparte	Colonel	57th Regiment Massachusetts Volunteer Infantry	Bvt. Brig. Gen. USV, September 30, 1864; Bvt. Brig. Gen. USA, March 13, 1865	February 14, 1865; July 23, 1865	
McMahon, John	Colonel	188th Regiment New York Volunteer Infantry	Bvt. Brig. Gen. USV, June 30, 1865	April 10, 1866	
McMahon, Martin Thomas	Lt. Colonel	Asst. Adjutant Gen. USV	Bvt. Brig. Gen. USV, March 13, 1865; Bvt. Maj. Gen. USV, March 13, 1865	March 12, 1866; April 10, 1866	Medal of Honor
McMillen, William Linn	Colonel	95th Regiment Ohio Volunteer Infantry	Bvt. Brig. Gen. USV, December 16, 1864; Bvt. Maj. Gen. USV, March 13, 1865	February 14, 1865; March 2, 1867	
McNary, William H.	Lt. Colonel	158th Regiment New York Volunteer Infantry	Bvt. Brig. Gen. USV, March 13, 1865	March 12, 1866	
McNaught, Thomas Alexander	Colonel	59th Regiment Indiana Volunteer Infantry	Bvt. Brig. Gen. USV, August 4, 1865	March 12, 1866	
McNett, Andrew James	Lt. Colonel	141st Regiment New York Volunteer Infantry	Bvt. Brig. Gen. USV, July 28, 1866	February 6, 1867	
McNulta, John	Colonel	94th Regiment Illinois Volunteer Infantry	Bvt. Brig. Gen. USV, March 13, 1865	July 26, 1866	
McQuade, James	Colonel	14th Regiment New York Volunteer Infantry	Bvt. Brig. Gen. USV, March 13, 1865; Bvt. Maj. Gen. USV, March 13, 1865	February 21, 1867; March 2, 1867	
McQueen, Alexander G.	Lt. Colonel	1st Regiment Iowa Volunteer Cavalry	Bvt. Brig. Gen. USV, March 13, 1865	July 26, 1866	
McQuiston, John Craven	Colonel	123rd Regiment Indiana Volunteer Infantry	Bvt. Brig. Gen. USV, March 13, 1865	March 12, 1866	
McThomson, James	Lt. Colonel	107th Regiment Pennsylvania Volunteer Infantry	Bvt. Brig. Gen. USV, March 13, 1865	July 27, 1866	For Battle of Gettysburg where wounded
Macy, George Nelson	Colonel	20th Regiment Massachusetts Volunteer Infantry	Bvt. Brig. Gen. USV, August 14, 1864; Bvt. Maj. Gen. USV, April 9, 1865	February 20, 1865; March 12, 1866	
Madill, Henry John	Colonel	141st Regiment Pennsylvania Volunteer Infantry	Bvt. Brig. Gen. USV, December 2, 1864; Bvt. Maj. Gen. USV, March 13, 1865	February 14, 1865; March 12, 1866	
Magee, David Wood	Colonel	86th Regiment Illinois Volunteer Infantry	Bvt. Brig. Gen. USV, March 13, 1865	March 12, 1866	
Malloy, Adam Gale	Colonel	17th Regiment Wisconsin Volunteer Infantry	Bvt. Brig. Gen. USV, March 13, 1865	March 12, 1866	
Manderson, Charles Frederick	Colonel	19th Regiment Ohio Volunteer Infantry	Bvt. Brig. Gen. USV, March 13, 1865	March 12, 1866	
Mank, William G.	Lt. Colonel	8th Regiment U.S. Veteran Volunteer Infantry	Bvt. Brig. Gen. USV, December 8, 1865	April 10, 1866	
Mann, Orrin Lorentna	Lt. Colonel	39th Regiment Illinois Volunteer Infantry	Bvt. Brig. Gen. USV, March 13, 1865	March 12, 1866	
Manning, Stephen Hart	Captain	Quartermaster Dept., USV	Bvt. Brig. Gen. USV, March 13, 1865	February 21, 1867	
Mansfield, John	Colonel	12th Regiment Veteran Reserve Corps	Bvt. Brig. Gen. USV, March 13, 1865	July 23, 1867	
Markoe, John	Lt. Colonel	71st Regiment Pennsylvania Volunteer Infantry	Bvt. Brig. Gen. USV, March 13, 1865	July 23, 1867	
Marple, William Warren	Colonel	34th Regiment U.S. Colored Infantry	Bvt. Brig. Gen. USV, March 13, 1865	April 26, 1866	
Marshall, Elisha Gaylord	Colonel	14th Regiment New York Volunteer Light Artillery	Bvt. Brig. Gen. USV, December 13, 1862; Bvt. Brig. Gen. USA, March 13, 1865; Bvt. Maj. Gen. USV, March 13, 1865	February 21, 1867; July 19, 1867; July 19, 1867	
Marshall, William Rainey	Colonel	7th Regiment Minnesota Volunteer Infantry	Bvt. Brig. Gen. USV, March 13, 1865	March 12, 1866	
Martin, James Stewart	Colonel	111th Regiment Illinois Volunteer Infantry	Bvt. Brig. Gen. USV, February 28, 1865	March 9, 1865	
Martin, John Alexander	Colonel	8th Regiment Kansas Volunteer Infantry	Bvt. Brig. Gen. USV, March 13, 1865	April 10, 1866	
Martin, William Henry	Lt. Colonel	93rd Regiment Ohio Volunteer Infantry	Bvt. Brig. Gen. USV, June 8, 1865	May 18, 1866	
Mason, Edwin Cooley	Colonel	176th Regiment Ohio Volunteer Infantry	Bvt. Brig. Gen. USV, June 3, 1865	March 12, 1866	
Mather, Thomas S.	Colonel	2nd Regiment Illinois Volunteer Light Artillery	Bvt. Brig. Gen. USV, September 28, 1865	March 12, 1866	
Mathews, Joseph Ard	Colonel	205th Regiment Pennsylvania Volunteer Infantry	Bvt. Brig. Gen. USV, April 2, 1865	March 12, 1866	
Mathews, Salmon S.	Lt. Colonel	5th Regiment Michigan Volunteer Infantry	Bvt. Brig. Gen. USV, March 13, 1865	February 14, 1868	
Mattocks, Charles Porter	Colonel	17th Regiment Maine Volunteer Infantry	Bvt. Brig. Gen. USV, March 13, 1865	March 2, 1867	Medal of Honor for Battle of Sailor's Creek; Served as brigadier general during the Spanish–American War
Maxwell, Norman Jay	Colonel	100th Regiment Pennsylvania Volunteer Infantry	Bvt. Brig. Gen. USV, April 18, 1865	February 14, 1868	
Maxwell, Obediah Craig	Lt. Colonel	2nd Regiment Ohio Volunteer Infantry	Bvt. Brig. Gen. USV, March 13, 1865	April 10, 1866	
May, Dwight	Colonel	12th Regiment Michigan Volunteer Infantry	Bvt. Brig. Gen. USV, October 24, 1865	March 12, 1866	
Maynadier, Henry Eveleth	Major	12th Regiment U.S. Infantry	Bvt. Brig. Gen. USV, March 13, 1865; Bvt. Maj. Gen. USV, March 13, 1865	July 23, 1866; July 23, 1866	
Maynadier, William	Colonel	Ordnance Dept., USA	Bvt. Brig. Gen. USA, March 13, 1865	July 23, 1866	
Mehringer, John	Colonel	91st Regiment Indiana Volunteer Infantry	Bvt. Brig. Gen. USV, March 13, 1865	March 12, 1866	
Merchant, Charles Spencer	Colonel	4th Regiment U.S. Artillery	Bvt. Brig. Gen. USA, March 13, 1865	July 26, 1866	
Merrill, Lewis	Colonel	2nd Regiment Missouri Volunteer Cavalry	Bvt. Brig. Gen. USV, March 13, 1865	March 12, 1866	Resigned as Regular Army Lt. Colonel, 1886; Also Bvt. Brig. Gen. USA, 1890
Mersy, August	Colonel	9th Regiment Illinois Volunteer Infantry	Bvt. Brig. Gen. USV, March 13, 1865	April 10, 1866	
Messer, John	Lt. Colonel	101st Regiment Ohio Volunteer Infantry	Bvt. Brig. Gen. USV, March 13, 1865	July 19, 1867	
Meyer, Edward Seraphim	Major	5th Regiment U.S. Veteran Volunteer Infantry	Bvt. Brig. Gen. USV, March 13, 1865	April 10, 1865	
Michie, Peter Smith	Lt. Colonel	Asst. Inspector Gen. USV	Bvt. Brig. Gen. USV, January 1, 1865	March 10, 1865	
Michler, Nathaniel	Major	Corps of Engineers, USA	Bvt. Brig. Gen. USA, April 2, 1865	July 28, 1866	
Miller, Abram O.	Colonel	72nd Regiment Indiana Volunteer Infantry	Bvt. Brig. Gen. USV, March 13, 1865	March 12, 1866	
Miller, Madison	Colonel	18th Regiment Missouri Volunteer Infantry	Bvt. Brig. Gen. USV, March 13, 1865	February 14, 1868	
Miller, Morris Smith	Major	Quartermaster, USA	Bvt. Brig. Gen. USA, March 13, 1865	May 4, 1866	
Mills, James K.	Colonel	24th Regiment Missouri Volunteer Infantry	Bvt. Brig. Gen. USV, March 13, 1865	April 10, 1866	
Mills, Madison	Colonel	Medical Inspector Gen. USA	Bvt. Brig. Gen. USA, March 13, 1865	April 10, 1866	
Mindil, George Washington	Colonel	33rd Regiment New Jersey Volunteer Infantry	Bvt. Brig. Gen. USV, March 13, 1865; Bvt. Maj. Gen. USV, March 13, 1865	March 12, 1866; May 14, 1866	Medal of Honor
Minty, Robert Horatio George	Colonel	4th Regiment Michigan Volunteer Cavalry	Bvt. Brig. Gen. USV, March 13, 1865; Bvt. Maj. Gen. USV, March 13, 1865	March 12, 1866; July 23, 1866	
Mintzer, William M.	Colonel	53rd Regiment Pennsylvania Volunteer Infantry	Bvt. Brig. Gen. USV, March 13, 1865	April 10, 1866	
Mitchell, Grenville McNeel	Colonel	54th Regiment Illinois Volunteer Infantry	Bvt. Brig. Gen. USV, August 22, 1865	March 12, 1866	
Mitchell, William Galbraith	Major	Aide-de-Camp, USV	Bvt. Brig. Gen. USV, March 13, 1865	March 12, 1866	
Mix, Elisha	Colonel	8th Regiment Michigan Volunteer Cavalry	Bvt. Brig. Gen. USV, March 13, 1865	March 12, 1866	
Mizner, Henry Rutgeras	Colonel	14th Regiment Michigan Volunteer Infantry	Bvt. Brig. Gen. USV, March 13, 1865	April 10, 1866	
Mizner, John Kemp	Colonel	3rd Regiment Michigan Volunteer Cavalry	Bvt. Brig. Gen. USV, March 13, 1865	March 2, 1867	
Moffitt, Stephen	Lt. Colonel	96th Regiment New York Volunteer Infantry	Bvt. Brig. Gen. USV, March 13, 1865	April 19, 1866	
Molineux, Edward Leslie	Colonel	159th Regiment New York Volunteer Infantry	Bvt. Brig. Gen. USV, October 19, 1864; Bvt. Maj. Gen. USV, March 13, 1865	February 14, 1865; March 28, 1867	
Monroe, George Wood	Colonel	7th Regiment Kentucky Veteran Volunteer Infantry	Bvt. Brig. Gen. USV, March 13, 1865	April 26, 1866	
Montgomery, Milton	Colonel	25th Regiment Wisconsin Volunteer Infantry	Bvt. Brig. Gen. USV, March 13, 1865	March 12, 1866	
Moody, Granville	Colonel	74th Regiment Ohio Volunteer Infantry	Bvt. Brig. Gen. USV, March 13, 1865	July 23, 1867	
Moon, John Carter	Colonel	118th Regiment U.S. Colored Infantry	Bvt. Brig. Gen. USV, November 21, 1865	March 12, 1866	
Moonlight, Thomas	Colonel	11th Regiment Kansas Volunteer Cavalry	Bvt. Brig. Gen. USV, February 13, 1865	February 23, 1867	Appointed by President Lincoln.
Moor, August	Colonel	28th Regiment Ohio Volunteer Infantry	Bvt. Brig. Gen. USV, March 13, 1865	July 23, 1867	
Moore, David	Colonel	21st Regiment Missouri Volunteer Infantry	Bvt. Brig. Gen. USV, February 21, 1865	March 3, 1865	
Moore, Frederick William	Colonel	83rd Regiment Ohio Volunteer Infantry	Bvt. Brig. Gen. USV, March 26, 1865	April 12, 1866	
Moore, Jesse Hale	Colonel	115th Regiment Illinois Volunteer Infantry	Bvt. Brig. Gen. USV, May 15, 1865	April 12, 1866	
Moore, Jonathan Baker	Colonel	33rd Regiment Wisconsin Volunteer Infantry	Bvt. Brig. Gen. USV, March 26, 1865	March 12, 1866	
Moore, Marshall F.	Colonel	69th Ohio Volunteer Infantry	Bvt. Brig. Gen. USV, March 13, 1865; Bvt. Maj. Gen. USV, March 13, 1865	April 10, 1867; July 19, 1867	
Moore, Timothy Cummings	Lt. Colonel	34th Regiment New Jersey Volunteer Infantry	Bvt. Brig. Gen. USV, November 11, 1865	April 12, 1866	
Moore, Seymour Tredwell	Captain	Asst. Quartermaster, USA	Bvt. Brig. Gen. USA, March 13, 1865	July 18, 1868	
Morehead, Turner Gustavus	Colonel	106th Regiment Pennsylvania Volunteer Infantry	Bvt. Brig. Gen. USV, March 13, 1865	February 14, 1868	
Morgan, George Nelson	Colonel	2nd Regiment Veteran Reserve Corps	Bvt. Brig. Gen. USV, March 13, 1865	March 12, 1866	
Morgan, Michael Ryan	Lt. Colonel	Commissary Gen. of Subsistence Dept., USA	Bvt. Brig. Gen. USA, April 9, 1865	March 18, 1867	USMA, 1854. Retired as Regular Army Brigadier General, 1897.
Morgan, Thomas Jefferson	Colonel	14th Regiment U.S. Colored Infantry	Bvt. Brig. Gen. USV, March 13, 1865	April 10, 1866	
Morgan, William Henry	Colonel	3rd Regiment U.S. Veteran Volunteer Infantry	Bvt. Brig. Gen. USV, March 13, 1865	March 12, 1866	
Morgan, William Henry	Major	Asst. Adjutant Gen. USV	Bvt. Brig. Gen. USV, April 20, 1865	March 12, 1866	
Morrill, John	Colonel	64th Regiment Illinois Volunteer Infantry	Bvt. Brig. Gen. USV, March 13, 1865	March 12, 1866	
Morris, William Walton	Colonel	2nd Regiment U.S. Artillery	Bvt. Brig. Gen. USA, June 9, 1862; Bvt. Maj. Gen. USA, December 10, 1865	June 9, 1862; May 4, 1866	Bvt. Brig. Gen. nomination by Pres. Lincoln, April 30, 1862; Nomination to Bvt. Maj. Gen. was posthumously.
Morrison, David	Colonel	79th Regiment New York Volunteer Infantry	Bvt. Brig. Gen. USV, March 13, 1865	July 17, 1868	
Morrison, Joseph Johnson	Captain	3rd Regiment New York Volunteer Heavy Artillery	Bvt. Brig. Gen. USV, March 13, 1865	March 12, 1866	
Morrison, Pitcairn	Colonel	8th Regiment U.S. Infantry	Bvt. Brig. Gen. USA, March 13, 1865	July 26, 1866	
Morrow, Henry Andrew	Colonel	24th Regiment Michigan Volunteer Infantry	Bvt. Brig. Gen. USV, August 1, 1864; Bvt. Maj. Gen. USV, March 13, 1865	February 14, 1865; May 18, 1866	
Morse, Henry Bagg	Lt. Colonel	114th Regiment New York Volunteer Infantry	Bvt. Brig. Gen. USV, March 13, 1865	May 18, 1866	
Mott, Samuel Rolla	Lt. Colonel	57th Regiment Ohio Volunteer Infantry	Bvt. Brig. Gen. USV, March 13, 1865	March 12, 1866	
Mudgett, William S.	Colonel	80th Regiment U.S. Colored Infantry	Bvt. Brig. Gen. USV, March 13, 1865	April 10, 1866	
Mulcahy, Thomas	Lt. Colonel	139th Regiment New York Volunteer Infantry	Bvt. Brig. Gen. USV, March 13, 1865	March 2, 1867	
Mulford, John Elmer	Major	3rd Regiment New York Volunteer Infantry	Bvt. Brig. Gen. USV, July 4, 1864	March 10, 1865	
Mulholland, St Clair Augustin	Colonel	116th Regiment Pennsylvania Volunteer Infantry	Bvt. Brig. Gen. USV, March 13, 1865; Bvt. Maj. Gen. USV, March 13, 1865	May 18, 1866; February 16, 1869	Medal of Honor
Mulligan, James Adelbert	Colonel	23rd Regiment Illinois Volunteer Infantry	Bvt. Brig. Gen. USV, July 23, 1864	February 20, 1865	Killed at the Second Battle of Kernstown, Virginia (Winchester, Virginia), July 24, 1864. Posthumous brevet for Second Battle of Kernstown
Mundee, Charles	Major	Asst. Adjutant Gen. USV	Bvt. Brig. Gen. USV, April 2, 1865	March 12, 1866	
Murphy, John Kidd	Captain	Veteran Reserve Corps	Bvt. Brig. Gen. USV, March 13, 1865	July 26, 1866	
Murray, Benjamin Bixby	Lt. Colonel	15th Regiment Maine Volunteer Infantry	Bvt. Brig. Gen. USV, March 13, 1865	April 19, 1866	Also confirmed July 23, 1866
Murray, Edward	Lt. Colonel	5th Regiment New York Volunteer Heavy Artillery	Bvt. Brig. Gen. USV, March 13, 1865	July 23, 1866	
Murray, Eli Houston	Colonel	3rd Kentucky Cavalry Regiment	Bvt. Brig. Gen. USV, March 25, 1865	March 12, 1866	
Murray, John B.	Colonel	148th Regiment New York Volunteer Infantry	Bvt. Brig. Gen. USV, March 13, 1865	March 12, 1866	
Mussey, Reuben Delavan	Colonel	100th Regiment U.S. Colored Infantry	Bvt. Brig. Gen. USV, March 13, 1865	No record	No record of nomination and confirmation
Myer, Albert James	Major	Chief Signal Officer, USA	Bvt. Brig. Gen. USA, March 13, 1865	February 14, 1867	Appointed Brig. Gen. USA, June 16, 1880
Myers, Frederick	Major	Quartermaster, USA	Bvt. Brig. Gen. USA, March 13, 1865	July 25, 1866	
Myers, George Ranney	Colonel	18th Regiment New York Volunteer Infantry	Bvt. Brig. Gen. USV, March 13, 1865	May 18, 1866	
Myers, William	Colonel	Additional Aide-de-Camp, USV	Bvt. Brig. Gen. USV, March 13, 1865	March 12, 1866	

== Union brevet generals; lower actual, substantive grade ==
=== N ===
Name	Highest actual grade	Unit	Brevet grade, rank date	Date confirmed	Notes, other dates
Nase, Adam	Major	15th Regiment Illinois Volunteer Infantry	Bvt. Brig. Gen. USV, March 13, 1865	April 10, 1866	Lost right foot at Battle of Shiloh
Neafie, Allfred	Lt. Colonel	156th Regiment New York Volunteer Infantry	Bvt. Brig. Gen. USV, March 13, 1865	March 24, 1868	For gallantry at the Third Battle of Winchester, September 19, 1864
Neff, Andrew Jackson	Lt. Colonel	84th Regiment Indiana Volunteer Infantry	Bvt. Brig. Gen. USV, March 13, 1865	March 28, 1867	
Neff, George Washington	Colonel	88th Regiment Ohio Volunteer Infantry	Bvt. Brig. Gen. USV, March 13, 1865	April 10, 1866	Attended Woodward College
Neide, Horace	Lt. Colonel	13th Regiment Veteran Reserve Corps	Bvt. Brig. Gen. USV, March 13, 1865	July 26, 1866	For Battles of Mechanicsville, Gaines Mill, Glendale; Retired as Regular Army captain, 1893
Nettleton, Alvred Bayard	Lt. Colonel	2nd Regiment Ohio Volunteer Cavalry	Bvt. Brig. Gen. USV, March 13, 1865	May 18, 1866	Oberlin College graduate; Asst. Sec. of Treasury, 1890–1893
Newberry, Walter Cass	Colonel	24th Regiment New York Volunteer Cavalry	Bvt. Brig. Gen. USV, March 31, 1865	March 12, 1866	
Newport, Reece Marshall	Colonel	Quartermaster Dept., USV	Bvt. Brig. Gen. USV, March 13, 1865	February 21, 1867	
Nichols, George F.	Colonel	118th Regiment New York Volunteer Infantry	Bvt. Brig. Gen. USV, March 13, 1865	July 26, 1866	
Nichols, George Sylvester	Colonel	9th Regiment New York Volunteer Cavalry	Bvt. Brig. Gen. USV, March 13, 1865	February 21, 1867	
Nichols, William Augustus	Colonel	Asst. Adjutant Gen. USA	Bvt. Brig. Gen. USA September 24, 1864; Bvt. Maj. Gen. USA, March 13, 1865	March 9, 1865; March 28, 1867	Bvt. Brig. Gen. nomination by Pres. Lincoln, February 21, 1865
Niles, Nathaniel	Colonel	130th Regiment Illinois Volunteer Infantry	Bvt. Brig. Gen. USV, March 13, 1865	July 19, 1867	
Noble, John Willock	Colonel	3rd Regiment Iowa Volunteer Cavalry	Bvt. Brig. Gen. USV, March 13, 1865	July 23, 1866	
Noble, William H.	Colonel	17th Regiment Connecticut Volunteer Infantry	Bvt. Brig. Gen. USV, March 13, 1865	March 12, 1866	
Northcott, Robert Sanders	Lt. Colonel	12th Regiment West Virginia Volunteer Infantry	Bvt. Brig. Gen. USV, March 13, 1865	March 12, 1866	
Norton, Charles Benjamin	Lt. Colonel	Quartermaster Dept., USV	Bvt. Brig. Gen. USV, March 13, 1865	February 16, 1869	
Noyes, Edward Follansbee	Colonel	39th Regiment Ohio Volunteer Infantry	Bvt. Brig. Gen. USV, March 13, 1865	March 12, 1866	Left leg amputated Governor of Ohio (1872-1874)
Nugent, Robert	Colonel	69th Regiment New York Volunteer Infantry	Bvt. Brig. Gen. USV, March 13, 1865	March 12, 1866	
Nye, George Henry	Major	29th Regiment Maine Volunteer Infantry	Bvt. Brig. Gen. USV, October 29, 1864; Bvt. Maj. Gen. USV, March 13, 1865	March 12, 1866; July 23, 1866	

== Union brevet generals; lower actual, substantive grade ==
=== O ===
Name	Highest actual grade	Unit	Brevet grade, rank date	Date confirmed	Notes, other dates
O'Beirne, James Rowan	Major	Veteran Reserve Corps	Bvt. Brig. Gen. USV, September 26, 1865	February 16, 1869	Medal of Honor
O'Brien, George Morgan	Major	7th Regiment Iowa Volunteer Cavalry	Bvt. Brig. Gen. USV, March 13, 1865	April 10, 1866	
O'Dowd, John	Colonel	181st Regiment Ohio Volunteer Infantry	Bvt. Brig. Gen. USV, March 13, 1865	July 23, 1866	
Oakes, James	Lt. Colonel	4th Regiment U.S. Cavalry	Bvt. Brig. Gen. USA, March 13, 1865	July 25, 1866	USMA graduate, 1846; Mexican–American War veteran; brevet for recruitment of armies retired Regular Army colonel, 1879
Oley, John H.	Colonel	7th Regiment West Virginia Volunteer Cavalry	Bvt. Brig. Gen. USV, March 13, 1865	March 12, 1866	
Oliphant, Samuel Duncan	Colonel	14th Regiment Veteran Reserve Corps	Bvt. Brig. Gen. USV, June 27, 1865	March 12, 1866	
Oliver, Paul Ambrose	Captain	5th Regiment New York Volunteer Infantry	Bvt. Brig. Gen. USV, March 8, 1865	March 10, 1865	Medal of Honor
Olmsted, William Adams	Colonel	59th Regiment New York Volunteer Infantry	Bvt. Brig. Gen. USV, April 9, 1865	March 12, 1865	
Ordway, Albert	Major	24th Regiment Massachusetts Volunteer Infantry	Bvt. Brig. Gen. USV, March 13, 1865	May 18, 1866	
Osband, Embury D.	Colonel	3rd Regiment U.S. Colored Cavalry	Bvt. Brig. Gen. USV, October 5, 1864	February 14, 1865	
Osborn, Francis Augustus	Colonel	24th Regiment Massachusetts Volunteer Infantry	Bvt. Brig. Gen. USV, March 13, 1865	July 17, 1868	
Otis, Calvin Nicholas	Lt. Colonel	100th Regiment New York Volunteer Infantry	Bvt. Brig. Gen. USV, March 13, 1865	April 16, 1867	
Otis, Elwell Stephen	Lt. Colonel	140th Regiment New York Volunteer Infantry	Bvt. Brig. Gen. USV, March 13, 1865	March 12, 1866	Retired as Regular Army Brig. Gen., 1902; Later also Maj. Gen. of Volunteers and of Regulars (ret.)
Otis, John Lord	Colonel	10th Regiment Connecticut Volunteer Infantry	Bvt. Brig. Gen. USV, March 13, 1865	July 23, 1866	

== Union brevet generals; lower actual, substantive grade ==
=== P ===
Name	Highest actual grade	Unit	Brevet grade, rank date	Date confirmed	Notes, other dates
Packard, Jasper	Colonel	128th Regiment Indiana Volunteer Infantry	Bvt. Brig. Gen. USV, March 13, 1865	April 10, 1866	
Painter, William	Major	Additional Aide-de-Camp, USV	Bvt. Brig. Gen. USV, March 13, 1865	March 2, 1867	
Palfrey, Francis Winthrop	Colonel	20th Regiment Massachusetts Volunteer Infantry	Bvt. Brig. Gen. USV, March 13, 1865	May 18, 1866	
Palfrey, John Carver	Lt. Colonel	Asst. Inspector Gen. USA	Bvt. Brig. Gen. USA, March 26, 1865	February 23, 1867	
Palmer, Oliver Hazard	Colonel	108th Regiment New York Volunteer Infantry	Bvt. Brig. Gen. USV, March 13, 1865	April 10, 1866	
Palmer, William Jackson	Colonel	15th Regiment Pennsylvania Volunteer Cavalry	Bvt. Brig. Gen. USV, November 6, 1864	March 10, 1865	Medal of Honor
Pardee, Ario Jr.	Colonel	147th Regiment Pennsylvania Volunteer Infantry	Bvt. Brig. Gen. USV, January 12, 1865	February 14, 1865	
Pardee, Don Albert	Lt. Colonel	42nd Regiment Ohio Volunteer Infantry	Bvt. Brig. Gen. USV, March 13, 1865	July 27, 1866	
Park, Sidney Wesley	Colonel	2nd Regiment New York Volunteer Infantry	Bvt. Brig. Gen. USV, March 13, 1865	March 28, 1867	
Parker, Ely Samuel	Lt. Colonel	Military Secretary to Lt. Gen. U. S. Grant	Bvt. Brig. Gen. USV, April 9, 1865; Bvt. Brig. Gen. USA, March 2, 1867	March 13, 1867; February 14, 1867	Possible error in source for second brevet? 1868? Resigned as Regular Army Colonel, 1869
Parkhurst, John Gibson	Colonel	9th Regiment Michigan Volunteer Infantry	Bvt. Brig. Gen. USV, May 22, 1865	March 12, 1868	
Parrish, Charles Sherman	Colonel	130th Regiment Indiana Volunteer Infantry	Bvt. Brig. Gen. USV, March 13, 1865	April 10, 1866	
Parrott, James Corner	Lt. Colonel	7th Regiment Iowa Volunteer Infantry	Bvt. Brig. Gen. USV, March 13, 1865	July 26, 1866	
Parry, Augustus Commodore	Colonel	47th Regiment Ohio Volunteer Infantry	Bvt. Brig. Gen. USV, March 13, 1865	March 12, 1866	
Partridge, Benjamin Franklin	Colonel	16th Regiment Michigan Volunteer Infantry	Bvt. Brig. Gen. USV, March 31, 1865	March 12, 1866	
Partridge, Frederick William	Lt. Colonel	13th Regiment Illinois Volunteer Infantry	Bvt. Brig. Gen. USV, March 13, 1865	July 26, 1866	
Pattee, John	Lt. Colonel	7th Regiment Iowa Volunteer Cavalry	Bvt. Brig. Gen. USV, March 13, 1865	April 26, 1866	
Pattee, Joseph B.	Lt. Colonel	190th Regiment Pennsylvania Volunteer Infantry	Bvt. Brig. Gen. USV, April 9, 1865	March 12, 1866	
Patten, Henry Lyman	Major	20th Regiment Massachusetts Volunteer Infantry	Bvt. Brig. Gen. USV, March 13, 1865	July 19, 1867	
Patterson, Joab Nelson	Lt. Colonel	2nd Regiment New Hampshire Volunteer Infantry	Bvt. Brig. Gen. USV, March 13, 1865	April 10, 1866	
Patterson, Robert Emmet	Colonel	115th Regiment Pennsylvania Volunteer Infantry	Bvt. Brig. Gen. USV, March 13, 1865	April 16, 1867	
Patterson, Robert Franklin	Lt. Colonel	29th Regiment Iowa Volunteer Infantry	Bvt. Brig. Gen. USV, March 26, 1865	April 10, 1866	
Payne, Eugene Beauharnais	Lt. Colonel	37th Regiment Illinois Volunteer Infantry	Bvt. Brig. Gen. USV, March 13, 1865	March 2, 1867	
Payne, Oliver Hazard	Colonel	124th Regiment Ohio Volunteer Infantry	Bvt. Brig. Gen. USV, March 13, 1865	July 23, 1866	
Pearce, John Stoneman	Lt. Colonel	98th Regiment Ohio Volunteer Infantry	Bvt. Brig. Gen. USV, March 13, 1865	July 27, 1866	
Pearsall, Uri Balcom	Lt. Colonel	99th U.S. Colored Infantry	Bvt. Brig. Gen. USV, March 13, 1865	April 10, 1866	
Pearson, Alfred Lawrence	Colonel	155th Regiment Pennsylvania Volunteer Infantry	Bvt. Brig. Gen. USV, September 30, 1864; Bvt. Maj. Gen. USV, May 1, 1865	February 14, 1865; March 12, 1866	
Pearson, Robert Newton	Lt. Colonel	31st Regiment Illinois Volunteer Infantry	Bvt. Brig. Gen. USV, March 13, 1865	March 12, 1866	
Pease, Phineas	Colonel	49th Regiment Illinois Volunteer Infantry	Bvt. Brig. Gen. USV, March 13, 1865	July 17, 1868	
Pease, William Russell	Colonel	117th Regiment New York Volunteer Infantry	Bvt. Brig. Gen. USV, March 13, 1865	April 20, 1867	
Peck, Frank Henry	Lt. Colonel	12th Regiment Connecticut Volunteer Infantry	Bvt. Brig. Gen. USV, September 19, 1864	March 24, 1868	Mortally wounded at Third Battle of Winchester
Peck, Lewis Mead	Colonel	173rd Regiment New York Volunteer Infantry	Bvt. Brig. Gen. USV, March 13, 1865; Bvt. Maj. Gen. USV, March 13, 1865	April 10, 1866; July 19, 1867	
Peirson, Charles Lawrence	Colonel	39th Regiment Massachusetts Volunteer Infantry	Bvt. Brig. Gen. USV, March 13, 1865	April 10, 1866	
Pelouze, Louis Henry	Major	Asst. Adjutant Gen. USA	Bvt. Brig. Gen. USA, March 13, 1865	July 27, 1866	
Pennington, Alexander Cummings McWhorter	Colonel	3rd Regiment New Jersey Volunteer Cavalry	Bvt. Brig. Gen. USV, July 15, 1865	March 12, 1866	Retired as Regular Army Brig. Gen., 1899
PerLee, Samuel R.	Colonel	114th Regiment New York Volunteer Infantry	Bvt. Brig. Gen. USV, March 13, 1865	March 12, 1866	
Perkins, Henry Welles	Lt. Colonel	Asst. Adjutant Gen. USV	Bvt. Brig. Gen. USV, March 13, 1865	March 12, 1866	
Perry, Alexander James	Colonel	Quartermaster Dept., USV	Bvt. Brig. Gen. USA, March 13, 1865	May 4, 1866	
Phelps, Charles Edward	Colonel	7th Regiment Maryland Volunteer Infantry	Bvt. Brig. Gen. USV, March 13, 1865	May 18, 1866	Medal of Honor
Phelps, John Elisha	Colonel	2nd Regiment Arkansas Volunteer Cavalry	Bvt. Brig. Gen. USV, March 13, 1865	March 12, 1866	
Phelps, Walter Jr.	Colonel	22nd Regiment New York Volunteer Infantry	Bvt. Brig. Gen. USV, March 13, 1865	July 26, 1866	
Phillips, Jesse J.	Lt. Colonel	9th Regiment Illinois Volunteer Infantry	Bvt. Brig. Gen. USV, March 13, 1865	March 12, 1866	
Pickett, Josiah	Colonel	25th Regiment Massachusetts Volunteer Infantry	Bvt. Brig. Gen. USV, June 3, 1864	March 24, 1868	
Pierce, Francis Edwin	Lt. Colonel	108th Regiment New York Volunteer Infantry	Bvt. Brig. Gen. USV, March 13, 1865	April 10, 1866	
Pierson, John Frederick	Colonel	1st Regiment New York Volunteer Infantry	Bvt. Brig. Gen. USV, March 13, 1865	May 18, 1866	
Pierson, William Seward	Lt. Colonel	128th Regiment Ohio Volunteer Infantry	Bvt. Brig. Gen. USV, March 13, 1865	July 23, 1866	
Pinckney, Joseph Conselyea	Captain	Commissary Gen. of Subsistence Dept., USV	Bvt. Brig. Gen. USV, March 13, 1865	April 10, 1866	
Pinto, Francis Effingham	Colonel	32nd Regiment New York Volunteer Infantry	Bvt. Brig. Gen. USV, March 13, 1865	July 23, 1866	
Plaisted, Harris Merrill	Colonel	11th Regiment Maine Volunteer Infantry	Bvt. Brig. Gen. USV, February 21, 1865; Bvt. Maj. Gen. USV, March 13, 1865	March 3, 1865; March 2, 1867	Bvt. Brig. Gen. nomination by Pres. Lincoln, February 22, 1865
Platner, John S.	Colonel	1st Regiment New York Volunteer Veteran Cavalry	Bvt. Brig. Gen. USV, March 13, 1865	March 12, 1866	
Pleasants, Henry Clay	Lt. Colonel	48th Regiment Pennsylvania Volunteer Infantry	Bvt. Brig. Gen. USV, March 13, 1865	March 12, 1866	
Pollock, Samuel McLean	Colonel	6th Regiment Iowa Volunteer Cavalry	Bvt. Brig. Gen. USV, March 13, 1865	February 14, 1868	
Pomutz, George	Lt. Colonel	15th Regiment Iowa Volunteer Infantry	Bvt. Brig. Gen. USV, March 13, 1865	May 18, 1866	
Pope, Edmund Mann	Colonel	8th Regiment New York Volunteer Cavalry	Bvt. Brig. Gen. USV, March 13, 1865	March 13, 1866	
Porter, Horace	Lt. Colonel	Additional Aide-de-Camp, USA	Bvt. Brig. Gen. USA, March 13, 1865	July 23, 1866	Medal of Honor; Retired as Regular Army Colonel, 1873
Porter, Samuel Alfred	Colonel	123rd Regiment U.S. Colored Infantry	Bvt. Brig. Gen. USV, March 13, 1865	March 12, 1866	
Post, Philip Sidney	Colonel	59th Regiment Illinois Volunteer Infantry	Bvt. Brig. Gen. USV, December 16, 1864	March 11, 1865	Medal of Honor; Nominated by Pres. Lincoln, March 11, 1865
Potter, Carroll Hagedorn	Major	Asst. Adjutant Gen. USV	Bvt. Brig. Gen. USV, March 13, 1865	February 6, 1867	
Potter, Joseph Adams	Colonel	Quartermaster, USA	Bvt. Brig. Gen. USA, March 13, 1865	July 25, 1866	
Powell, Eugene	Lt. Colonel	66th Regiment Ohio Volunteer Infantry	Bvt. Brig. Gen. USV, March 13, 1865	March 12, 1866	
Powers, Charles James	Colonel	108th Regiment New York Volunteer Infantry	Bvt. Brig. Gen. USV, March 13, 1865; Bvt. Maj. Gen. USV, March 13, 1865	March 12, 1866; March 28, 1867	
Pratt, Benjamin Franklin	Lt. Colonel	36th Regiment U.S. Colored Infantry	Bvt. Brig. Gen. USV, March 13, 1865	March 28, 1867	
Prescott, George Lincoln	Colonel	32nd Regiment Massachusetts Volunteer Infantry	Bvt. Brig. Gen. USV, June 18, 1864	July 19, 1867	Posthumous. Mortally wounded at Petersburg, Virginia, June 18, 1864
Preston, Simon Manley	Colonel	58th Regiment U.S. Colored Infantry	Bvt. Brig. Gen. USV, December 30, 1865	April 10, 1866	
Prevost, Charles Mallet	Colonel	16th Regiment Veteran Reserve Corps	Bvt. Brig. Gen. USV, March 13, 1865	April 13, 1867	
Price, Francis	Colonel	7th Regiment New Jersey Volunteer Infantry	Bvt. Brig. Gen. USV, March 13, 1865	March 12, 1866	
Price, Richard Butler	Colonel	2nd Regiment Pennsylvania Volunteer Cavalry	Bvt. Brig. Gen. USV, March 13, 1865	April 10, 1867	
Price, Samuel Woodson	Colonel	21st Regiment Kentucky Volunteer Infantry	Bvt. Brig. Gen. USV, March 13, 1865	March 28, 1867	
Price, William Redwood	Major	Asst. Adjutant Gen. USV	Bvt. Brig. Gen. USV, March 13, 1865	March 12, 1866	Retired as Regular Army Lt. Colonel, 1874
Prime, Frederick Edward	Major	Corps of Engineers, USA	Bvt. Brig. Gen. USA, March 13, 1865	March 2, 1867	Commission not issued.
Pritchard, Benjamin Dudley	Lt. Colonel	4th Regiment Michigan Volunteer Cavalry	Bvt. Brig. Gen. USV, May 10, 1865	March 12, 1866	
Proudfit, James Kerr	Colonel	12th Regiment Wisconsin Volunteer Infantry	Bvt. Brig. Gen. USV, March 13, 1865	March 12, 1866	
Pugh, Isaac Campbell	Colonel	41st Regiment Illinois Volunteer Infantry	Bvt. Brig. Gen. USV, March 10, 1865	March 11, 1865	
Pulford, John	Colonel	5th Regiment Michigan Volunteer Infantry	Bvt. Brig. Gen. USV, March 13, 1865	March 12, 1866	

== Union brevet generals; lower actual, substantive grade ==
=== Q ===
Name	Highest actual grade	Unit	Brevet grade, rank date	Date confirmed	Notes, other dates
Quincy, Samuel Miller	Colonel	73rd Regiment U.S. Colored Infantry	Bvt. Brig. Gen. USV, March 13, 1865	April 10, 1866	Harvard College graduate; lawyer

== Union brevet generals; lower actual, substantive grade ==
=== R ===
Name	Highest actual grade	Unit	Brevet grade, rank date	Date confirmed	Notes, other dates
Ramsey, John	Lt. Colonel	8th Regiment New Jersey Volunteer Infantry	Bvt. Brig. Gen. USV, December 2, 1864; Bvt. Maj. Gen. USV, March 13, 1865	February 14, 1865; March 12, 1866	
Randall, George W.	Major	30th Regiment Maine Volunteer Infantry	Bvt. Brig. Gen. USV, March 13, 1865	March 24, 1868	
Randol, Alanson Merwin	Colonel	2nd Regiment New York Volunteer Cavalry	Bvt. Brig. Gen. USV, June 24, 1865	March 12, 1866	USMA 1860; Died as Regular Army Major, 1887
Ratliff, Robert Wilson	Colonel	12th Regiment Ohio Volunteer Cavalry	Bvt. Brig. Gen. USV, March 13, 1865	April 10, 1866	
Raynolds, William Franklin	Major	Corps of Engineers, USA	Bvt. Brig. Gen. USA, March 13, 1865	March 2, 1867	USMA 1843; Retired as Regular Army Colonel, 1884
Raynor, William Henry	Colonel	56th Regiment Ohio Volunteer Infantry	Bvt. Brig. Gen. USV, March 13, 1865	July 23, 1866	
Read, Samuel Tyler	Major	3rd Regiment Massachusetts Volunteer Cavalry	Bvt. Brig. Gen. USV, March 13, 1865	April 13, 1867	Commission not issued
Read, Theodore	Major	Asst. Adjutant Gen. USV	Bvt. Brig. Gen. USV, September 29, 1864	March 10, 1865	Nominated by Pres. Lincoln March 9, 1865
Reese, Chauncey B.	Captain	Corps of Engineers, USA	Bvt. Brig. Gen. USA, March 13, 1865	July 25, 1866	
Reeve, Isaac Van Duzer	Colonel	13th Regiment U.S. Infantry	Bvt. Brig. Gen. USA, March 13, 1865	July 23, 1868	USMA 1835
Remick, David	Lt. Colonel	Commissary Gen. of Subsistence Dept., USV	Bvt. Brig. Gen. USV, March 13, 1865	July 23, 1866	
Reno, Marcus Albert	Colonel	12th Regiment Pennsylvania Volunteer Cavalry	Bvt. Brig. Gen. USV, March 13, 1865	March 12, 1866	USMA 1857
Revere, Paul Joseph	Colonel	20th Regiment Massachusetts Volunteer Infantry	Bvt. Brig. Gen. USV, July 2, 1863	July 23, 1868	Posthumous; mortally wounded at Battle of Gettysburg, July 2, 1863; Grandson of Paul Revere
Revere, William H. Jr.	Colonel	107th Regiment U.S. Colored Infantry	Bvt. Brig. Gen. USV, August 17, 1865	March 12, 1866	Commission not issued
Reynolds, Joseph Smith	Lt. Colonel	64th Regiment Illinois Volunteer Infantry	Bvt. Brig. Gen. USV, July 11, 1865	Not listed by Eicher	
Richardson, Hollon	Lt. Colonel	7th Regiment Wisconsin Volunteer Infantry	Bvt. Brig. Gen. USV, March 13, 1865	March 12, 1866	
Richardson, William Pitt	Colonel	25th Regiment Ohio Volunteer Infantry	Bvt. Brig. Gen. USV, December 7, 1864	February 14, 1865	Nominated by Pres. Lincoln, December 12, 1864
Richmond, Lewis	Lt. Colonel	Asst. Adjutant Gen. USV	Bvt. Brig. Gen. USV, March 13, 1865	March 12, 1866	
Riggin, John Jr.	Colonel	Additional Aide-de-Camp, USV	Bvt. Brig. Gen. USV, March 13, 1865	July 27, 1866	
Rinaker, John Irving	Colonel	122nd Regiment Illinois Volunteer Infantry	Bvt. Brig. Gen. USV, March 13, 1865	March 12, 1866	
Ripley, Edward Hastings	Colonel	9th Regiment Vermont Infantry Volunteers	Bvt. Brig. Gen. USV, August 1, 1864	February 14, 1865	Nominated by Pres. Lincoln January 31, 1865
Ripley, Theodore Alexander	Captain	14th Regiment New Hampshire Volunteer Infantry	Bvt. Brig. Gen. USV, March 13, 1865	March 27, 1867	
Risdon, Orlando Charles	Colonel	53rd Regiment U.S. Colored Infantry	Bvt. Brig. Gen. USV, March 13, 1865	July 23, 1866	
Ritchie, John	Colonel	2nd Regiment Kansas Indian Home Guard	Bvt. Brig. Gen. USV, February 21, 1865	March 3, 1865	Nominated by Pres. Lincoln February 22, 1865; not issued
Robbins, Walter Raleigh	Major	1st Regiment New Jersey Volunteer Cavalry	Bvt. Brig. Gen. USV, March 13, 1865	March 30, 1867	
Roberts, Charles Wentworth	Colonel	2nd Regiment Maine Volunteer Infantry	Bvt. Brig. Gen. USV, March 13, 1865	April 10, 1866	
Roberts, Joseph	Colonel	3rd Regiment Pennsylvania Volunteer Heavy Artillery	Bvt. Brig. Gen. USA, March 13, 1865; Bvt. Brig. Gen. USV, April 9, 1865	March 12, 1866	
Roberts, Samuel Henry	Colonel	139th Regiment New York Volunteer Infantry	Bvt. Brig. Gen. USV, October 28, 1864	February 14, 1865	Nominated by Pres. Lincoln, February 7, 1865
Robertson, James Madison	Captain	2nd Regiment U.S. Artillery	Bvt. Brig. Gen. USA, March 13, 1865	July 25, 1866	Retired as Regular Army Major, 1879
Robeson, William P. Jr.	Lt. Colonel	3rd Regiment New Jersey Volunteer Cavalry	Bvt. Brig. Gen. USV, March 13, 1865	May 18, 1866	
Robinson, George Dorgue	Colonel	97th Regiment U.S. Colored Infantry	Bvt. Brig. Gen. USV, March 13, 1865	April 10, 1866	
Robinson, Henry Lee	Captain	Quartermaster Dept., USV	Bvt. Brig. Gen. USV, March 13, 1865	March 12, 1866	
Robinson, Milton Stapp	Colonel	75th Regiment Indiana Volunteer Infantry	Bvt. Brig. Gen. USV, March 13, 1865	April 19, 1866	
Robinson, William Andrew	Captain	77th Regiment Pennsylvania Volunteer Infantry	Bvt. Brig. Gen. USV, March 13, 1865	February 21, 1867	
Robison, John K.	Lt. Colonel	16th Regiment Pennsylvania Volunteer Cavalry	Bvt. Brig. Gen. USV, March 13, 1865	April 8, 1867	
Rockwell, Alfred Perkins	Colonel	6th Regiment Connecticut Volunteer Infantry	Bvt. Brig. Gen. USV, March 13, 1865	July 27, 1868	
Rodenbough, Theophilus Francis	Captain	18th Regiment Pennsylvania Volunteer Cavalry	Bvt. Brig. Gen. USV, March 13, 1865; Bvt. Brig. Gen. USA, March 13, 1865	March 12, 1866; July 18, 1868	Medal of Honor; Brigadier General, retired
Rodgers, Hiram C.	Major	Asst. Adjutant Gen. USV	Bvt. Brig. Gen. USV, March 13, 1865	March 12, 1866	
Rodman, Thomas Jackson	Major	Ordnance Dept., USA	Bvt. Brig. Gen. USV, March 13, 1865	July 25, 1866	Died as Regular Army Lieutenant Colonel, 1871.
Rogers, George	Lt. Colonel	4th Regiment U.S. Colored Infantry	Bvt. Brig. Gen. USV, March 13, 1865	April 10, 1866	
Rogers, George Clarke	Colonel	15th Regiment Illinois Volunteer Infantry	Bvt. Brig. Gen. USV, March 13, 1865	March 12, 1866	
Rogers, Horatio Jr.	Colonel	2nd Regiment Rhode Island Volunteer Infantry	Bvt. Brig. Gen. USV, March 13, 1865	February 21, 1867	
Rogers, James Clarence	Colonel	123rd Regiment New York Volunteer Infantry	Bvt. Brig. Gen. USV, March 13, 1865	March 12, 1867	
Rogers, William Findlay	Colonel	21st Regiment New York Volunteer Infantry	Bvt. Brig. Gen. USV, March 13, 1865	July 27, 1866	
Roome, Charles	Colonel	37th Regiment New York State Militia	Bvt. Brig. Gen. USV, March 13, 1865	March 2, 1867	
Root, Adrian Rowe	Colonel	94th Regiment New York Volunteer Infantry	Bvt. Brig. Gen. USV, March 2, 1865; Bvt. Maj. Gen. USV, March 13, 1865	March 9, 1865; March 12, 1866	Bvt. Brig. Gen. nomination by Pres. Lincoln, March 2, 1865
Rose, Thomas Ellwood	Colonel	77th Regiment Pennsylvania Volunteer Infantry	Bvt. Brig. Gen. USV, July 22, 1865	March 12, 1866	
Ross, Samuel	Colonel	20th Regiment Connecticut Volunteer Infantry	Bvt. Brig. Gen. USV, April 13, 1865	March 12, 1866	Retired as Regular Army Colonel, 1875.
Ross, William Edward Wyatt	Lt. Colonel	31st Regiment U.S. Colored Infantry	Bvt. Brig. Gen. USV, March 13, 1865	May 18, 1866	
Rowett, Richard	Colonel	7th Regiment Illinois Volunteer Infantry	Bvt. Brig. Gen. USV, March 13, 1865	March 12, 1866	
Rowley, William Reuben	Lt. Colonel	Additional Aide-de-Camp, USV	Bvt. Brig. Gen. USV, March 13, 1865	July 27, 1866	
Ruff, Charles Frederick	Lt. Colonel	3rd Regiment U.S. Cavalry	Bvt. Brig. Gen. USA, March 13, 1865	March 2, 1867	
Ruggles, George David	Colonel	Additional Aide-de-Camp, USV	Bvt. Brig. Gen. USA, March 13, 1865; Bvt. Brig. Gen. USV, April 9, 1865	March 12, 1866	USMA 1855; Retired as Regular Army Brig. Gen., 1897.
Ruggles, James McLain	Lt. Colonel	3rd Regiment Illinois Volunteer Cavalry	Bvt. Brig. Gen. USV, March 13, 1865	July 23, 1866	
Runkle, Benjamin Piatt	Lt. Colonel	26th Regiment Veteran Reserve Corps	Bvt. Brig. Gen. USV, November 9, 1865; Bvt. Maj. Gen. USV, November 9, 1865	March 12, 1866; July 19, 1867	
Rusk, Jeremiah McLain	Lt. Colonel	25th Regiment Wisconsin Volunteer Infantry	Bvt. Brig. Gen. USV, March 13, 1865	April 10, 1866	
Rusling, James Fowler	Colonel	Quartermaster Dept., USV	Bvt. Brig. Gen. USV, February 16, 1866	April 10, 1868	
Russell, Charles Sawyer	Lt. Colonel	28th Regiment U.S. Colored Infantry	Bvt. Brig. Gen. USV, July 30, 1864	February 20, 1865	Nominated by Pres. Lincoln, December 12, 1864
Russell, Henry Sturgis	Colonel	5th Regiment Massachusetts Colored Volunteer Cavalry	Bvt. Brig. Gen. USV, March 13, 1865	February 14, 1868	
Rust, Henry Jr.	Colonel	13th Regiment Maine Volunteer Infantry	Bvt. Brig. Gen. USV, March 13, 1865	February 14, 1868	
Rust, John D.	Colonel	8th Regiment Maine Volunteer Infantry	Bvt. Brig. Gen. USV, March 13, 1865	July 26, 1866	
Rutherford, Allan	Lt. Colonel	22nd Regiment Veteran Reserve Corps	Bvt. Brig. Gen. USA, March 2, 1867	March 3, 1869	
Rutherford, George Valentine	Colonel	Quartermaster Dept., USV	Bvt. Brig. Gen. USV, March 13, 1865	March 12, 1866	
Rutherford, Reuben Clifford	Captain	Quartermaster Dept., USV	Bvt. Brig. Gen. USV, March 13, 1865	February 14, 1868	

== Union brevet generals; lower actual, substantive grade ==
=== S ===
Name	Highest actual grade	Unit	Brevet grade, rank date	Date confirmed	Notes, other dates
Sacket, Delos Bennett	Colonel	Inspector Gen. USA	Bvt. Brig. Gen. USA, March 13, 1865; Bvt. Maj. Gen. USA, March 13, 1865	July 23, 1866; February 14, 1868	Died as Regular Army Brig. Gen., 1885.
Sackett, William H.	Colonel	9th Regiment New York Volunteer Cavalry	Bvt. Brig. Gen. USV, March 13, 1865	July 23, 1866	Mortally wounded at Battle of Trevilian Station; Virginia, June 11, 1864
Salm-Salm, Prince Felix	Colonel	68th Regiment New York Volunteer Infantry	Bvt. Brig. Gen. USV, April 13, 1865	March 12, 1866	
Salomon, Charles Eberhard	Colonel	9th Regiment Wisconsin Volunteer Infantry	Bvt. Brig. Gen. USV, March 13, 1865	March 12, 1866	
Salomon, Edward Selig	Lt. Colonel	82nd Regiment Illinois Volunteer Infantry	Bvt. Brig. Gen. USV, March 13, 1865	March 12, 1866	
Sanborn, William	Lt. Colonel	22nd Regiment Michigan Volunteer Infantry	Bvt. Brig. Gen. USV, March 13, 1865	July 26, 1866	
Sanders, Addison Hiatt	Lt. Colonel	16th Regiment Iowa Volunteer Infantry	Bvt. Brig. Gen. USV, March 13, 1865	March 12, 1866	
Sanders, Horace T.	Colonel	19th Regiment Wisconsin Volunteer Infantry	Bvt. Brig. Gen. USV, April 19, 1865	March 12, 1866	
Sanderson, Thomas Wakefield	Lt. Colonel	10th Regiment Ohio Volunteer Cavalry	Bvt. Brig. Gen. USV, March 13, 1865	April 10, 1866	
Sanford, Edward Sewall	Colonel	Additional Aide-de-Camp, USV	Bvt. Brig. Gen. USV, March 13, 1865	March 12, 1866	
Sargent, Horace Binney	Colonel	1st Regiment Massachusetts Volunteer Cavalry	Bvt. Brig. Gen. USV, March 21, 1864	February 20, 1865	Nominated by Pres. Lincoln, December 12, 1864
Satterlee, Richard S.	Major	Medical Purveyor, USA	Bvt. Brig. Gen. USA, September 2, 1864	February 20, 1865	Nominated by Pres. Lincoln, December 12, 1864; Retired as Regular Army Lieutenant Colonel, 1869.
Sawtelle, Charles Greene	Colonel	Quartermaster, USA,	Bvt. Brig. Gen. USA, March 13, 1865	February 14, 1867	
Sawyer, Franklin	Lt. Colonel	8th Regiment Ohio Volunteer Infantry	Bvt. Brig. Gen. USV, March 13, 1865	April 10, 1866	
Scates, Walter Bennett	Major	Asst. Adjutant Gen. USV	Bvt. Brig. Gen. USV, March 13, 1865	April 10, 1866	
Schmitt, William Andrew	Lt. Colonel	27th Regiment Illinois Volunteer Infantry	Bvt. Brig. Gen. USV, March 13, 1865	May 18, 1866	
Schneider, Edward F.	Lt. Colonel	8th Regiment Kansas Volunteer Infantry	Bvt. Brig. Gen. USV, March 13, 1865	March 25, 1866	
Schofield, George Wheeler	Lt. Colonel	2nd Regiment Missouri Volunteer Light Artillery	Bvt. Brig. Gen. USV, January 26, 1865	February 14, 1865	Nominated by Pres. Lincoln, January 23, 1865
Scofield, Hiram	Colonel	47th Regiment U.S. Colored Infantry	Bvt. Brig. Gen. USV, March 13, 1865	April 10, 1866	
Schriver, Edmund	Colonel	Inspector Gen. USA	Bvt. Brig. Gen. USA, August 1, 1864; Bvt. Maj. Gen. USA, March 13, 1865	February 20, 1865; July 14, 1866	Bvt, Brig. Gen. nomination by Pres. Lincoln, December 12, 1864
Schwenk, Samuel Klinger	Lt. Colonel	50th Regiment Pennsylvania Veteran Volunteer Infantry	Bvt. Brig. Gen. USV, July 24, 1865	March 12, 1866	
Scott, George Washington	Colonel	61st Regiment New York Volunteer Infantry	Bvt. Brig. Gen. USV, March 13, 1865	March 12, 1866	
Scott, Rufus	Lt. Colonel	1st Regiment New York Volunteer Dragoons	Bvt. Brig. Gen. USV, March 13, 1865	May 18, 1866	
Scribner, Benjamin Franklin	Colonel	38th Regiment Indiana Volunteer Infantry	Bvt. Brig. Gen. USV, August 8, 1864	February 20, 1866	
Seaver, Joel J.	Colonel	16th Regiment New York Volunteer Infantry	Bvt. Brig. Gen. USV, March 13, 1865	July 26, 1866	
Seawell, Thomas D.	Colonel	57th Regiment U.S. Colored Infantry	Bvt. Brig. Gen. USV, March 13, 1865	July 27, 1866	
Seawell, Washington	Colonel	6th Regiment U.S. Infantry	Bvt. Brig. Gen. USA, March 13, 1865	July 26, 1866	
Selfridge, James Lercon	Colonel	46th Regiment Pennsylvania Volunteer Infantry	Bvt. Brig. Gen. USV, March 16, 1865	March 12, 1866	
Serrell, Edward Wellman	Colonel	1st Regiment New York Volunteer Engineers	Bvt. Brig. Gen. USV, March 13, 1865	April 10, 1866	
Sewall, Frederick Dummer	Colonel	3rd Regiment Veteran Reserve Corps	Bvt. Brig. Gen. USV, July 21, 1865	March 12, 1866	
Sewell, William Joyce	Colonel	38th Regiment New Jersey Volunteer Infantry	Bvt. Brig. Gen. USV, March 13, 1865; Bvt. Maj. Gen. USV, March 13, 1865	March 12, 1866; July 23, 1866	Medal of Honor, Battle of Chancellorsville; U.S. Senator from New Jersey (1881–1887, 1895–1901)
Shaffer, George Thomas	Lt. Colonel	28th Regiment Michigan Volunteer Infantry	Bvt. Brig. Gen. USV, March 13, 1865	July 23, 1866	
Shaffer, John Wilson	Colonel	Additional Aide-de-Camp, USV	Bvt. Brig. Gen. USV, March 13, 1865	July 23, 1866	
Shafter, William Rufus	Colonel	17th Regiment U.S. Colored Infantry	Bvt. Brig. Gen. USV, March 13, 1865	April 26, 1866	Medal of Honor; Retired as Regular Army Brig. Gen., 1901. Maj. Gen. of Volunteers during the Spanish–American War.
Shanks, John Peter Cleaver	Colonel	7th Regiment Indiana Volunteer Cavalry	Bvt. Brig. Gen. USV, December 8, 1864; Bvt. Maj. Gen. USV, March 13, 1865	February 14, 1865; February 14, 1868	Bvt. Brig. Gen. nomination by Pres. Lincoln, December 12, 1864
Sharpe, George Henry	Colonel	120th New York Volunteer Infantry	Bvt. Brig. Gen. USV, December 20, 1864; Bvt. Maj. Gen. USV, March 13, 1865	February 14, 1865; July 23, 1866	Bvt. Brig. Gen. nomination by Pres. Lincoln, December 12, 1864
Sharpe, Jacob	Colonel	156th Regiment New York Volunteer Infantry	Bvt. Brig. Gen. USV, March 13, 1865	July 23, 1866	
Shaurman, Nelson	Colonel	90th Regiment New York Volunteer Infantry	Bvt. Brig. Gen. USV, March 13, 1865	April 10, 1866	
Shaw, James Jr.	Colonel	7th Regiment U.S. Colored Infantry	Bvt. Brig. Gen. USV, March 13, 1865	March 12, 1866	
Shedd, Warren	Colonel	30th Regiment Illinois Volunteer Infantry	Bvt. Brig. Gen. USV, March 13, 1865	March 12, 1866	
Sheets, Benjamin Franklin	Lt. Colonel	92nd Regiment Illinois Volunteer Infantry	Bvt. Brig. Gen. USV, March 13, 1865	May 18, 1866	
Sheetz, Josiah A.	Colonel	8th Regiment Illinois Volunteer Infantry	Bvt. Brig. Gen. USV, March 26, 1865	March 12, 1866	
Sheldon, Charles S.	Colonel	18th Regiment Missouri Volunteer Infantry	Bvt. Brig. Gen. USV, March 13, 1865	March 12, 1866	
Sheldon, Lionel Allen	Colonel	42nd Regiment Ohio Volunteer Infantry	Bvt. Brig. Gen. USV, March 13, 1865	July 23, 1866	
Shepherd, Oliver Lathrop	Colonel	15th Regiment U.S. Infantry	Bvt. Brig. Gen. USA, March 13, 1865	March 28, 1867	USMA 1840
Shepherd, Russell Benjamin	Colonel	1st Regiment Maine Volunteer Heavy Artillery	Bvt. Brig. Gen. USV, March 13, 1865	April 10, 1866	
Sherwin, Thomas Jr.	Lt. Colonel	22nd Regiment Massachusetts Volunteer Infantry	Bvt. Brig. Gen. USV, March 13, 1865	April 26, 1866	
Sherwood, Isaac Ruth	Lt. Colonel	111th Regiment Ohio Volunteer Infantry	Bvt. Brig. Gen. USV, February 27, 1865	March 10, 1865	Nominated by Pres. Lincoln, February 27, 1865
Shiras, Alexander Eakin	Colonel	Asst. Commissary Gen. of Subsistence, USA	Bvt. Brig. Gen. USA, September 17, 1864; Bvt. Maj. Gen. USA, March 13, 1865	February 20, 1865; July 14, 1866	Bvt. Brig. Gen. nomination by Pres. Lincoln, December 12, 1864
Shoup, Samuel Newton	Lt. Colonel	114th Regiment Illinois Volunteer Infantry	Bvt. Brig. Gen. USV, March 13, 1865	April 19, 1866	
Shunk, David	Colonel	8th Regiment Indiana Volunteer Infantry	Bvt. Brig. Gen. USV, February 9, 1865	February 9, 1865	Nominated by Pres. Lincoln, February 9, 1865
Shurtleff, Giles Waldo	Colonel	5th U.S. Colored Infantry	Bvt. Brig. Gen. USV, March 13, 1865	April 10, 1866	
Sibley, Caleb Chase	Colonel	16th Regiment U.S. Infantry	Bvt. Brig. Gen. USA, March 13, 1865	February 14, 1868	
Sickel, Horatio Gates	Colonel	198th Regiment Pennsylvania Volunteer Infantry	Bvt. Brig. Gen. USV, October 21, 1864; Bvt. Maj. Gen. USV, March 13, 1865	February 14, 1865 lJuly 19, 1867	Bvt. Brig. Gen. nomination by Pres. Lincoln, December 12, 1864
Sickles, Hiram Franklin	Colonel	147th Regiment Illinois Volunteer Infantry	Bvt. Brig. Gen. USV, March 13, 1865	April 10, 1866	
Sidell, William Henry	Lt. Colonel	10th Regiment U.S. Infantry	Bvt. Brig. Gen. USA, March 13, 1865	March 2, 1867	
Sigfried, Joshua K.	Colonel	48th Regiment Pennsylvania Volunteer Infantry	Bvt. Brig. Gen. USV, August 1, 1864	February 20, 1865	Nominated by Pres. Lincoln, December 12, 1864
Simonson, John Smith	Colonel	3rd Regiment U.S. Cavalry	Bvt. Brig. Gen. USA, March 13, 1865	July 26, 1866	
Simpson, James Hervey	Lt. Colonel	Corps of Engineers, USA	Bvt. Brig. Gen. USA, March 13, 1865	July 14, 1866	USMA 1832; Retired as Regular Army Colonel, 1880.
Simpson, Marcus de Lafayette	Lt. Colonel	Asst. Commissary Gen. of Subsistence, USA	Bvt. Brig. Gen. USA, March 13, 1865; Bvt. Maj. Gen. USA, March 13, 1865	July 14, 1866; April 10, 1867	
Simpson, Samuel P.	Lt. Colonel	31st Regiment Missouri Volunteer Infantry	Bvt. Brig. Gen. USV, March 13, 1865	April 10, 1866	
Slevin, Patrick Sumerville	Colonel	100th Regiment Ohio Volunteer Infantry	Bvt. Brig. Gen. USV, March 13, 1865	April 10, 1866	
Slocum, William	Lt. Colonel	120th Regiment Ohio Volunteer Infantry	Bvt. Brig. Gen. USV, March 13, 1865	July 27, 1866	
Small, Michael Peter	Lt. Colonel	Commissary Gen. of Subsistence Dept., USA	Bvt. Brig. Gen. USA, April 9, 1865	February 14, 1868	
Smith, Alfred Baker	Colonel	150th Regiment New York Volunteer Infantry	Bvt. Brig. Gen. USV, March 13, 1865	March 12, 1866	
Smith, Arthur Arnold	Colonel	83rd Regiment Illinois Volunteer Infantry	Bvt. Brig. Gen. USV, March 13, 1865	March 12, 1866	
Smith, Benjamin Franklin	Colonel	126th Regiment Ohio Volunteer Infantry	Bvt. Brig. Gen. USV, March 26, 1865	March 12, 1866	
Smith, Charles Edward	Lt. Colonel	11th Regiment Michigan Volunteer Cavalry	Bvt. Brig. Gen. USV, March 13, 1865	April 10, 1866	
Smith, Charles Henry	Colonel	1st Regiment Maine Volunteer Cavalry	Bvt. Brig. Gen. USV, August 1, 1864; Bvt. Maj. Gen. USV, March 13, 1865; Bvt. Brig. Gen. USA, March 2, 1867; Bvt. Maj. Gen. USA, March 2, 1867	February 20, 1865; March 12, 1866; April 5, 1867; July 23, 1868	Medal of Honor; Bvt. Brig. Gen. nomination by Pres. Lincoln, December 12, 1864
Smith, Edward Worthington	Lt. Colonel	Asst. Adjutant Gen. USV	Bvt. Brig. Gen. USV, March 13, 1865	March 12, 1866	
Smith, Franklin C.	Colonel	102nd Regiment Illinois Volunteer Infantry	Bvt. Brig. Gen. USV, March 13, 1865	March 12, 1866	
Smith, George Washington	Lt. Colonel	88th Regiment Illinois Volunteer Infantry	Bvt. Brig. Gen. USV, March 13, 1865	March 12, 1866	
Smith, Israel Canton	Lt. Colonel	10th Regiment Michigan Volunteer Cavalry	Bvt. Brig. Gen. USV, March 13, 1865	July 27, 1866	
Smith, James	Colonel	128th Regiment New York Volunteer Infantry	Bvt. Brig. Gen. USV, March 13, 1865	March 24, 1868	
Smith, John Corson	Lt. Colonel	96th Regiment Illinois Volunteer Infantry	Bvt. Brig. Gen. USV, June 20, 1865	March 12, 1866	
Smith, Joseph Rowe	Major	7th Regiment U.S. Infantry	Bvt. Brig. Gen. USA, April 9, 1865	February 23, 1867	
Smith, Joseph Sewall	Lt. Colonel	Commissary Gen. of Subsistence Dept., USV	Bvt. Brig. Gen. USV, July 11, 1865	April 26, 1866	
Smith, Orland	Colonel	73rd Regiment Ohio Volunteer Infantry	Bvt. Brig. Gen. USV, March 13, 1865	July 27, 1866	
Smith, Orlow	Major	65th Regiment Ohio Volunteer Infantry	Bvt. Brig. Gen. USV, March 13, 1865	April 10, 1866	
Smith, Robert Frederick	Colonel	16th Regiment Illinois Volunteer Infantry	Bvt. Brig. Gen. USV, March 13, 1865	March 12, 1866	
Smith, Robert Wilson	Colonel	16th Regiment Illinois Volunteer Cavalry	Bvt. Brig. Gen. USV, March 13, 1865	March 2, 1867	
Smith, William Jay	Colonel	6th Regiment Tennessee Volunteer Cavalry	Bvt. Brig. Gen. USV, July 16, 1865	March 12, 1866	
Sniper, Gustavus	Colonel	185th Regiment New York Volunteer Infantry	Bvt. Brig. Gen. USV, March 13, 1865	April 10, 1866	
Sowers, Carl Edgar	Lt. Colonel	118th Regiment Ohio Volunteer Infantry	Bvt. Brig. Gen. USV, March 13, 1865	March 12, 1867	
Spalding, George	Colonel	12th Regiment Tennessee Volunteer Cavalry	Bvt. Brig. Gen. USV, March 21, 1865	March 12, 1866	
Spaulding, Ira	Lt. Colonel	50th Regiment New York Volunteer Engineers	Bvt. Brig. Gen. USV, April 9, 1865	March 12, 1866	
Spaulding, Oliver Lyman	Colonel	23rd Regiment Michigan Volunteer Infantry	Bvt. Brig. Gen. USV, June 25, 1865	March 12, 1866	
Spear, Ellis	Lt. Colonel	20th Regiment Maine Volunteer Infantry	Bvt. Brig. Gen. USV, April 9, 1865	April 10, 1866	
Spear, Samuel Perkins	Colonel	11th Regiment Pennsylvania Volunteer Cavalry	Bvt. Brig. Gen. USV, March 13, 1865	March 12, 1866	
Spencer, George Eliphaz	Colonel	1st Regiment Alabama Volunteer Cavalry	Bvt. Brig. Gen. USV, March 13, 1865	March 12, 1866	U.S. Senator from Alabama (1868–1879)
Spicely, William Thomas	Colonel	24th Regiment Indiana Volunteer Infantry	Bvt. Brig. Gen. USV, March 26, 1865	March 12, 1866	
Spofford, John Pembroke	Colonel	97th Regiment New York Volunteer Infantry	Bvt. Brig. Gen. USV, March 13, 1866	February 6, 1867	
Spooner, Benjamin J.	Colonel	83rd Regiment Indiana Volunteer Infantry	Bvt. Brig. Gen. USV, March 13, 1865; Bvt. Maj. Gen. USV, March 13, 1865	April 10, 1866; April 10, 1866	
Sprague, Augustus Brown Reed	Lt. Colonel	2nd Regiment Massachusetts Volunteer Heavy Artillery	Bvt. Brig. Gen. USV, March 13, 1865	July 26, 1866	
Sprague, Ezra T.	Colonel	42nd Regiment Wisconsin Volunteer Infantry	Bvt. Brig. Gen. USV, June 20, 1865	March 12, 1866	
Spurling, Andrew B.	Lt. Colonel	2nd Regiment Maine Volunteer Cavalry	Bvt. Brig. Gen. USV, March 26, 1865	April 10, 1866	Error as to name Spaulding corrected December 3, 1867
Stafford, Joab Arwin	Colonel	178th Regiment Ohio Volunteer Infantry	Bvt. Brig. Gen. USV, March 13, 1865	April 10, 1866	
Stager, Anson	Colonel	Military Telegraph Corps	Bvt. Brig. Gen. USV, March 13, 1865	March 12, 1866	
Stagg, Peter	Colonel	1st Regiment Michigan Volunteer Cavalry	Bvt. Brig. Gen. USV, March 13, 1865	March 12, 1866	
Stanley, Timothy Robbins	Colonel	18th Regiment Ohio Volunteer Infantry	Bvt. Brig. Gen. USV, March 13, 1865	April 10, 1866	
Stanton, David Leroy	Colonel	1st Maryland Infantry Regiment	Bvt. Brig. Gen. USV, April 1, 1865	July 23, 1866	
Starbird, Isaac Warren	Colonel	19th Regiment Maine Volunteer Infantry	Bvt. Brig. Gen. USV, April 7, 1865	March 12, 1866	
Starring, Frederick Augustus	Colonel	72nd Regiment Illinois Volunteer Infantry	Bvt. Brig. Gen. USV, March 13, 1865	April 10, 1866	
Stedman, Griffin Alexander Jr.	Colonel	11th Regiment Connecticut Volunteer Infantry	Bvt. Brig. Gen. USV, August 5, 1864	February 20, 1865	Mortally wounded at Petersburg, Virginia, August 5, 1864. Nominated by Pres. Lincoln, December 12, 1864. Commission not issued
Stedman, William	Colonel	6th Regiment Ohio Volunteer Cavalry	Bvt. Brig. Gen. USV, March 13, 1865	April 10, 1866	
Steere, William H. P.	Colonel	4th Regiment Rhode Island Volunteer Infantry	Bvt. Brig. Gen. USV, March 13, 1865	July 19, 1867	
Steiner, John Alexander	Lt. Colonel	13th Regiment Maryland Volunteer Infantry	Bvt. Brig. Gen. USV, March 13, 1865	April 8, 1867	
Stephenson, Luther Jr.	Lt. Colonel	32nd Regiment Massachusetts Volunteer Infantry	Bvt. Brig. Gen. USV, March 13, 1865	February 8, 1867	
Stevens, Aaron Fletcher	Colonel	13th Regiment New Hampshire Volunteer Infantry	Bvt. Brig. Gen. USV, December 8, 1864	March 12, 1866	
Stevens, Ambrose A.	Colonel	5th Regiment Veteran Reserve Corps	Bvt. Brig. Gen. USV, March 7, 1865	March 10, 1865	Nominated by Pres. Lincoln, March 7, 1865
Stevens, Hazard	Major	Asst. Adjutant Gen. USV	Bvt. Brig. Gen. USV, April 2, 1865	March 12, 1866	Medal of Honor
Stevenson, Robert Hooper	Lt. Colonel	24th Regiment Massachusetts Volunteer Infantry	Bvt. Brig. Gen. USV, March 13, 1865	July 26, 1866	
Stewart, James Jr.	Colonel	9th Regiment New Jersey Volunteer Infantry	Bvt. Brig. Gen. USV, March 13, 1865	March 12, 1866	
Stewart, William Scott	Lt. Colonel	65th Regiment Illinois Volunteer Infantry	Bvt. Brig. Gen. USV, March 13, 1865	March 12, 1866	
Stewart, William Warren	Lt. Colonel	1st Regiment Reserves Pennsylvania; Volunteer Infantry	Bvt. Brig. Gen. USV, March 13, 1865	July 27, 1866	
Stibbs, John Howard	Lt. Colonel	12th Regiment Iowa Volunteer Infantry	Bvt. Brig. Gen. USV, March 13, 1865	April 10, 1866	
Stiles, Israel Newton	Colonel	63rd Regiment Indiana Volunteer Infantry	Bvt. Brig. Gen. USV, January 31, 1865	February 20, 1865	Nominated by Pres. Lincoln, January 31, 1865
Stockton, Joseph	Lt. Colonel	72nd Regiment Illinois Volunteer Infantry	Bvt. Brig. Gen. USV, March 13, 1865	March 12, 1866	
Stokes, William Brickly	Colonel	5th Regiment Tennessee Volunteer Cavalry	Bvt. Brig. Gen. USV, March 13, 1865	February 21, 1867	
Stone, George Augustus	Colonel	25th Regiment Iowa Volunteer Infantry	Bvt. Brig. Gen. USV, March 13, 1865	March 12, 1866	
Stone, Roy	Colonel	149th Regiment Pennsylvania Volunteer Infantry	Bvt. Brig. Gen. USV, September 7, 1864	February 20, 1865	Nominated by Pres. Lincoln, December 12, 1864; Brigadier general during the Spanish–American War
Stone, William Milo	Colonel	22nd Regiment Iowa Volunteer Infantry	Bvt. Brig. Gen. USV, March 13, 1865	April 10, 1866	Governor of Iowa; General Land Office Commissioner
Stough, William	Lt. Colonel	9th Regiment Ohio Volunteer Cavalry	Bvt. Brig. Gen. USV, March 13, 1865	July 27, 1866	
Stoughton, Charles Bradley	Colonel	4th Regiment Vermont Infantry Volunteers	Bvt. Brig. Gen. USV, March 13, 1865	February 14, 1868	
Stoughton, William Lewis	Colonel	11th Regiment Michigan Volunteer Infantry	Bvt. Brig. Gen. USV, March 13, 1865; Bvt. Maj. Gen. USV, March 13, 1865	March 12, 1866; March 2, 1867	
Stout, Alexander Miller	Colonel	17th Regiment Kentucky Volunteer Infantry	Bvt. Brig. Gen. USV, March 13, 1865	March 12, 1866	
Stratton, Franklin Asa	Lt. Colonel	11th Regiment Pennsylvania Volunteer Cavalry	Bvt. Brig. Gen. USV, March 13, 1865	July 27, 1866	
Streight, Abel Delos	Colonel	51st Regiment Indiana Volunteer Infantry	Bvt. Brig. Gen. USV, March 13, 1865	March 12, 1866	
Strickland, Silas A.	Colonel	50th Regiment Ohio Volunteer Infantry	Bvt. Brig. Gen. USV, May 27, 1865	March 12, 1866	
Strong, James Clark	Colonel	15th Regiment Veteran Reserve Corps	Bvt. Brig. Gen. USV, March 13, 1865	March 12, 1866	
Strong, Thomas J.	Lt. Colonel	16th Regiment New York Volunteer Heavy Artillery	Bvt. Brig. Gen. USV, March 13, 1865	May 18, 1866	
Strong, William Emertson	Lt. Colonel	Asst. Inspector Gen. USV	Bvt. Brig. Gen. USV, March 21, 1865	March 12, 1866	
Strother, David Hunter	Colonel	3rd Regiment West Virginia Volunteer Cavalry	Bvt. Brig. Gen. USV, August 23, 1865	March 12, 1866	
Sullivan, Peter John	Colonel	48th Regiment Ohio Volunteer Infantry	Bvt. Brig. Gen. USV, March 13, 1865	February 6, 1867	
Sumner, Edwin Vose Jr.	Colonel	1st Regiment New York Volunteer Mounted Rifles	Bvt. Brig. Gen. USV, March 28, 1865	March 12, 1866	Retired as Regular Army Brig. Gen., 1899.
Sweet, Benjamin Jeffrey	Colonel	8th Regiment Veteran Reserve Corps; Camp Douglas	Bvt. Brig. Gen. USV, December 20, 1864	February 14, 1865	Nominated by Pres. Lincoln, December 14, 1864
Sweitzer, Jacob Bowman	Colonel	62nd Regiment Pennsylvania Volunteer Infantry	Bvt. Brig. Gen. USV, March 13, 1865	April 10, 1866	
Sweitzer, Nelson Bowman	Colonel	16th Regiment New York Volunteer Cavalry	Bvt. Brig. Gen. USV, March 13, 1865; Bvt. Brig. Gen. USA, March 13, 1865	March 12, 1866; July 17, 1868	
Swift, Frederick William	Colonel	17th Regiment Michigan Volunteer Infantry	Bvt. Brig. Gen. USV, March 13, 1865	February 14, 1868	
Switzler, Theodore A.	Lt. Colonel	6th Regiment Missouri Volunteer Cavalry	Bvt. Brig. Gen. USV, March 13, 1865	July 23, 1866	
Swords, Thomas	Colonel	Asst. Quartermaster Gen. USA	Bvt. Brig. Gen. USA, March 13, 1865; Bvt. Maj. Gen. USA, March 13, 1865	July 27, 1866; April 16, 1867	
Sypher, J. Hale	Colonel	11th Regiment U.S. Colored Artillery	Bvt. Brig. Gen. USV, March 13, 1865	March 12, 1866	

== Union brevet generals; lower actual, substantive grade ==
=== T ===
Name	Highest actual grade	Unit	Brevet grade, rank date	Date confirmed	Notes, other dates
Talbot, Thomas Hammond	Lt. Colonel	1st Regiment Maine Volunteer Heavy Artillery	Bvt. Brig. Gen. USV, March 13, 1865	March 28, 1867	
Talley, William Cooper	Colonel	1st Regiment Pennsylvania Reserves Volunteer Infantry	Bvt. Brig. Gen. USV, March 13, 1865	July 27, 1866	
Tarbell, Jonathan	Colonel	91st Regiment New York Volunteer Infantry	Bvt. Brig. Gen. USV, March 13, 1865	March 12, 1866	
Taylor, Ezra	Colonel	1st Regiment Illinois Volunteer Light Artillery	Bvt. Brig. Gen. USV, March 13, 1865	April 10, 1866	
Taylor, Jacob E.	Colonel	188th Regiment Ohio Volunteer Infantry	Bvt. Brig. Gen. USV, March 13, 1865	March 12, 1866	
Taylor, John P.	Colonel	1st Regiment Pennsylvania Volunteer Cavalry	Bvt. Brig. Gen. USV, August 4, 1865	March 12, 1866	
Taylor, Thomas Thompson	Major	47th Regiment Ohio Volunteer Infantry	Bvt. Brig. Gen. USV, March 13, 1865	April 10, 1866	
Tevis, Washington Carroll	Colonel	3rd Regiment Maryland Volunteer Cavalry	Bvt. Brig. Gen. USV, March 13, 1865	February 8, 1867	Served under the name C. Carroll Tevis.
Tew, George Washington	Lt. Colonel	5th Regiment Rhode Island Volunteer Heavy Artillery	Bvt. Brig. Gen. USV, March 13, 1865	February 21, 1867	
Thayer, Sylvanus	Colonel	Corps of Engineers, USA	Bvt. Brig. Gen. USA, May 31, 1863	April 27, 1864	Also July 26, 1866. Nominated by Pres. Lincoln, April 21, 1864; USMA, 1808.
Thom, George	Major	Corps of Engineers, USA	Bvt. Brig. Gen. USA, March 13, 1865	March 2, 1867	
Thomas, Charles	Colonel	Asst. Quartermaster Gen. USA	Bvt. Brig. Gen. USA, July 5, 1864; Bvt. Maj. Gen. USA, March 13, 1865	February 14, 1865, July 14, 1866	Bvt. Brig. Gen. nomination by Pres. Lincoln, January 23, 1865
Thomas, De Witt Clinton	Colonel	93rd Regiment Indiana Volunteer Infantry	Bvt. Brig. Gen. USV, March 13, 1865	March 28, 1867	
Thomas, Minor T.	Colonel	8th Regiment Minnesota Volunteer Infantry	Bvt. Brig. Gen. USV, February 10, 1865	February 14, 1865	Nominated by Pres. Lincoln, February 10, 1865
Thomas, Samuel	Colonel	64th Regiment U.S. Colored Infantry	Bvt. Brig. Gen. USV, March 13, 1865	April 10, 1866	
Thompson, Charles Robinson	Colonel	12th Regiment U.S. Colored Infantry	Bvt. Brig. Gen. USV, April 13, 1865	March 12, 1866	
Thompson, Henry Elmer	Lt. Colonel	6th Regiment Michigan Volunteer Cavalry	Bvt. Brig. Gen. USV, March 13, 1865	April 10, 1866	
Thompson, John Leverett	Colonel	1st Regiment New Hampshire Volunteer Cavalry	Bvt. Brig. Gen. USV, March 13, 1865	March 12, 1866	
Thompson, Robert	Lt. Colonel	115th Regiment Pennsylvania Volunteer Infantry	Bvt. Brig. Gen. USV, March 13, 1865	February 14, 1868	
Thompson, William	Colonel	1st Regiment Iowa Volunteer Cavalry	Bvt. Brig. Gen. USV, March 13, 1865	March 12, 1866	
Thomson, David	Lt. Colonel	82nd Regiment Ohio Volunteer Infantry	Bvt. Brig. Gen. USV, March 13, 1865	July 23, 1866	
Thornton, William Anderson	Colonel	Ordnance Dept., USA	Bvt. Brig. Gen. USA, March 13, 1865	July 26, 1866	
Thorp, Thomas Jones	Colonel	1st Regiment New York Dragoons	Bvt. Brig. Gen. USV, March 13, 1865	March 12, 1866	
Throop, William A.	Lt. Colonel	1st Regiment Michigan Volunteer Infantry	Bvt. Brig. Gen. USV, March 13, 1865	March 12, 1866	
Thruston, Gates Phillips	Lt. Colonel	Asst. Adjutant Gen. USV	Bvt. Brig. Gen. USV, March 13, 1865	February 6, 1867	
Thurston, William Henry	Lt. Colonel	Asst. Inspector Gen. USV	Bvt. Brig. Gen. USV, March 13, 1865	March 12, 1866	
Tidball, John Caldwell	Colonel	4th Regiment New York Volunteer Heavy Artillery	Bvt. Brig. Gen. USV, August 1, 1864; Bvt. Brig. Gen. USA, March 13, 1865; Bvt. Maj. Gen. USV, April 2, 1865	February 20, 1865; July 23, 1866; March 12, 1866	USMA, 1848.
Tilden, Charles William	Colonel	16th Regiment Maine Volunteer Infantry	Bvt. Brig. Gen. USV, March 13, 1865	April 10, 1866	
Tilghman, Benjamin Chew	Colonel	3rd Regiment U.S. Colored Infantry	Bvt. Brig. Gen. USV, April 13, 1865	March 12, 1866	
Tillson, John	Colonel	10th Regiment Illinois Volunteer Infantry	Bvt. Brig. Gen. USV, March 10, 1865	March 11, 1865	Nominated by Pres. Lincoln, March 11, 1865.
Tilton, William Stowell	Colonel	22nd Regiment Massachusetts Volunteer Infantry	Bvt. Brig. Gen. USV, September 9, 1864	February 20, 1865	Nominated by Pres. Lincoln, December 12, 1864
Titus, Herbert Bradwell	Colonel	9th Regiment New Hampshire Volunteer Infantry	Bvt. Brig. Gen. USV, March 13, 1865	July 26, 1866	
Tompkins, Charles H.	Colonel	1st Regiment Vermont Volunteer Cavalry	Bvt. Brig. Gen. USA, March 13, 1865	February 14, 1865	Medal of Honor; Commissioner, Lincoln assassination trial
Tompkins, Charles Henry	Colonel	1st Regiment Rhode Island Volunteer Heavy Artillery	Bvt. Brig. Gen. USV, August 1, 1864		For 1864 campaigns before Richmond and in Shenandoah Valley; Nominated by Pres. Lincoln, December 12, 1864
Totten, James	Major	Asst. Inspector Gen. USA	Bvt. Brig. Gen. USA, March 13, 1865	July 23, 1866	USMA, 1841.
Tourtelotte, John Eaton	Colonel	4th Regiment Minnesota Volunteer Infantry	Bvt. Brig. Gen. USV, March 13, 1865	March 12, 1866	
Townsend, Edward Davis	Colonel	Asst. Adjutant Gen. USA	Bvt. Brig. Gen. USA, September 24, 1864; Bvt. Maj. Gen. USA, March 13, 1865	February 20, 1865, July 14, 1866	USMA, 1837; Retired as Regular Army Brigadier General, 1880.
Townsend, Frederick	Lt. Colonel	9th Regiment U.S. Infantry	Bvt. Brig. Gen. USA, March 13, 1865	July 25, 1866	3-time Adjutant-General of New York
Tracy, Benjamin Franklin	Colonel	127th Regiment U.S. Colored Infantry	Bvt. Brig. Gen. USV, March 13, 1865	February 21, 1867	Medal of Honor
Trauernicht, Theodore	Lt. Colonel	13th Regiment U.S. Colored Infantry	Bvt. Brig. Gen. USV, March 13, 1865	March 2, 1867	
Tremain, Henry Edwin	Major	Aide-de-Camp, USV	Bvt. Brig. Gen. USV, November 30, 1865	March 12, 1866	Medal of Honor
Tripler, Charles Stuart	Major	Surgeon, USA	Bvt. Brig. Gen. USA, March 13, 1865	February 23, 1867	Posthumously promoted to Brigadier General, 1867.
Trotter, Frederick Eugene	Lt. Colonel	1st Regiment Veteran Reserve Corps	Bvt. Brig. Gen. USV, March 13, 1865	April 10, 1866	
Trowbridge, Luther Stephen	Colonel	10th Regiment Michigan Volunteer Cavalry	Bvt. Brig. Gen. USV, June 15, 1865; Bvt. Maj. Gen. USV, June 15, 1865	March 12, 1866; March 28, 1867	
True, James Milton	Colonel	62nd Regiment Illinois Volunteer Infantry	Bvt. Brig. Gen. USV, March 6, 1865	March 10, 1865	Nominated by Pres. Lincoln, March 6, 1865
Truex, William Snyder	Colonel	14th Regiment New Jersey Volunteer Infantry	Bvt. Brig. Gen. USV, April 2, 1865	February 5, 1866	Error corrected December 3, 1867
Trumbull, Matthew Mark	Colonel	9th Regiment Iowa Volunteer Cavalry	Bvt. Brig. Gen. USV, March 13, 1865	March 12, 1866	
Turley, John Alexander	Colonel	91st Regiment Ohio Volunteer Infantry	Bvt. Brig. Gen. USV, March 13, 1865	July 26, 1866	
Turner, Charles	Colonel	108th Regiment Illinois Volunteer Infantry	Bvt. Brig. Gen. USV, March 26, 1865	March 12, 1866	

== Union brevet generals; lower actual, substantive grade ==
=== V ===
Name	Highest actual grade	Unit	Brevet grade, rank date	Date confirmed	Notes, other dates
Vail, Jacob Garetson	Colonel	17th Regiment Indiana Volunteer Infantry	Bvt. Brig. Gen. USV, March 13, 1865	March 12, 1866	
Vail, Nicholas J.	Major	14th Regiment U.S. Colored Infantry	Bvt. Brig. Gen. USV, March 13, 1865	No record in Eicher	
Van Antwerp, Verplanck	Major	Additional Aide-de-Camp, USV	Bvt. Brig. Gen. USV, February 13, 1865	February 23, 1865	Nominated by Pres. Lincoln, February 13, 1865
Van Buren, Daniel Tompkins	Colonel	Additional Aide-de-Camp, USV	Bvt. Brig. Gen. USV, March 13, 1865	March 12, 1866	
Van Buren, James Lyman	Major	Additional Aide-de-Camp, USV	Bvt. Brig. Gen. USV, April 2, 1865	March 12, 1866	
Van Buren, Thomas Brodhead	Colonel	102nd Regiment New York Volunteer Infantry	Bvt. Brig. Gen. USV, March 13, 1865	April 12, 1866	
Van Petten, John Bullock	Lt. Colonel	160th Regiment New York Volunteer Infantry	Bvt. Brig. Gen. USV, March 13, 1865	March 12, 1866	
Varney, George	Colonel	2nd Regiment Maine Volunteer Infantry	Bvt. Brig. Gen. USV, March 13, 1865	February 21, 1867	
Vaughan, Samuel K.	Lt. Colonel	19th Regiment Wisconsin Volunteer Infantry	Bvt. Brig. Gen. USV, August 9, 1865	April 10, 1866	
Viall, Nelson	Lt. Colonel	11th Regiment U.S. Colored Artillery	Bvt. Brig. Gen. USV, March 13, 1865	April 10, 1866	
Vickers, David	Colonel	4th Regiment New Jersey Volunteer Infantry	Bvt. Brig. Gen. USV, May 31, 1865	March 12, 1866	
Vifquain, Victor	Lt. Colonel	97th Regiment Illinois Volunteer Infantry	Bvt. Brig. Gen. USV, March 13, 1865	April 10, 1866	Medal of Honor for Battle of Fort Blakeley; Colonel U.S.V. during the Spanish–American War
Vincent, Thomas McCurdy	Major	Asst. Adjutant Gen. USA	Bvt. Brig. Gen. USA, March 13, 1865	May 4, 1866	
Vinton, David Hammond	Colonel	Quartermaster Gen. USA	Bvt. Maj. Gen. USA, March 13, 1865	July 25, 1866; April 16, 1867	
Von Blessingh, Louis	Lt. Colonel	37th Regiment Ohio Volunteer Infantry	Bvt. Brig. Gen. USV, March 13, 1865	April 10, 1866	
von Egloffstein, Baron Frederick W.	Colonel	103rd Regiment New York Volunteer Infantry	Bvt. Brig. Gen. USV, March 13, 1865	March 2, 1867	
Von Schack, George	Colonel	7th Regiment New York Veteran Volunteer Infantry	Bvt. Brig. Gen. USV, March 13, 1865	March 12, 1866	
Von Schrader, Alexander	Major	Asst. Adjutant Gen. USV	Bvt. Brig. Gen. USV, March 13, 1865	February 6, 1867	For Battle of Stone's River, Battle of Chickamauga, Atlanta campaign, Battle of Jonesboro. Died as Regular Army major, 1867
Von Vegesack, Baron Ernest	Colonel	20th Regiment New York Volunteer Infantry	Bvt. Brig. Gen. USV, March 13, 1865	April 10, 1866	Medal of Honor for Battle of Gaines Mill
Voris, Alvin Coe	Colonel	67th Regiment Ohio Volunteer Infantry	Bvt. Brig. Gen. USV, December 8, 1864; Bvt. Maj. Gen. USV, November 15, 1865	March 10, 1865; March 12, 1866	
Vreeland, Michael James	Lt. Colonel	4th Regiment Michigan Volunteer Infantry	Bvt. Brig. Gen. USV, March 13, 1865	April 10, 1866	

== Union brevet generals; lower actual, substantive grade ==
=== W ===
Name	Highest actual grade	Unit	Brevet grade, rank date	Date confirmed	Notes, other dates
Wade, James F.	Colonel	6th Regiment U.S. Colored Cavalry	Bvt. Brig. Gen. USV, February 13, 1865	February 23, 1865	Nominated by Pres. Lincoln, February 13, 1865
Wagner, Louis	Colonel	88th Regiment Pennsylvania Volunteer Infantry	Bvt. Brig. Gen. USV, March 13, 1865	April 10, 1866	9th Commander-in-Chief of the Grand Army of the Republic, 1880-1881
Wainwright, Charles Shiels	Colonel	1st Regiment New York Volunteer Light Artillery	Bvt. Brig. Gen. USV, August 1, 1864	February 20, 1865	Nominated by Pres. Lincoln, December 12, 1864
Wainwright, William P.	Colonel	76th Regiment New York Volunteer Infantry	Bvt. Brig. Gen. USV, March 13, 1865	February 14, 1868	
Waite, Carlos Adolphus	Colonel	1st Regiment U.S. Infantry	Bvt. Brig. Gen. USA, March 13, 1865	July 26, 1866	Commission not issued
Waite, Charles	Colonel	27th Regiment Michigan Volunteer Infantry	Bvt. Brig. Gen. USV, April 2, 1865	March 12, 1866	
Waite, John M.	Major	8th Regiment Illinois Volunteer Cavalry	Bvt. Brig. Gen. USV, March 13, 1865	March 12, 1866	
Walcott, Charles Folsom	Colonel	61st Regiment Massachusetts Volunteer Infantry	Bvt. Brig. Gen. USV, April 9, 1865	March 12, 1866	
Walker, Duncan Stephen	Lt. Colonel	Asst. Adjutant Gen. USV	Bvt. Brig. Gen. USV, March 13, 1865	April 10, 1866	
Walker, Francis Amasa	Lt. Colonel	Asst. Adjutant Gen. USV	Bvt. Brig. Gen. USV, March 13, 1865	July 23, 1866	
Walker, Moses B.	Colonel	31st Regiment Ohio Volunteer Infantry	Bvt. Brig. Gen. USV, March 27, 1865	March 12, 1866	
Walker, Samuel	Lt. Colonel	16th Regiment Kansas Volunteer Cavalry	Bvt. Brig. Gen. USV, March 13, 1865	July 23, 1866	
Walker, Thomas McCormick	Colonel	111th Regiment Pennsylvania Volunteer Infantry	Bvt. Brig. Gen. USV, July 5, 1865	March 12, 1866	
Wallace, Martin Reuben Merritt	Colonel	4th Regiment Illinois Volunteer Cavalry	Bvt. Brig. Gen. USV, March 13, 1865	May 18, 1866	
Wallen, Henry Davies	Major	7th Regiment U.S. Infantry	Bvt. Brig. Gen. USA, March 13, 1865	July 25, 1866	
Wangelin, Hugo	Colonel	12th Regiment Missouri Volunteer Infantry	Bvt. Brig. Gen. USV, March 13, 1865	March 12, 1866	
Ward, George Hull	Colonel	15th Regiment Massachusetts Volunteer Infantry	Bvt. Brig. Gen. USV, July 2, 1863		Died July 3, 1863, of wounds received at Gettysburg July 2, 1863
Ward, Henry Clark	Colonel	31st Regiment U.S. Colored Infantry	Bvt. Brig. Gen. USV, November 29, 1865		
Ward, Jesse Durbin	Colonel	17th Regiment Ohio Volunteer Infantry	Bvt. Brig. Gen. USV, October 18, 1865	March 12, 1866	
Ward, Lyman Munson	Colonel	14th Regiment Wisconsin Volunteer Infantry	Bvt. Brig. Gen. USV, March 13, 1865	March 12, 1866	
Warner, Adoniram Judson	Colonel	17th Regiment Veteran Reserve Corps	Bvt. Brig. Gen. USV, March 13, 1865	March 12, 1866	U. S. House of Representatives 1879–1881, 1883-1887
Warner, Darius B.	Colonel	113th Regiment Ohio Volunteer Infantry	Bvt. Brig. Gen. USV, March 13, 1865	April 26, 1866	
Warner, Edward Raynsford	Lt. Colonel	1st Regiment New York Volunteer Artillery	Bvt. Brig. Gen. USV, April 9, 1865	March 12, 1866	
Warner, Willard	Colonel	180th Regiment Ohio Volunteer Infantry	Bvt. Brig. Gen. USV, March 13, 1865; Bvt. Maj. Gen. USV, March 13, 1865	March 12, 1866; March 2, 1867	
Warren, Lucius Henry	Lt. Colonel	38th Regiment U.S. Colored Infantry	Bvt. Brig. Gen. USV, March 13, 1865	March 2, 1867	
Washburn, Francis	Colonel	4th Regiment Massachusetts Volunteer Cavalry	Bvt. Brig. Gen. USV, April 6, 1865	March 12, 1866	
Washburn, Henry Dana	Colonel	18th Regiment Indiana Volunteer Infantry	Bvt. Brig. Gen. USV, December 15, 1864; Bvt. Maj. Gen. USV, July 26, 1865	February 14, 1864; May 18, 1866	Nominated by Pres. Lincoln, December 12, 1864
Washburne, George Abiel	Lt. Colonel	20th Regiment Veteran Reserve Corps	Bvt. Brig. Gen. USV, March 13, 1865	April 10, 1866	
Wass, Ansell Dyer	Colonel	60th Regiment Massachusetts Volunteer Infantry	Bvt. Brig. Gen. USV, March 13, 1865	March 12, 1866	
Waters, Louis Henry	Colonel	84th Regiment Illinois Volunteer Infantry	Bvt. Brig. Gen. USV, June 18, 1865	March 12, 1866	
Weaver, James Baird	Colonel	2nd Regiment Iowa Volunteer Infantry	Bvt. Brig. Gen. USV, March 13, 1865	April 10, 1866	
Webber, Alonzo Watson	Colonel	51st Regiment U.S. Colored Infantry	Bvt. Brig. Gen. USV, March 26, 1865	March 12, 1866	
Webber, Jules C.	Captain	Aide-de-Camp, USV	Bvt. Brig. Gen. USV, March 13, 1865	April 10, 1866	Also July 27, 1866
Weld, Stephen Minot Jr.	Colonel	56th Regiment Massachusetts Volunteer Infantry	Bvt. Brig. Gen. USV, March 13, 1865	March 12, 1866	
Welles, George E.	Colonel	68th Regiment Ohio Volunteer Infantry	Bvt. Brig. Gen. USV, March 13, 1865	April 10, 1866	
Wells, George Duncan	Colonel	34th Regiment Massachusetts Volunteer Infantry	Bvt. Brig. Gen. USV, October 12, 1864	February 14, 1865	Mortally wounded at Hupp's Hill near Cedar Creek, Virginia, October 13, 1864; posthumous nomination by Pres. Lincoln, December 12, 1864
Wells, Henry Horatio	Colonel	26th Regiment Michigan Volunteer Infantry	Bvt. Brig. Gen. USV, June 3, 1865	March 12, 1866	
Wells, Milton	Colonel	15th Regiment West Virginia Volunteer Infantry	Bvt. Brig. Gen. USV, March 13, 1865	March 28, 1867	
Welsh, William	Lt. Colonel	19th Regiment U.S. Colored Infantry	Bvt. Brig. Gen. USV, March 13, 1865	March 2, 1867	
Wentworth, Mark Fernald	Colonel	32nd Regiment Maine Volunteer Infantry	Bvt. Brig. Gen. USV, March 13, 1865	July 27, 1866	
West, Edward Walter	Lt. Colonel	33rd Regiment New Jersey Volunteer Infantry (appointed but not mustered in)	Bvt. Brig. Gen. USV, March 13, 1865	March 28, 1867	Commission not issued
West, Francis H.	Colonel	31st Regiment Wisconsin Volunteer Infantry	Bvt. Brig. Gen. USV, March 13, 1865	March 12, 1866	
West, George Warren	Colonel	17th Regiment Maine Volunteer Infantry	Bvt. Brig. Gen. USV, December 2, 1864	February 14, 1865	Nominated by Pres. Lincoln, December 14, 1864
West, Henry Rienza	Lt. Colonel	62nd Regiment Ohio Volunteer Infantry	Bvt. Brig. Gen. USV, July 13, 1865	March 12, 1866	Error corrected December 3, 1867
West, Robert Mayhew	Colonel	5th Regiment Pennsylvania Volunteer Cavalry	Bvt. Brig. Gen. USV, April 1, 1865	March 12, 1866	
Wever, Clark Russell	Colonel	17th Regiment Iowa Volunteer Infantry	Bvt. Brig. Gen. USV, February 9, 1865	February 14, 1865	
Wheelock, Charles	Major	97th Regiment New York Volunteer Infantry	Bvt. Brig. Gen. USV, August 9, 1864	February 20, 1865	Nominated by Pres. Lincoln, December 12, 1864
Wherry, William Macky	Major	Aide-de-Camp, USV	Bvt. Brig. Gen. USV, April 2, 1865	March 12, 1866	Medal of Honor
Whistler, Joseph Nelson Garland	Colonel	2nd Regiment New York Volunteer Heavy Artillery	Bvt. Brig. Gen. USV, March 13, 1865	March 12, 1866	
Whitaker, Edward Washburn	Lt. Colonel	1st Regiment Connecticut Volunteer Cavalry	Bvt. Brig. Gen. USV, March 13, 1865	March 12, 1866	Medal of Honor
Whitbeck, Horatio Nelson	Lt. Colonel	65th Regiment Ohio Volunteer Infantry	Bvt. Brig. Gen. USV, March 13, 1865	May 18, 1866	
White, Carr Bailey	Colonel	12th Regiment Ohio Volunteer Infantry	Bvt. Brig. Gen. USV, March 13, 1865	July 26, 1866	
White, Daniel	Colonel	31st Regiment Maine Volunteer Infantry	Bvt. Brig. Gen. USV, March 13, 1865	May 18, 1866	
White, David B.	Lt. Colonel	81st Regiment New York Volunteer Infantry	Bvt. Brig. Gen. USV, March 13, 1865	February 14, 1868	
White, Frank	Major	Asst. Adjutant Gen. USV,	Bvt. Brig. Gen. USV, March 13, 1865	March 12, 1866	
White, Frank J.	Lt. Colonel	2nd Regiment U.S. Colored Cavalry	Bvt. Brig. Gen. USV, March 13, 1865	April 26, 1866	
White, Harry	Major	67th Regiment Pennsylvania Volunteer Infantry	Bvt. Brig. Gen. USV, March 2, 1865	March 10, 1865	Nominated by Pres. Lincoln, March 2, 1865
Whiteley, Robert Henry Kirkwood	Lt. Colonel	Ordnance Dept., USA	Bvt. Brig. Gen. USA, March 13, 1865	July 25, 1866	
Whittelsey, Charles Henry	Captain	Asst. Adjutant Gen. USV,	Bvt. Brig. Gen. USV, March 13, 1865	February 21, 1867	
Whittelsey, Henry Martyn	Captain	Quartermaster Dept., USV	Bvt. Brig. Gen. USV, March 13, 1865	March 12, 1866	
Whittier, Charles Albert	Lt. Colonel	Asst. Adjutant Gen. USV	Bvt. Brig. Gen. USV, April 9, 1865	March 12, 1866	
Whittier, Francis Henry	Lt. Colonel	30th Regiment Massachusetts Volunteer Infantry	Bvt. Brig. Gen. USV, March 13, 1865	March 2, 1867	
Whittlesey, Eliphalet	Colonel	46th Regiment U.S. Colored Infantry	Bvt. Brig. Gen. USV, March 13, 1865	April 10, 1866	
Wilcox, James Andrew	Colonel	113th Regiment Ohio Volunteer Infantry	Bvt. Brig. Gen. USV, October 18, 1865	March 12, 1866	
Wilcox, John Shuler	Colonel	52nd Regiment Illinois Volunteer Infantry	Bvt. Brig. Gen. USV, March 13, 1865	February 6, 1867	
Wilder, John Thomas	Colonel	17th Regiment Indiana Volunteer Infantry	Bvt. Brig. Gen. USV, August 7, 1864	February 20, 1865	
Wildes, Thomas Francis	Colonel	186th Regiment Ohio Volunteer Infantry	Bvt. Brig. Gen. USV, March 11, 1865	March 11, 1865	Nominated by Pres. Lincoln, March 11, 1865
Wildrick, Abram Calvin	Colonel	39th Regiment New Jersey Volunteer Infantry	Bvt. Brig. Gen. USV, April 2, 1865	March 12, 1866	
Wiles, Greenbury F.	Colonel	78th Regiment Ohio Volunteer Infantry	Bvt. Brig. Gen. USV, March 13, 1865	March 12, 1866	
Wiley, Aquila	Colonel	41st Regiment Ohio Volunteer Infantry	Bvt. Brig. Gen. USV, March 13, 1865	July 23, 1866	
Wiley, Daniel Day	Captain	Commissary Gen. of Subsistence Dept., USV	Bvt. Brig. Gen. USV, March 13, 1865	February 14, 1868	
Williams, Adolphus Wesley	Colonel	20th Regiment Michigan Volunteer Infantry	Bvt. Brig. Gen. USV, March 13, 1865	February 21, 1867	
Williams, James Monroe	Colonel	79th Regiment U.S. Colored Infantry	Bvt. Brig. Gen. USV, February 13, 1865	March 3, 1865	Nominated by Pres. Lincoln, February 3, 1865; Resigned March 29, 1873. Appointed captain U.S. Army, January 7, 1891. Retired January 12, 1891
Williams, John	Captain	6th Regiment Iowa Volunteer Infantry	Bvt. Brig. Gen. USV, March 13, 1865	July 27, 1866	
Williams, Reuben	Colonel	12th Indiana Volunteer Infantry	Bvt. Brig. Gen. USV, March 13, 1865	March 12, 1866	
Williams, Robert	Major	Asst. Adjutant Gen. USA	Bvt. Brig. Gen. USA, March 13, 1865	May 4, 1866	
Williams, Thomas J.	Lt. Colonel	55th Regiment Kentucky Volunteer Infantry	Bvt. Brig. Gen. USV, September 22, 1865	March 12, 1866	
Willian, John	Lt. Colonel	8th Regiment New Jersey Volunteer Infantry	Bvt. Brig. Gen. USV, April 9, 1865	March 12, 1866	
Willson, Lester Sebestian	Lt. Colonel	60th Regiment New York Volunteer Infantry	Bvt. Brig. Gen. USV, March 13, 1865	March 2, 1867	
Wilson, James	Colonel	13th Regiment Iowa Volunteer Infantry	Bvt. Brig. Gen. USV, March 13, 1865	March 12, 1866	
Wilson, James Grant	Colonel	4th Regiment U.S. Colored Cavalry	Bvt. Brig. Gen. USV, March 13, 1865	March 2, 1867	
Wilson, Thomas	Lt. Colonel	Commissary Gen. of Subsistence Dept., USV	Bvt. Brig. Gen. USV, March 13, 1865; Bvt. Brig. Gen. USA, March 13, 1865	March 12, 1866	
Wilson, William	Colonel	6th Regiment New York Volunteer Infantry	Bvt. Brig. Gen. USV, March 13, 1865	July 26, 1866	
Wilson, William Tecumseh	Colonel	123rd Regiment Ohio Volunteer Infantry	Bvt. Brig. Gen. USV, March 13, 1865	March 12, 1866	
Winkler, Frederick Carl	Lt. Colonel	26th Regiment Wisconsin Volunteer Infantry	Bvt. Brig. Gen. USV, June 15, 1865	March 12, 1866	
Winslow, Bradley	Colonel	186th Regiment New York Volunteer Infantry	Bvt. Brig. Gen. USV, April 2, 1865	March 12, 1866	For assault at Siege of Petersburg, April 2, 1865
Winslow, Edward Francis	Colonel	4th Regiment Iowa Volunteer Cavalry	Bvt. Brig. Gen. USV, December 12, 1864	February 14, 1865	Chief of Cavalry, Staff of Maj. Gen. William T. Sherman
Winslow, Robert Emmett	Lt. Colonel	68th Regiment Pennsylvania Volunteer Infantry	Bvt. Brig. Gen. USV, March 13, 1865	July 26, 1866	Mexican–American War veteran
Winthrop, Frederick	Colonel	5th Regiment New York Veteran Volunteer Infantry	Bvt. Brig. Gen. USV, August 1, 1864; Bvt. Maj. Gen. USV, April 1, 1865	February 20, 1865; April 13, 1867	Brig. gen. brevet for Overland Campaign; Killed at Battle of Five Forks
Wise, George D.	Colonel	Quartermaster Dept., USV	Bvt. Brig. Gen. USV, March 13, 1865	March 12, 1866	
Wisewell, Moses N.	Colonel	6th Regiment Veteran Reserve Corps	Bvt. Brig. Gen. USV, March 13, 1865	February 16, 1869	For Battle of Fredericksburg
Wister, Langhorne	Colonel	150th Regiment Pennsylvania Volunteer Infantry	Bvt. Brig. Gen. USV, March 13, 1865	July 23, 1866	For battles of Fredericksburg, Chancellorsville, and Gettysburg
Witcher, John Seashoales	Lt. Colonel	3rd Regiment West Virginia Volunteer Cavalry	Bvt. Brig. Gen. USV, March 13, 1865	March 28, 1867	For Valley Campaigns of 1864 and Siege of Petersburg; U. S. House of Representatives, 1869–1871
Withington, William Herbert	Colonel	17th Regiment Michigan Volunteer Infantry	Bvt. Brig. Gen. USV, March 13, 1865	February 14, 1868	Medal of Honor for Battle of First Bull Run; Brevet for Battle of South Mountain
Wolfe, Edward H.	Colonel	52nd Regiment Indiana Volunteer Infantry	Bvt. Brig. Gen. USV, March 13, 1865	July 18, 1868	For Battle of Nashville
Wood, Henry Clay	Major	Assistant Adjutant General	Bvt. Brig. Gen. USV, March 13, 1865	March 3, 1869	Medal of Honor for Battle of Wilson's Creek
Wood, James Jr.	Colonel	136th New York Volunteer Infantry	Bvt. Brig. Gen. USV, March 8, 1865; Bvt. Maj. Gen. USV, March 13, 1865	March 10, 1865; May 18, 1866	
Wood, Oliver	Colonel	4th Regiment U.S. Veteran Volunteer Infantry	Bvt. Brig. Gen. USV, March 13, 1865	April 10, 1866	
Wood, Robert Crooke	Colonel	Asst. Surgeon General, USA	Bvt. Brig. Gen. USA, March 13, 1865	July 25, 1866	Died as Regular Army colonel, 1869
Wood, William D.	Colonel	11th Regiment Missouri Volunteer Cavalry	Bvt. Brig. Gen. USV, March 13, 1865	March 12, 1866	
Woodall, Daniel	Colonel	1st Regiment Delaware Volunteer Infantry	Bvt. Brig. Gen. USV, June 15, 1865	March 12, 1866	
Woodford, Stewart Lyndon	Colonel	103rd Regiment U.S. Colored Infantry	Bvt. Brig. Gen. USV, May 12, 1865	March 12, 1866	Lt. Gov. of New York, 1867–1869; U. S. House of Representatives, 1873–1874
Woodhull, Maxwell Van Zandt	Lt. Colonel	Asst. Adjutant Gen. USV	Bvt. Brig. Gen. USV, March 13, 1865	April 10, 1866	
Woodruff, Israel Carle	Lt. Colonel	Corps of Engineers, USA	Bvt. Brig. Gen. USA, March 13, 1865	March 2, 1867	USMA, 1836. Died as Regular Army colonel, 1878.
Woodward, Orpheus Saeger	Colonel	83rd Regiment Pennsylvania Volunteer Infantry	Bvt. Brig. Gen. USV, March 13, 1865	April 10, 1866	Lost right leg at Battle of the Wilderness
Woolley, John	Lt. Colonel	5th Regiment Indiana Volunteer Cavalry	Bvt. Brig. Gen. USV, March 13, 1865	March 12, 1866	
Wormer, Grover Salman	Colonel	30th Regiment Michigan Volunteer Infantry	Bvt. Brig. Gen. USV, March 13, 1865	March 28, 1867	
Wright, Ed	Lt. Colonel	24th Regiment Iowa Volunteer Infantry	Bvt. Brig. Gen. USV, March 13, 1865	April 10, 1866	Iowa Secretary of State, 1867–1873
Wright, Elias	Colonel	10th Regiment U.S. Colored Infantry	Bvt. Brig. Gen. USV, January 15, 1865	March 3, 1865	Mexican–American War veteran. Retired as Regular Army colonel, 1876
Wright, John Gibson	Lt. Colonel	51st Regiment New York Volunteer Infantry	Bvt. Brig. Gen. USV, March 13, 1865	April 10, 1866	
Wright, Joseph Jefferson Burr	Major	Surgeon, USA	Bvt. Brig. Gen. USA, March 13, 1865	February 23, 1867	
Wright, Thomas Forster	Colonel	2nd Regiment California Volunteer Infantry	Bvt. Brig. Gen. USV, March 13, 1865	February 6, 1867	Attended USMA. Killed in action fighting in the Modoc War at Battle of Lava Beds, Oregon, April 26, 1873

== Union brevet generals; lower actual, substantive grade ==
=== Y ===
Name	Highest actual grade	Unit	Brevet grade, rank date	Date confirmed	Notes, other dates
Yates, Henry Jr.	Colonel	106th Regiment Illinois Volunteer Infantry	Bvt. Brig. Gen. USV, March 13, 1865	July 26, 1866	Brother of Governor of Illinois Richard Yates
Yeoman, Stephen B.	Colonel	43rd Regiment U.S. Colored Infantry	Bvt. Brig. Gen. USV, March 13, 1865	March 12, 1866	
Yorke, Louis Eugene	Lt. Colonel	Asst. Inspector Gen. USV	Bvt. Brig. Gen. USV, March 13, 1865	March 12, 1866	Mustered out and resigned from Regular Army, November 21, 1865
Young, Samuel Baldwin Marks	Colonel	4th Regiment Pennsylvania Volunteer Cavalry	Bvt. Brig. Gen. USV, April 9, 1865	February 6, 1867	For Appomattox Campaign. Spanish–American War major general. Retired as Lieutenant General, 1904.
Young, Thomas Lowry	Colonel	118th Regiment Ohio Volunteer Infantry	Bvt. Brig. Gen. USV, March 13, 1865	April 10, 1866	For Battle of Resaca, Georgia. Lt. Governor of Ohio, 1876–1877. Governor of Ohio, 1877–1878. U. S. House of Representatives, 1879–1883.

== Union brevet generals; lower actual, substantive grade ==
=== Z ===
Name	Highest actual grade	Unit	Brevet grade, rank date	Date confirmed	Notes, other dates
Zahm, Lewis	Colonel	3rd Regiment Ohio Volunteer Cavalry	Bvt. Brig. Gen. USV, March 13, 1865	March 26, 1867	
Ziegler, George Milton	Colonel	52nd Regiment U.S. Colored Infantry	Bvt. Brig. Gen. USV, March 13, 1865	April 10, 1866	
Zinn, George	Colonel	57th Regiment Pennsylvania Volunteer Infantry	Bvt. Brig. Gen. USV, April 6, 1865	March 12, 1866	
Zulick, Samuel Morton	Colonel	29th Regiment Pennsylvania Volunteer Infantry	Bvt. Brig. Gen. USV, March 13, 1865	March 12, 1866	Physician and railroad official before the war; real estate agent after the war.

== See also ==
- List of American Civil War generals (Union)
- List of American Civil War generals (Confederate)
- List of American Civil War generals (Acting Confederate)
- General officers in the Confederate States Army
- General officers in the United States
