= Hannah Jenkins Barnard =

Quaker minister (1754–1825)

- Born: Hannah Jenkins; 1754; Dutchess County, New York (Note: Bacon and Jensen state that she was born in Nantucket and lived in Hudson, New York. There was a Hannah Jenkins who visited Nantucket, but that was in 1742 and Jenkins was from Philadelphia.)
- Died: November 27, 1825 (aged 70–71); Hudson, New York or Nantucket, Massachusetts
- Occupation: Quaker minister
- Known for: Being treated as a heretic and disowned for her religious beliefs

Hannah Jenkins Barnard (1754 – 27 November 1825) was a Quaker (Society of Friends) minister from Dutchess County, New York. Early in her career, she was active throughout New York and then New England. She was considered an "eloquent speaker" and was esteemed among fellow Quakers. She became interested in traveling across the Atlantic Ocean to speak at meetings in England, Ireland, and Scotland. Because she was a woman, it took two years before she received approval for the trip.

Barnard was a proponent of the Inward light doctrine that claims it is more important to rely on one's own beliefs than to strictly follow biblical passages. The group of people with this belief was called the New Lights. These doctrines were in opposition to the beliefs of the evangelical branch of the Quakers.

Fellow Quaker minister Elizabeth Coggeshall traveled with Barnard in 1798 to England, Scotland, and Ireland where they visited Friends Meetings. By 1800, Barnard was charged with heresy at the Yearly Meeting in London. She was subject to fourteen months of proceedings before she returned to the United States with Coggeshall.

In 1801, she published "An Appeal to Ethics Society of Friends, on the Primitive Simplicity of the Christian Principle and Discipline". One year later, she was disowned (Quaker term for excommunicated) by the Hudson Meeting. In 1804, a document attributed to Thomas Foster, "A Narrative of the Proceedings in America, of the Society called Quakers in the Case of Hannah Barnard" was published about Barnard's liberal viewpoints that were preached to Quakers.

She was described by Quaker historian Rufus M. Jones as the "leading champion in the first years of the nineteenth century of a freer type of thought in the Society."

== Personal life ==
Hannah Jenkins was born in 1754 and was said to be born in Dutchess County, New York in the Hudson River Valley to Valentine Jenkins and his wife. Her father was a farmer and her parents raised her as a Baptist. It is believed that Valentine moved his family to the Oblong Patent (Oblong Friends Meeting House in Quaker Hill, New York) around 1764 and joined the local Meeting. She did not receive any schooling, and remained illiterate until adolescence due to her family's poverty but she possessed "considerable native intelligence". Hannah Jenkins joined the Quakers in 1773, around the age of 18, at Oblong Friends Meeting House.

Hannah Jenkins married Peter Barnard, a widower with three children, at the Oblong Friends Meeting House in Quaker Hill, New York on October 20, 1779. Peter was born to Quaker parents in Nantucket, Massachusetts, a community that suffered economically during the Revolutionary War. Many families moved west to New York, many settling in Hudson, New York. Peter was described as a congenial, kind, and happy man.

The Barnards were of modest means, living in a frame house built by Peter in 1780, in which they established themselves, as a carter and a minister respectively. In July 1784, they received approval to remove for to Hudson, New York. At that time they had three children and a young woman apprentice who moved with the family. At the time of her trip to the British Isles (1798–1801), Coggeshall had two daughters.

== Early ministry ==
By 1786, Barnard was a representative of the Friends eight times at the New York Quarterly Meeting. She also became one of the representatives of the Nine Partners Quarterly Meeting, which spanned the areas of the Hudson River, north of Millbrook. She went on to become a representative for the New York Yearly Meeting in 1793, 1794, and 1796.

She became an accredited minister in the early 1790s. During the same period as her first year representing the New York Yearly Meeting, she was authorized to travel through New England, simultaneously serving on the Nine Partners School Board from 1795-1796. Barnard was highly regarded by the Friends during this period, and she was noted as an "eloquent speaker". Barnard was also known for her powerful ministry work throughout the Friends community, particularly in her home base in Hudson. In the same meetings that would later condemn her, (Note: She was a member of the Hudson Meeting and a representative for the Nine Partners Quarterly and New York Yearly Meetings.) Barnard was certified or endorsed in late 1797 for the trip. The Hudson Meeting, including her husband Peter, attested that she was "sound and edifying, attended with a comfortable evidence of her call there unto."

In 1796, Barnard had asked permission from the Quarterly meeting to travel to the British Isles to engage with the Friends in that region and to gauge the religious environment. At the time, it was difficult for women to assert their status in the Friends community. Although Barnard was highly regarded by the Meeting groups and the School Board, it took two years for her to gain permission to embark on the trip.

In the 1790s, Barnard was one of the people who ran the Nine Partners Boarding School in Hudson, which was attended by Lucretia Coffin, later known by her married name Lucretia Mott.

== Time abroad and disownment ==
Barnard arrived in Falmouth in July 1798. She and a female companion, a single mother named Elizabeth Coggeshall from Rhode Island, visited Scotland, Ireland, and England as a missionary "to spread the gospel message". They were also to convince the Quaker hierarchy in London to adopt a liberal policy that would allow ministers of other churches to use citizens' homes to preach, in return for the lending of their churches to the Friends.

=== New Lights and evangelicals ===
Toward the end of the 18th-century, a chasm occurred within the Quaker faith when some members adopted the principle of Inward light, looking to one's own experience of God, rather than strict interpretation of biblical passages, which was held by the evangelical branch. Abraham Shackleton (1752–1818), a leader of Irish Quakers, was considered a rebel for promoting inspiration through one's own "light" and not accepting bible passages that conflicted with their own experience. Under Shackleton's leadership, British Quakers began to reject strict, traditional readings of the Old Testament, which they deemed to be a violation of the Quakers’ testament to peace, in lieu of more liberal teachings. This differed greatly from the evangelical branch that was on the ascend in England. Those who were inspired by their own light were disowned for their beliefs. In Britain, the Quakers were divided over doctrinal differences by class, the poor and the wealthy, who had more power within the faith.

=== Visits throughout the British Isles ===
Barnard and Coggeshall received a warm reception during their first 10 months in the British Isles, particularly in Cornwall where they met with "kinder spirited sober Methodists" who were open to learning about Quakerism. The two women then went to Ireland in late 1799.

Barnard quickly fell into Shackleton's group, called the "New Lights", which caused increasing tension between the American travelers and the committee of Friends in Britain. Barnard's teachings, although not widely published, emphasize a need for balance in religious discourse, “even to the point of her advocating the critical examination of tenets that the orthodox placed beyond questioning: the miraculous conception, the historical validity of certain miracles that Christ worked, and the vicarious atonement for the sins of mankind”. She believed in reason and ethics more than dogmatic theology. Barnard was a pacificist who believed that "war occurred because of human passion, not divine authorization." She questioned the accuracy of some of the Bible passages in the Old Testament.

While Barnard and Coggeshall were in Ireland, an American minister named David Sands heard of her teachings and was taken aback by them. Despite the shock given to a great deal of traditional British and Irish Quakers, Barnard's teachings became popular with the communities she reached, and she was granted a certificate of approval from the Irish Committee of Friends in 1800, just before leaving the country.

=== Trial and disownment ===
Barnard returned to England in May 1800 and requested to journey onward to Germany with Coggeshall, but this request was denied, with opposition from David Sands and an Irish elder, Joseph Williams. (Note: Williams had attended the meeting in Ireland where Barnard was endorsed, and he did not object to her certification. It is believed that the case against Barnard was largely initiated by David Sands.) Instead, Barnard was extradited and investigated for heresy in Britain. No unanimous decision could be made about her guilt or innocence. The London Quarterly Meeting entirely censured her teachings and she was subject to fourteen months of trials in England. In her correspondence with Martha Routh, Barnard emphasized the treatment she faced in the British Isles. She wrote that she felt her ministry was being degraded and censured unjustly. Throughout her correspondence with Routh, Barnard discusses their time as friends, and her ideas of God as a being of love, and a being of order. (Note: During her time on trial, Barnard exchanged many letters with the members of her inner circle, including Samuel Weatherill, a cloth manufacturer from Philadelphia, and Martha Routh, a fellow Quaker Minister from Hudson, New York.) Samuel Weatherill, who had been disowned from his Philadelphia Meeting group in 1779 for his support for the Revolutionary cause and Quaker progressivism, was another correspondent during the trial proceedings. With Weatherill, she noted how the London Yearly Meetings considered her to be overly rational, and then removed from her Hudson Meeting group as a result of this judgment. She compared her exile to bringing the darkness to light, insinuating that her removal from the Friends is more telling about their own religious and political motivations than the validity of her convictions.

Barnard was restricted from preaching to Quakers in the British Isles. After the trials, Barnard set sail for the United States in August 1801 and arrived at her home in the late fall of 1801.

The London Quarterly had swiftly reported her to the Friends Quarterly and Yearly Meeting committees in Hudson, who were quick to disown Barnard from their Meetings. She was charged once more in 1801 in Hudson, New York, with heresy, and found herself going through a similar process as she had in England. This time, the court was determined to reach a proper judgment. By the end of 1801, Barnard was formally expelled from all Meeting groups in the Hudson, and was not allowed to return to the British Isles to reconnect with the Friends there.

In 1802 she became ill, though she did not identify the illness with which she was afflicted. In June 1802, she was disowned from the Hudson Friends, partly due to the disownment by the London Meeting as well as what they described as a contentious disposition during the local proceedings. Despite her illness, and loss of community, Barnard did not grieve her former membership and ministry. She had told a friend that if the Society of Friends admitted that they made a mistake in judging and disowning her, she would return to the Hudson Meeting. Upon her death, the New York Christian Inquirer stated that although disowned, she was loyal to the Society of Friends.

== Later years ==
Barnard became a member of the Unitarian Church, which was an alternative for "New Lights" Quakers.

She established a peace society in Hudson after the War of 1812. In 1820, she and her husband published "Dialogues on Domestic and Rural Economy, and The Fashionable Follies of The World". Written to improve a woman's position within the household through practical and productive skills, it was the only book of the time written for rural women. It offered solutions to specific problems or tasks, which were written in story form.

Barnard died in 1825 and her husband Peter died in 1830. (Note: Both spouses died in Hudson, New York, but there are Massachusetts, U.S., Town and Vital Records, 1620-1988 that say that they both died in Nantucket.) He had remained a Quaker, attending the Hudson Meeting until his death. They are both buried in the Hudson City Cemetery.

== Source ==
- Maxey, David W. (1989). "New Light on Hannah Barnard, A Quaker "Heretic"". Quaker History. 78 (2): 61–86. ISSN 0033-5053. JSTOR 41947143.
