= Shorehaven, New York =

- Census-designated place
- Location within New York Location within the United States
- Coordinates: 41°33′24″N 73°40′2″W
- Country: United States
- State: New York
- County: Dutchess
- Town: Pawling

Area
  - Total: 1.80 sq mi (4.67 km^{2})
  - Land: 1.37 sq mi (3.55 km^{2})
  - Water: 0.43 sq mi (1.11 km^{2})
- Elevation: 760 ft (230 m)

Population (2020)
  - Total: 686
  - Density: 500.3/sq mi (193.17/km^{2})
- Time zone: UTC-5 (Eastern (EST))
  - Summer (DST): UTC-4 (EDT)
- ZIP Code: 12531 (Holmes)
- Area code: 845
- FIPS code: 36-67207
- GNIS feature ID: 2806931

Shorehaven is a census-designated place (CDP) in the town of Pawling in Dutchess County, New York, United States. It was first listed as a CDP prior to the 2020 census. As of the 2020 census, Shorehaven had a population of 686.

Shorehaven is in southeastern Dutchess County, along the western edge of the town of Pawling. The CDP is bordered to the west by the town of Beekman. The community surrounds Whaley Lake, which drains north via Whaley Lake Stream to Fishkill Creek, a southwestward-flowing tributary of the Hudson River. New York State Route 292 runs through Shorehaven along the western side of Whaley Lake. The state highway leads north 2 miles (3 km) to NY 55 in West Pawling and southeast 6 miles (10 km) to Patterson.

== Demographics ==
Historical population
| Census | Pop. | Note | %± |
|---|---|---|---|
| 2020 | 686 | | — |
U.S. Decennial Census
