= Elizabeth Coggeshall =

Quaker minister (1754–1825)

- Born: Elizabeth Hosier; March 4, 1770 (Note: Elizabeth Hosier was also said to have been born on March 14, 1770.); Newport, Rhode Island
- Died: June 6, 1851 (aged 81) (Note: She is also said to have died on June 20, 1851. According to an extract of the New York Evening Post, Coggeshall, widow of Caleb Coggeshall, died on the morning of June 20, 1851.)
- Occupation: Quaker minister
- Known for: Quaker missionary work and traveling to the British Isles with Hannah Jenkins Barnard, who was disowned for preaching New Light doctrine

Elizabeth (née Hosier) Coggeshall (March 4, 1770 — June 6, 1851) was a Quaker (Society of Friends) minister and missionary from Rhode Island who traveled and worked throughout the United States and overseas.

== Personal life ==
Elizabeth Hosier was born on the fourth or fourteenth of March 1770 in Newport, Rhode Island, the daughter of Giles and Elizabeth (née Martin) Hosier (also spelled Hossier). They raised her in the Quaker faith, and provided hospitality for Quakers who were traveling, a tradition that she followed when she had her own home. She had an "animated and sprightly" disposition, but she was somewhat serious.

Elizabeth Hosier married Caleb Coggeshall in Nantucket, Massachusetts, on October 3, 1793, becoming Elizabeth Coggeshall. Caleb, the son of Job Coggeshall, was born on August 28, 1758, in Nantucket. The Coggeshalls moved to New York in 1802.

Caleb died on January 1, 1847, in New York City. He was interred at Friends Grounds in Houston, New York. Coggeshall died on June 4 or June 20, 1851, in New York City.

== Minister ==
With some hesitation, Coggeshall accepted a call to the ministry, speaking for the first time in March 1795. She became a minister the following year.

=== Overseas trip (1798–1801) ===
She decided in 1797 that she wanted to travel to the British Isles and the European Continent for ministerial work. She was apprehensive to take the trip, leaving a thirteen-month-old child at home, but she had the support of her husband and her parents to make the trip. She had found a fellow Quaker minister, Hannah Jenkins Barnard, to travel with her. She was advised to be independent of Barnard in her ministry. (Note: Hannah Jenkins Barnard's name is not mentioned in Coggeshall's Memorial by the New York Meeting.)

Coggeshall and Barnard arrived in Falmouth, Cornwall in July 1798. They traveled to England, followed by Scotland and Wales, where they attended almost all of the Quaker meetings. After that, they traveled 1700 miles throughout Ireland and attended 150 meetings. Over time, Barnard had developed her own interpretation of Quaker beliefs.

The women attended the London Yearly Meeting in June 1800, where Coggeshall's companion (Barnard) was told that the members of the Meeting did not approve of the opinions she expressed when she was preaching and they would not authorize the women's trip to the European Continent. Leaving Barnard, another companion was found for Coggeshall who preached at meetings in the British Isles until March 9, 1801. She boarded the Alleghany on March 30, 1801, in Liverpool, which was bound for the United States. (Note: She was separated from her husband for four years, his having been away when she left for the British Isles, and he was bound for England while she made her return trip back to New York.)

=== American meeting visits ===
Coggeshall traveled to all the Quaker Meetings in the United States over a thirteen-year period. A visit was made to Anna Coffin and Lucretia Coffin Mott of the Coffin whaling family, where Coggeshall discussed Inward light with the attendees. For Mott, this strengthened her belief in one's own ability to ascertain what is right and wrong, and how one might interpret the veracity of biblical passages or church doctrine. Mott was very interested to hear of Hannah Jenkins Barnard, who was disowned by the Quakers in 1802 for her religious beliefs (New Lights) that were at odds with the evangelical Quakers.

=== Overseas trip (1813–1815) ===
In 1813, as the War of 1812 was fought between America and England, she traveled to England. It was very difficult to find passage between the two countries, but she was able to sail on a ship transporting prisoners of war. She arrived in Liverpool on May 8, 1813. She had religious engagements throughout Great Britain and, with the approval of the London Meeting, in the continent of Europe. Traveling with Elder Joseph Marriage and a minister, Sarah Hustler, she visited meetings in France, Germany, and Switzerland. After three months in Europe, she returned to England and then visited meetings in Scotland, Ireland, Wales, and England. She sailed from Liverpool on August 15, 1815. It was a protracted and perilous trip, during which food was rationed, finally landing in New York on November 13, 1815. She received testimonials about her ministry from Quakers from Ireland, England, France, and Germany.

=== Final years ===
In 1817 and 1818, she visited all the meetings represented in the New York Yearly Meeting and the New England Yearly Meeting, respectively. She continued to attend yearly meetings and local meetings in 1819, 1821, 1833–1837, 1839, and 1840. In her final year, she visited the half-years meeting in Canada. Having retired, she spent much of her time at home with her husband. They attended meetings when they were able.

== Source ==
- Maxey, David W. (1989). "New Light on Hannah Barnard, A Quaker "Heretic"". Quaker History. 78 (2): 61–86. ISSN 0033-5053. JSTOR 41947143.
- Society of Friends New York (1852). "Memorial of the Monthly Meeting of New York concerning Elizabeth Coggeshall". Memorials Concerning Several Ministers and Others, Deceased: Of the Religious Society of Friends. New York: Mahlon Day & Company.
