= Pawling (town), New York =

Pawling
- Town
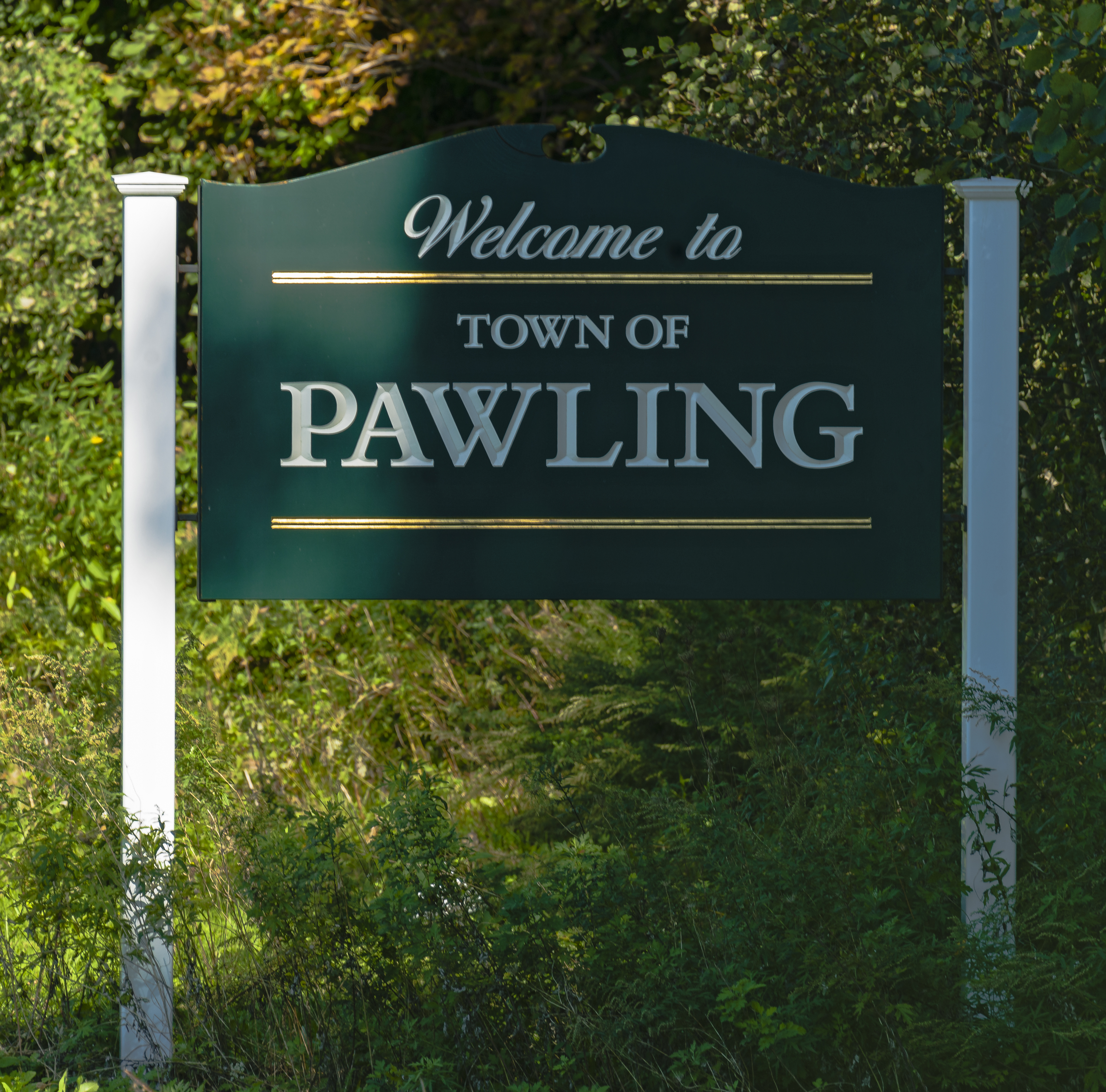
- Town welcome sign along New York State Route 22

- Coat of arms
- Etymology: From Catherine Pauling, wife of Albert Pauling, and eldest daughter of colonial landowner Henry Beekman. The town received its name after a newspaper published a typo: Pawling.
- Location of Pawling, New York
- Coordinates: 41°34′N 73°36′W
- Country: United States
- State: New York
- Region: Hudson Valley
- County: Dutchess
- Founded: 1788

Government
  - Town Supervisor: James Schmitt (R)
  - Town Council: Philip DeRosa (R); Corinne Musella-Pitt (R); Jim McCarthy (R); Coleen Snow (D)

Area
  - Total: 45 sq mi (120 km^{2})
  - Land: 44.2 sq mi (114 km^{2})
  - Water: 0.8 sq mi (2.1 km^{2})
- Elevation: 479 ft (146 m)

Population (2020)
  - Total: 8,012
  - Density: 181/sq mi (70.0/km^{2})
- Time zone: UTC-5 (EST)
  - Summer (DST): UTC-4 (EDT)
- ZIP Codes: 12564 (Pawling); 12531 (Holmes)
- Area code: 845
- Exchange: 855
- GNIS feature ID: 0979347
- Website: pawling.org

Pawling is a town in Dutchess County, New York, United States. Its population was 8,012 at the 2020 census. The town is named after Catherine Pauling, the daughter of Henry Beekman, who held the second largest land patent in the county. The town is in the southeastern part of the county, and contains a village of the same name.

== History ==
A part of the town was involved in a boundary problem involving New York and Connecticut. A section of the town, located in the "Oblong"—the name was given to the disputed oblong strip of land, two miles in width forming part of the Eastern boundary of the now Dutchess and Putnam Counties—was settled by Nathan Birdsall and his wife Jane Langdon; they were the first pioneer settlers of Quaker Hill, Dutchess, NY. He was a native of Long Island and was born around 1700 to Quaker parents. He was one of the surveyors of the area and picked his home site during the survey.

Nathan purchased his land from the Great Nine Partners Patent, prior to moving his family there, erected a log house and barn, probably around 1720. The next settler was Benjamin Ferris, a Quaker preacher. It was not until 1731, when the one-hundred-year-old dispute as to the boundary between the English in New England and the Dutch in New York was settled, that emigration started in any volume. A number of Friends began coming from Harrisons Purchase, now a part of Rye, in Westchester County, New York. Their Quaker Meeting House is still standing today, and open for visitors.

In the American Revolution colonial commander in chief George Washington established his headquarters at the John Kane House in the town (now the village) for two months in 1778. The town was founded in 1788, but part of the town was used to form the neighboring town of Dover in 1807. The town of Pawling was part of the Beekman Patent, a large land grant to Col. Henry Beekman in 1697.

== Geography ==
According to the United States Census Bureau, the town has a total area of 45.0 square miles (117 km^{2}), of which 44.2 square miles (114 km^{2}) is land and 0.8 square miles (2.1 km^{2}) (1.80%) is water.

The eastern and western section of the towns are high and hilly, with the Great Swamp and Harlem Valley in the middle, where the village of Pawling is located. The highest elevation in town is Observatory Hill, at 1,332 feet (406 m) above sea level; the lowest is 420 feet (130 m), in the Great Swamp, along the southern boundary of the town.

Most of the population of Pawling is concentrated in the valley, traversed by NY 22 (joined by NY 55 south of the village) and Metro-North Railroad's Harlem Line. There are two train stations in town, the Pawling station in the village and the Appalachian Trail station, allowing passengers to hike that trail up into the Pawling Nature Reserve along Hammersly Ridge in the northern section of town.

The southern town line is the border of Putnam County, New York, and the eastern town boundary is the border of Connecticut. To the west lies the town of Beekman, with Dover to the north. It also shares a small border with the town of East Fishkill at the southwestern edge of the town.

=== Communities, locations and notable places in Pawling ===
- Baker Corner – a hamlet east of Hurd Corners.
- Holmes – a hamlet in the southwestern part of the town.
- Hurd Corners – a hamlet north of Pawling village.
- Quaker Hill – a hamlet near the eastern town line, northeast of Pawling village.
- Pawling – a village in the town.
- Shorehaven – a hamlet in the western part of the town.
- West Pawling – a hamlet on Route 55, northwest of Pawling village.
- Whaley Lake – a lake by the western town line.
- Woodinville – a hamlet west of Pawling village.

== Demographics ==
Historical population
Census	Pop.	Note	%±
1820	1,804		—
1830	1,705		−5.5%
1840	1,571		−7.9%
1850	1,720		9.5%
1860	1,743		1.3%
1870	1,760		1.0%
1880	2,006		14.0%
1890	1,949		−2.8%
1900	1,921		−1.4%
1910	1,927		0.3%
1920	1,955		1.5%
1930	2,391		22.3%
1940	2,752		15.1%
1950	2,891		5.1%
1960	3,938		36.2%
1970	4,764		21.0%
1980	5,795		21.6%
1990	5,947		2.6%
2000	7,521		26.5%
2010	8,463		12.5%
2020	8,012		−5.3%
U.S. Decennial Census

As of the census of 2000, there were 7,521 people, 2,823 households, and 1,987 families living in the town. The population density was 170.2 inhabitants per square mile (65.7/km^{2}). There were 3,101 housing units at an average density of 70.2 per square mile (27.1/km^{2}). The racial makeup of the town was 94.43% white, 1.46% black or African American, .17% Native American, 1.28% Asian, .04% Pacific Islander, 1.3% from other races, and 1.32% from two or more races. Hispanic or Latino of any race were 4.85% of the population.

There were 2,823 households, out of which 33.8% had children under the age of 18 living with them, 59.6% were married couples living together, 7.4% had a female householder with no husband present, and 29.6% were non-families. 24.7% of all households were made up of individuals, and 10.6% had someone living alone who was 65 years of age or older. The average household size was 2.62 and the average family size was 3.16.

In the town, the population was spread out, with 25.3% under the age of 18, 5.3% from 18 to 24, 29.3% from 25 to 44, 24.9% from 45 to 64, and 15.2% who were 65 years of age or older. The median age was 40 years. For every 100 females, there were 95.8 males. For every 100 females age 18 and over, there were 92.4 males.

The median income for a household in the town was $61,380 and the median income for a family was $70,056. Males had a median income of $47,143 versus $35,063 for females. The per capita income for the town was $30,043. About 1.7% of families and 3.3% of the population were below the poverty line, including 1.2% of those under age 18 and 4.1% of those age 65 or over.

== Government ==
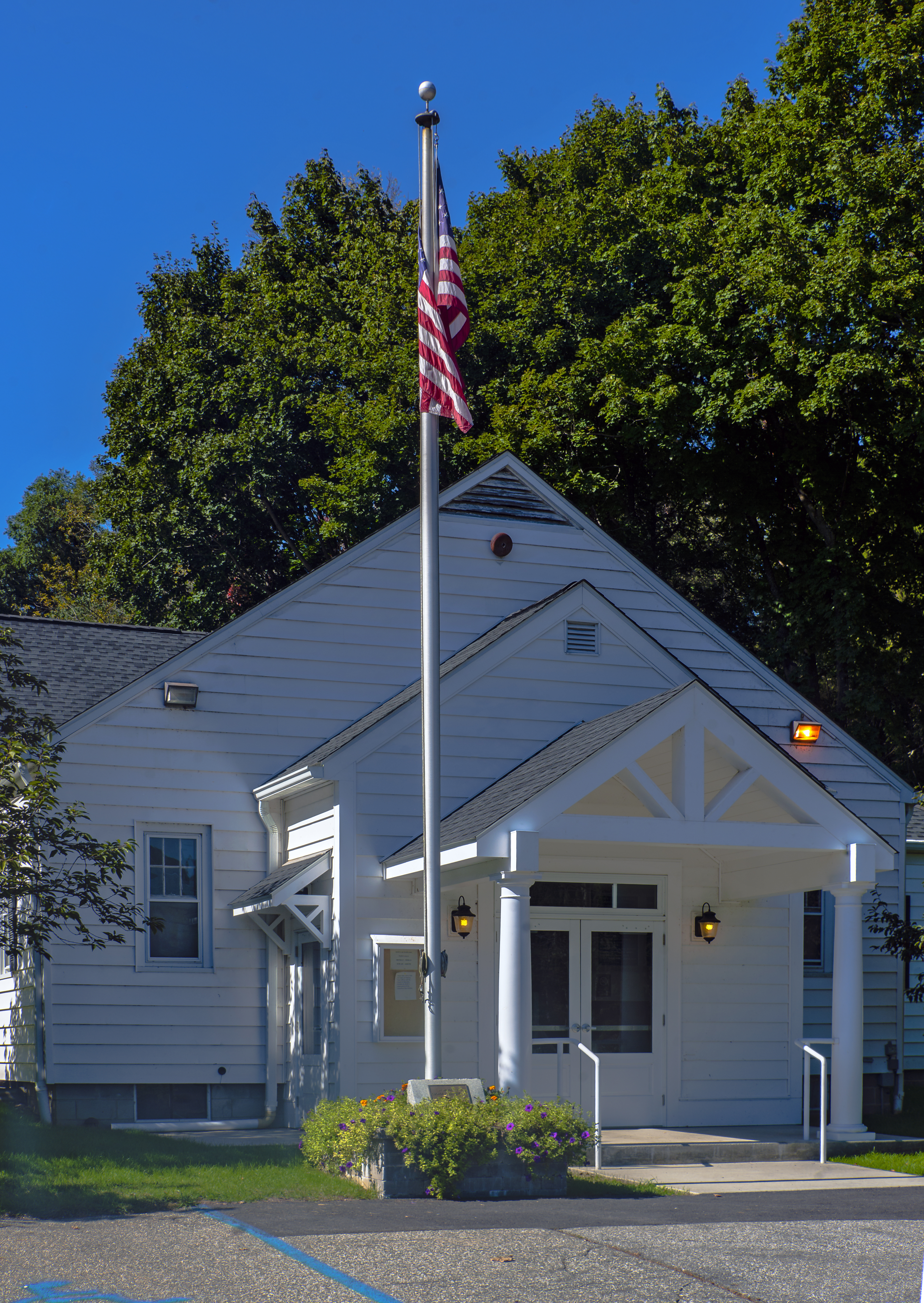
Town hall

Since 1878 Pawling has operated under a council-manager form of government.

== Infrastructure ==
=== Fire ===
The Pawling Fire District is the fire department that covers the Town Of Pawling. By keeping buildings up to code, controlling illegal occupancies, monitoring the safety of living-areas and issuing licenses and permits, the department works to control the potential for dangerous situations. The fire district operates three fire stations spread out all over the town, as their district covers a large area. The department is capable of handling fires, rescues, extrications and natural disasters. The PFD operates a varied fire apparatus fleet, however does not provide Emergency Medical Services. Both BLS and ALS EMS calls are handled by Empress Ambulance (formerly EMStar, which was merged in Sept 2021) who are contracted to provide the town with 24/7 ambulance service. In the event of numerous calls within a short amount of time, ambulances are pulled from neighboring towns including Beekman, Dover and Patterson or, if a backfill unit is available, it will respond from nearby.

=== Police ===
Police protection in Pawling is provided by through the Dutchess County Sheriff's office and New York State Police. Sheriff's deputies have a substation located in the middle of the hamlet, near the train station. The MTA police also cover the center of town, as the Metro-North Railroad Harlem Line has a train station in the town.

=== Medical ===
Pawling has several free standing doctors' offices and clinics, including Village Medical and The Atrium. Pawling has no hospitals, but within a short distance from town are three medical centers and two hospitals. MidHudson Regional Hospital of Westchester Medical Center and Vassar Brothers Medical Center are located in nearby Poughkeepsie, and Danbury Hospital is located in Danbury, CT. Putnam Hospital Center is located in Carmel in Putnam County and New Milford Hospital in New Milford, CT. There are several urgent care centers located nearby, including in Carmel and LaGrange.

== Notable people ==
- Kris Carr (born 1971), author.
- Brian Crecente (born 1970), journalist and columnist.
- Federico De Laurentiis (1955–1981), Italian film producer, is buried in Pawling Cemetery.
- Thomas E. Dewey (1902–1971), Governor of New York (1943–1955), unsuccessful Republican nominee for U.S. Presidency in 1944 and 1948, and partner of Dewey, Ballantine, Bushby, Palmer & Wood. Dewey lived on a large farm called "Dapplemere," located in the Quaker Hill community on the outskirts of Pawling.
- John B. Dutcher, farmer, businessman, banker and politician; first President of the Village of Pawling.
- William Pearce Howland, one of the Fathers of Canadian Confederation.
- John Kerr Branch (1865–1930), wealthy scion and financier, and his wife Beulah Frances Gould Branch (1860–1952).
- James Earl Jones (1931–2024), actor.
- Paul Tudor Jones, commodity trader.
- Helen Lester, children's author and creator of Tacky the Penguin.
- Charles H. Marsh, awarded a Medal of Honor for his actions in the Civil War.
- Marie Mattingly Meloney, magazine editor.
- Edward R. Murrow, famed radio and television broadcasting pioneer; his ashes were scattered at his estate, Glen Arden Farm. The local park is named after him.
- Aaron Neville, R&B singer and musician. Runs a vegetable farm with his wife on Quaker Hill.
- Soledad O'Brien, American broadcast journalist and executive producer.
- Norman Vincent Peale (1898–1993), Christian preacher and author of The Power of Positive Thinking and a founder of Guideposts magazine, died in town. The Peale Center for Christian Living still operates in Pawling.
- George T. Pierce, lawyer and politician.
- Sally Jessy Raphael, talk show host; owns a home on Quaker Hill.
- Jean Rouverol, author, actress and screenwriter.
- Jean Tabaud (1914-1996), portrait painter and war artist.
- Lowell Thomas, developed the Quaker Hill community in Pawling, where he lived when not traveling.
- John J. Toffey, awarded a Medal of Honor for his actions in the Civil War.
- John Lorimer Worden (1818–1897), U.S. Navy rear admiral; commanded the Union Navy's ironclad USS Monitor in its famous battle with the CSS Virginia (formerly USS Merrimack) during the American Civil War. Buried in Pawling Cemetery.
- William Bernard Ziff, Jr., (1930–2006), American publishing executive.

== Notable places ==
- Akin Free Library, historic eclectic late Victorian stone building - home to the Gunnison Museum of Natural History and Historical Society of Quaker Hill and Pawling.
- Daryl's House, concert venue and restaurant located in the former home of the famous Towne Crier Cafe, owned by Daryl Hall, musician.
- The Dover Oak, oldest and largest oak tree on the Appalachian Trail. Named for the road on which it stands, not the town it resides in.
- John Kane House, used by George Washington as his headquarters when the Continental Army was garrisoned on Purgatory Hill.
- Starkdale Farm, a now derelict farm formerly run by Cyrus Stark, filming location for an episode of the CBS series Elementary and epicenter of activity for filming of the John Krasinski film "A Quiet Place".
- Oblong Friends Meeting House, a late 18th-century Friends Meeting House of the Religious Society of Friends in the hamlet of Quaker Hill.
- Peale History Center and Library, commemorating the life and teachings of Dr. Norman Vincent Peale, the creator of "The Power of Positive Thinking" and founder of Guideposts.
- Trinity-Pawling School, an all-boys boarding school.
- Whaley Lake
- Pawling Free Library, positioned in the center of the Village in their 1964 brick building, and Victorian era Annex, the library is a center for lifelong learning and enquiry in Pawling. The Library has its roots in the Pawling Literary Society, which was founded in 1879 and housed in the now defunct Pawling Institute.
