= Warren Hugh Wilson =

American rural sociologist (1867–1937)

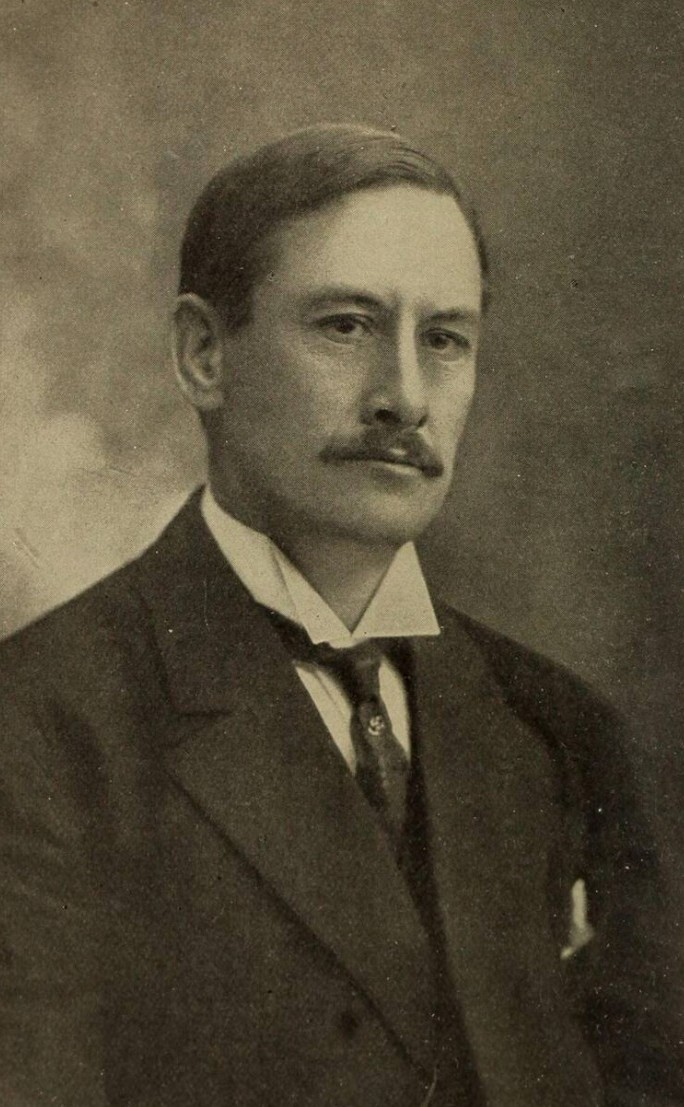
- Born: May 1, 1867; Tidioute, Pennsylvania, U.S.
- Died: March 1, 1937 (aged 69); New York City, U.S.

Academic background
- Education: Oberlin College (BA); Union Theological Seminary (BD); Columbia University (PhD)

Academic work
- Discipline: Sociology
- Sub-discipline: Rural Sociology
- Institutions: Board of Home Commission of Presbyterian Church; Department of Church Life of Presbyterian Church

Warren Hugh Wilson (May 1, 1867 – March 1, 1937) was an American pioneering contributor to early rural sociology and the Country Life Movement; and a leader within the Board of Home Missions of the Presbyterian Church. He is one of the first sociologists to study rural life and the church. In 1942, the Dorland-Bell School for Girls and the Asheville Farm School for Boys merged and was renamed to Warren Wilson College to honor Warren Hugh Wilson's contributions to rural America. Specifically, he urged the community to adapt and update their historical Appalachian ways to changing conditions in the region, which included training and education for rural people.

His published works include twelve books and pamphlets, thirteen periodical articles, seven parts of a series, six addresses, and seventeen surveys,. Throughout his career as a pastor and sociologist, he created a model for all Christian denominations with parishes in the countryside.

== Early life ==
Warren Wilson was born in Tidioute, Pennsylvania, which is a rural community in northwestern Pennsylvania. He was raised on both a farm as well as the city.

Wilson attended Oberlin College, Union Theological Seminary, and Columbia University.

== Career ==
After graduating from Oberlin College in 1890, he began to work as the first secretary for the Student Department of the Y.M.C.A. He graduated with his bachelor's degree in divinity in 1894 from the Union Theological Seminary in New York, New York. Wilson served as a founding pastor of Christ Church in the Quaker Hill community in New York. He also served a pastor in the urban congregation at Arlington Avenue Church in Brooklyn, New York. During his PhD program at Columbia University, he studied under Franklin Giddings. Wilson conducted and submitted his doctoral thesis "Quaker Hill: A Sociological Study", which was a thorough study of the community and considered to be the first sociological study of rural life in America. After receiving his PhD from Columbia University in 1908, he was appointed one of the two superintendents of the Department of Church & Country Life within the Board of Home Missions of the Presbyterian Church. While in this position, he conducted surveys and research on rural churches, promoted rural life conferences, and formed summer school programs for rural pastors across the United States. Many of these writings focused on the problems and needs of rural America and the surveys were considered the first of their kind. The information gathered included information about farming, churches, life styles, and education. He believed that poor economic, social, and educational conditions were related to poor church and community programs.

Wilson, like many Country Life Movement reformers at the time, saw the country church as essential aspect to a more efficient countryside. He believed the country church could influence the intellectual, spiritual, social, and moral lives of the rural community. Many of the community programs he began for rural pastors, including summer sessions and conferences, had topics ranging from efficient farming, fruit raising, being a rural pastor, and rural evangelism. These programs connected modern calls for efficiency with the efforts of the country church.

== Personal life ==
Wilson married Pauline Lane on June 20, 1895, in Quaker Hill, New York. They had four children: Margaret, Julius Lane, John Albert, and Agnes Elizabeth.

== Notable works ==
- Quaker Hill: A Sociological Study (1907)
- The Farmer's Club in the Country Church (1911)
- The Country Church Program (1910)
- The Church of the Open Country; A Study of the Working Farmer (1911)
- The Evolution of the Country Community: A Study in Religious Sociology (1912)
- The Church of the Open Country: A Study of the Church for the Working Farmer (1912)
- The Evolution of the Country Community (1912)
- No Need to be Poor in the Country (1912)
- Community Study by Groups: A Practical Scheme for the Investigation of the Problems of the Large Town Or City Ward from the Point of View of the Church and Its Work (1912)
- The Revival of Interest in the Country Church (1912)
- The Church at the Center (1914)
- At School with the Country Pastor (1914)
- The Second Missionary Adventure (1915)
- Rural Education in War (1917)
- The Farmer's Church (1925)
- Rural Religion and the Country Church (1927)
- To the Mountains (1932)
- The Farmers' Church and the Farmers' College (191?)
