= Aaron S. Lanfare =

Aaron Steven Lanfare
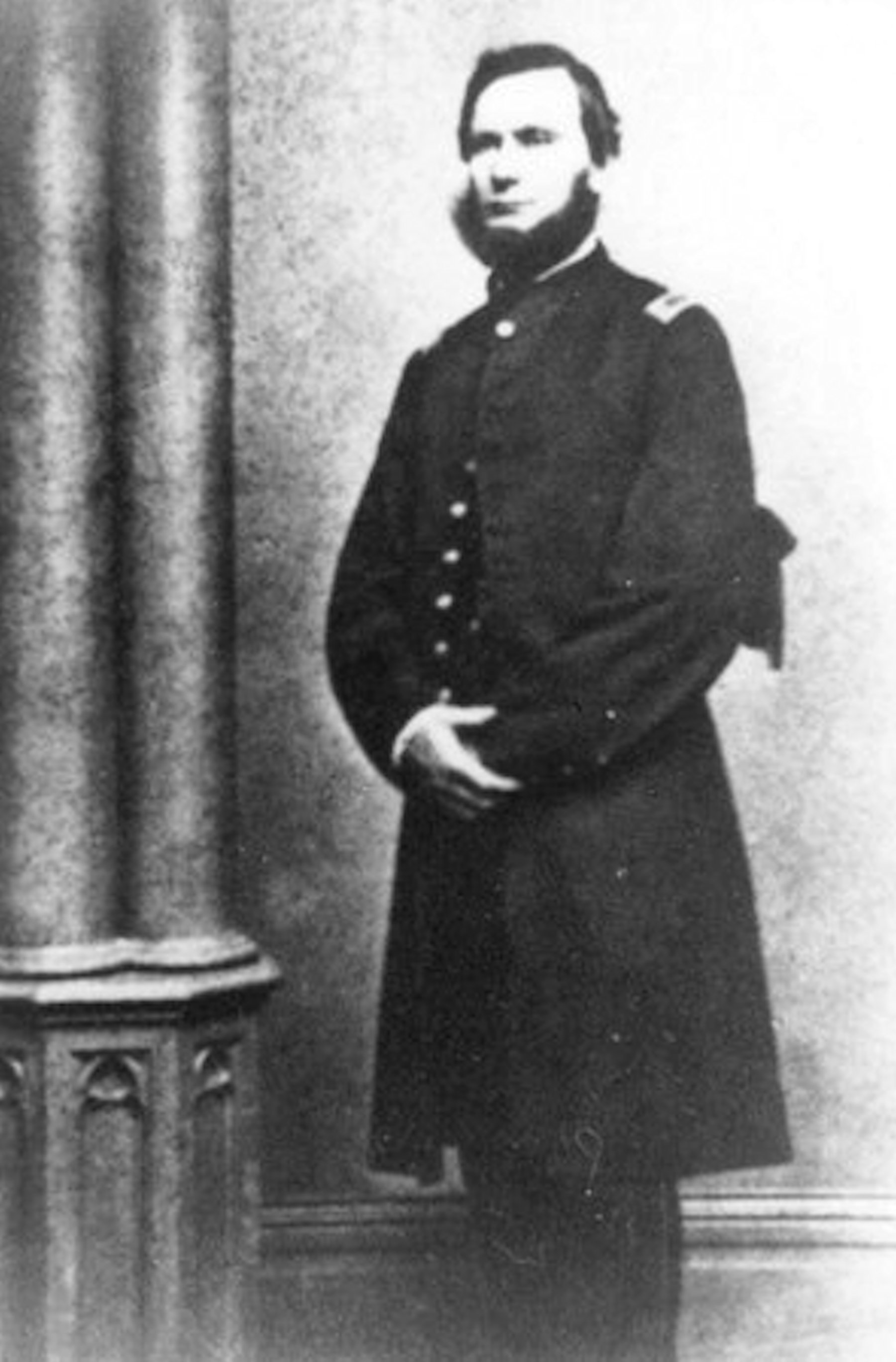
- Born: September 9, 1824; Branford, Connecticut, US
- Died: August 19, 1875 (aged 50); At sea
- Burial place: Branford, Connecticut, US
- Military career
- Allegiance: United States of America; Union
- Branch: United States Army; Union Army
- Service years: 1861 - 1865
- Rank: First Lieutenant
- Units: Company B, 1st Regiment Connecticut Volunteer Cavalry
- Conflicts: American Civil War
- Awards: Medal of Honor

Aaron Steven Lanfare (September 9, 1824 - August 19, 1875) was a first lieutenant in the Union Army and a Medal of Honor recipient for his actions in the American Civil War.

A pre-war merchant sailor, Lanfare enlisted in the 1st Connecticut Cavalry from Branford, Connecticut in November 1861, and was mustered out in August 1865. After his military service he returned to serve in the merchant marine, until his ship was lost in the West Indies.

== Medal of Honor citation ==
Rank and organization: First Lieutenant, Company B, 1st Connecticut Cavalry. Place and date: At Sailors Creek, Va., April 6, 1865. Entered service at: Branford, Conn. Birth: Branford, Conn. Date of issue: May 3, 1865.

Citation:

Capture of flag of 11th Florida Infantry (C.S.A.).

== See also ==
- List of American Civil War Medal of Honor recipients: G–L
