= Pawling Nature Reserve =

Protected area in Pawling, New York

Pawling
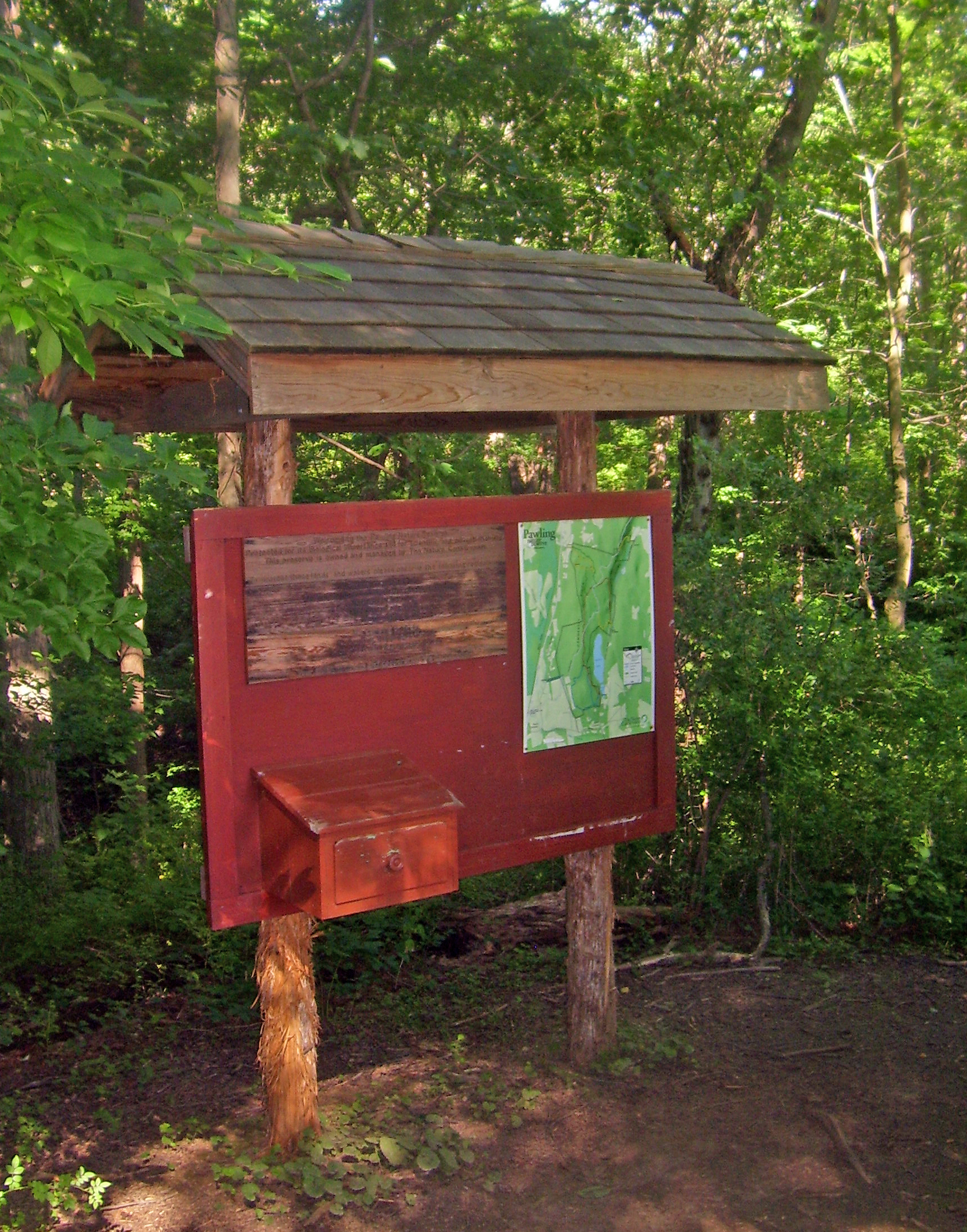
- Informational kiosk along Appalachian Trail at its southern entry into reserve

- Location within New York Location within the United States
- Location: Dutchess, Hudson Valley, New York, United States
- Coordinates: 41°36′10″N 73°33′37″W
- Area: 1.64 sq mi (4.2 km^{2})
- Elevation: 800 ft (240 m)
- Established: 1958
- Operator: The Nature Conservancy
- Website: Pawling Nature Reserve

The Pawling Nature Reserve is located in the northern section of the Town of Pawling, New York, United States. It is a 1,060-acre (430 ha) area located along the top of Hammersby Ridge, near Quaker Lake owned and managed by The Nature Conservancy.

Acquired in 1958 from a local citizens' group, it is preserved to protect several diverse communities, including plant and animal species considered rare or threatened in New York, such as the devil's bit, soapwort gentian, maidenhair spleenwort and some salamander communities. It also helps protect the watershed of the Great Swamp to the east.

More than 10 miles (16 km) of hiking trails cross the preserve, including a section of the Appalachian Trail, which provides access for hikers who take the Metro-North Harlem Line from New York City and get off at the nearby stop along NY 22/55. The preserve's main access is a large parking lot on Quaker Lake Road. In addition to the natural environments, the trails also offer scenic views of the Harlem Valley region.
