= Edward W. Whitaker =

American Civil War Medal of Honor recipient (1841–1922)

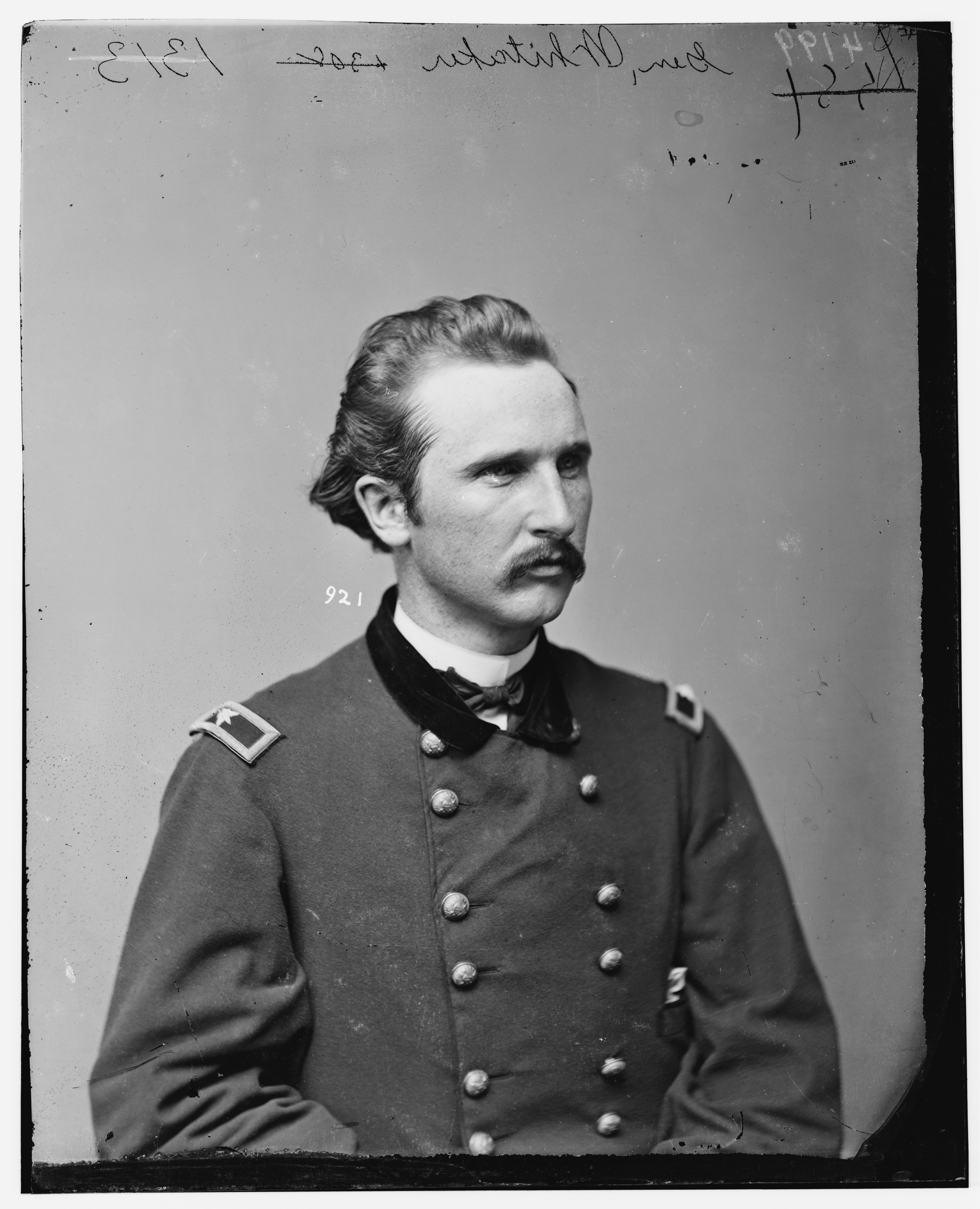
- Born: June 15, 1841; Killingly, Connecticut
- Died: July 30, 1922 (aged 81); Washington, D.C.
- Military career
- Allegiance: Union Army
- Service years: 1861–1865
- Awards: Medal of Honor

Edward Washburn Whitaker (June 15, 1841 – July 30, 1922) was a Union Army officer during the American Civil War. He was awarded the Medal of Honor for gallantry in action in 1864. He was one of the youngest generals in the Union Army, promoted to Brigadier General at the age of 23.

== Biography ==
=== Civil War service ===
Whitaker and three of his brothers enlisted in the Union Army during the Civil War. He originally enlisted as a sergeant in the 2nd New York Cavalry Regiment.

On April 23, 1864 Whitaker was commissioned as captain of Company E of the 1st Connecticut Cavalry Regiment. He earned the Congressional Medal of Honor for his actions at Reams Station, Virginia, on June 29, 1864 by riding through enemy lines to deliver dispatches to Major General George Meade, the commander of the Army of the Potomac. The Medal of Honor was awarded to him on April 2, 1898 – almost 34 years after his action.

In October 1864 Whitaker was promoted to the rank of major and in January 1865 to lieutenant colonel. At Appomattox as chief of staff to General George Armstrong Custer, he bore the flag of truce to the Confederate lines prior to a planned Union attack. Subsequent negotiations resulted in the unconditional surrender which prevented further bloodshed.

In March 1865, at age 23, he was brevetted (i.e. an honorary promotion) as a brigadier general of volunteers for meritorious service during the war and was one of the youngest generals in the Civil War. (Llewellyn Garrish Estes was younger, and Galusha Pennypacker was the youngest, promoted to brigadier general shortly before he turned 21.) Whitaker was honorable mustered out of service on August 2, 1865.

=== Post war ===
General Whitaker joined the District of Columbia Society of the Sons of the American Revolution and was assigned SAR national membership number is 13552 and District of Columbia Society number 702.

He was also a First Class Companion of the District of Columbia Commandery of the Military Order of the Loyal Legion of the United States - a military society composed of officers of the Union armed forces and their descendants.

General Edward W. Whitaker died at his home in Washington, D.C. at the age of eighty-one on July 30, 1922. He is buried in Arlington National Cemetery.

== Medal of Honor citation ==
While acting as an aide voluntarily carried dispatches from the commanding general to Gen. Meade, forcing his way with a single troop of Cavalry, through an Infantry division of the enemy in the most distinguished manner, though he lost half his escort in the desperate ride at Reams Station, Virginia on 29 June 1864.

== Dates of rank ==
- Sergeant, Company D, 2nd New York Cavalry - August 21, 1861
- Captain, 1st Connecticut Cavalry - April 23, 1864
- Major, 1st Connecticut Cavalry - October 1, 1864
- Lieutenant Colonel, 1st Connecticut Cavalry - January 17, 1865
- Brevet Brigadier General, U.S. Volunteers - March 13, 1865

== See also ==
- List of American Civil War brevet generals (Union)
