= 1st Connecticut Cavalry Regiment =

- Active: November 2, 1861, to August 2, 1865
- Country: United States
- Allegiance: Union
- Branch: Cavalry
- Engagements: Battle of Cross Keys; Second Battle of Bull Run; Overland Campaign; Battle of Spotsylvania Court House; Battle of Cold Harbor; Siege of Petersburg; Valley Campaigns of 1864; Battle of Strasburg; Battle of Opequon; Battle of Cedar Creek; Appomattox Campaign; Battle of Five Forks; Battle of Sailor's Creek

The 1st Connecticut Cavalry Regiment was a cavalry regiment that served in the Union Army during the American Civil War.

== Service ==
The 1st Connecticut Cavalry Regiment was organized at West Meriden, Connecticut, on November 2, 1861, initially as the 1st Battalion Connecticut Cavalry under the command of Major Judson M. Lyon.

The regiment was attached to Railroad District, Mountain Department, to April 1862. Schenck's Brigade, Mountain Department, to June 1862. Cavalry Brigade, I Corps, Army of Virginia, to September 1862. Cavalry Brigade, XI Corps, Army of the Potomac, to January 1863. Defenses of Baltimore, Maryland, VIII Corps, Middle Department, to July 1863. Maryland Heights Division, Department of West Virginia, to October 1863. Cavalry Brigade, 1st Division, Department of Western Virginia to January 1864. Cavalry Reserve, VIII Corps, defenses of Baltimore to March 1864. 1st Brigade, 3rd Division, Cavalry Corps, Army of the Potomac and Army of the Shenandoah, Middle Military Division, to June 1865. Cavalry Division, XXII Corps Department of Washington to August 1865.

The 1st Connecticut Cavalry mustered out of service on August 2, 1865.

== Detailed service ==
Moved to Wheeling, Virginia, February 20–24, 1862, and duty there until March 27. Operations against guerrillas in Hardy County, Virginia, until May 1862. Action at Moorefield, Virginia, April 3. March to relief of Milroy May 2–7. McDowell May 8. Franklin May 10–12. Strasburg May 24. Wosdensville May 28. Raid to Shaver River May 30. Strasburg June 1. New Market June 5. Harrisonburg June 7. Cross Keys June 8. Port Republic June 9. Movement down the valley to Madison Court House June 10-July 28. Scout from Strasburg June 22–30 (Company B). Scouting in vicinity of Madison Court House until August. Pope's campaign in northern Virginia Aug. 16-Sept. 2. Provost duty during the Bull Run battles Aug. 27–30. Duty at Tennallytown, Fairfax Court House, Kalorama Heights, and Hall's Farm until December. March to Fredericksburg, Virginia, and duty at Stafford Court House until January 1863. Kelly's Ford December 20–22, 1862. Moved to Baltimore, Maryland, and duty there, organizing as a regiment until March 1864 (Companies A, B, C, D, and E). Moved to Harpers Ferry, West Virginia, July 5, 1863, and duty in that vicinity until January 1864. Skirmish at Waterford Aug. 8, 1863 (detachment). Berryville October 18. Expedition from Charlestown to New Market November 15–18. Operations in Hampshire and Hardy Counties, West Virginia, January 27-February 7, 1864. Moorefield, February 4, 1864 (detachment). Regimental organization completed at Baltimore January 1864, and duty there until March. Moved to Annapolis Junction March 8, then to Brandy Station, Virginia, March 15. Joined brigade March 15. Rappahannock April 1. Rapidan Campaign May–June. Craig's Meeting House May 5. Todd's Tavern May 5–6. Alsop's farm, Spotsylvania, May 8. Sheridan's raid to James River May 9–24. North Anna River May 9–10. Ground Squirrel Bridge and Yellow Tavern May 11. Brook Church or fortifications of Richmond May 12. Strawberry Hill May 12. Demonstration on Little River May 26. Line of the Totopotomoy May 28–31. Mechump's Creek and Hanover Court House May 31. Ashland June 1. Totopotomoy and Gaines' Mills June 2. Haw's Shop June 3. Cold Harbor June 3–12. Bethesda Church June 11. Long Bridge June 12. St. Mary's Church June 15. Cold Harbor June 18. Wilson's raid on south side and Danville Railroad June 20–30. Black and White Station and Nottaway Court House June 23. Staunton Bridge or Roanoke Station June 25. Sappony Church or Stony Creek June 28–29. Ream's Station June 29. Siege of Petersburg until August. Sheridan's Shenandoah Valley Campaign August to December. Winchester August 17. Abraham's Creek September 13. Battle of Opequon, Winchester, September 19. Near Cedarville September 20. Front Royal Pike September 21. Milford September 22. Tom's Brook, "Woodstock Races", October 8–9. Battle of Cedar Creek October 10. Cedar Creek October 13. Cedar Run Church October 17. Newtown, Cedar Creek, November 12. Rude's Hill, near Mt. Jackson, November 22. Raid to Lacy Springs December 19–22. Lacy Springs December 21. Expedition from Winchester to Moorefield, West Virginia, February 4–6, 1865. Sheridan's Raid February 27-March 25. Occupation of Staunton March 2. Waynesboro March 2. Charlottesville March 3. Ashland March 15. Appomattox Campaign March 28-April 9. Dinwiddie Court House March 30–31. Five Forks April 1. Fall of Petersburg April 2. Namozine Church April 3. Sailor's Creek April 6. Appomattox Station April 8. Appomattox Court House, April 9. Surrender of Lee and his army. Expedition to Danville April 23–29. Moved to Washington, D.C., May. Grand Review of the Armies May 23. Provost duty at Washington until August.

== Casualties ==
The regiment lost a total of 193 men during service; 4 officers and 36 enlisted men killed or mortally wounded, 4 officers and 149 enlisted men died of disease.

== Commanders ==
- Colonel Erastus Blakeslee - commanded the battalion at the Battle of Cross Keys while still commissioned as a captain
- Colonel Brayton Ives
- Major Judson M. Lyon - original commander of the battalion
- Major George O. Marcy - commanded at the Battle of Opequon
- Captain Edwin W. French - commanded at the Battle of Cedar Creek
- Captain Lewis N. Middlebrook - promoted from Company B to command the battalion upon the resignation of Major Lyon
- Captain Uriah N. Parmelee - commanded at the Battle of Five Forks

== Notable members ==
- 1st Lieutenant Aaron S. Lanfare, Company B - Medal of Honor recipient for action at the Battle of Sailor's Creek
- Private Charles H. Marsh, Company D - Medal of Honor recipient for action during a skirmish in the Valley Campaign of 1864 near Back Creek, July 31, 1864
- Captain Edward W. Whitaker, Company E - Medal of Honor recipient for action at the First Battle of Ream's Station; later promoted to brevet brigadier general

== See also ==
- Connecticut in the American Civil War
- List of Connecticut Civil War units
