= Charlotte Brooks =

American photographer and photojournalist

- Born: Charlotte Finkelstein; September 16, 1918; Brooklyn, New York, U.S.
- Died: March 15, 2014 (aged 95); Holmes, New York, U.S.
- Known for: Photography
- Partner: Julie Arden

Charlotte Finkelstein Brooks (September 16, 1918 – March 15, 2014) was an American photographer and photojournalist. From 1951 to 1971, she was a staff photographer for Look and the only woman staff photographer in the magazine's history.

== Early life and education ==
Brooks née Finkelstein was born on September 16, 1918, in Brooklyn.

She studied psychology at Brooklyn College and at the University of Minnesota. After a short period in Bernice Abbott's photography class at the New School for Social Research, she studied dance at the school with Barbara Mettler. In 1942, Brooks began to assist Barbara Morgan in her studio in Scarsdale, New York, quickly adopting photography as her vocation.

== Career ==
Inspired by Dorothea Lange, she began to produce informative social reform photographs. In 1943, she worked as an assistant to Gjon Mili, doing advertising photography for Life and Vogue. In 1945, she worked freelance with Standard Oil of New Jersey, illustrating the story of oil in home life and in fighting the war.

In 1951, she began her career at Look as one of the first women they ever hired as a full-time staff photographer. She began first working on advertising assignments and what were thought of at the time as women's features (e.g. family, children, domestic affairs). Brooks gradually took on news stories, beginning with the candidacy of Dwight D. Eisenhower for president in 1952. Other assignments included medical stories, education, and the coverage of various American cities. She also traveled with and photographed many celebrities, including Duke Ellington, Marilyn Monroe and Lucille Ball. Ed Sullivan introduced her from his audience as "the best girl photographer." From 1951 to their last issue in 1971, Brooks continued to work at Look and published over 450 features until the magazine ceased publication in 1971. The Charlotte Brooks archive is located at the Library of Congress.

== Personal life ==
After Look, Brooks and her longterm partner, Julie Arden, moved to Dutchess County in upstate New York, where they opened the White Pond Art Center.

== Death ==
Brooks died on March 15, 2014, in Holmes, New York. Charlotte was predeceased by her partner of 62 years, Julie Arden, in 2003. Her death was announced in The New York Times and featured a thorough biography of her life and career.
