= 33rd New Jersey Infantry Regiment =

- Active: September 3, 1863 – July 17, 1865
- Country: United States
- Allegiance: Union
- Branch: Infantry
- Engagements: Battle of Missionary Ridge; Atlanta campaign Battle of Resaca; Battle of Dallas; Battle of New Hope Church; Battle of Allatoona; Battle of Marietta; Battle of Kennesaw Mountain; Battle of Peachtree Creek; Siege of Atlanta; Sherman's March to the Sea; Carolinas campaign Battle of Bentonville

The 33rd New Jersey Infantry Regiment was an infantry regiment in the Union Army during the American Civil War.

== Service ==
The 33rd New Jersey Infantry Regiment was organized at Newark, New Jersey for three years service and mustered in September 3, 1863 under the command of Colonel George W. Mindil.

The regiment was attached to 1st Brigade, 2nd Division, XI Corps, Army of the Potomac, to October 1863, and Army of the Cumberland to April 1864. 2nd Brigade, 2nd Division, XX Corps, Army of the Cumberland and Army of Georgia, to July 1865.

The 33rd New Jersey Infantry mustered out of service July 17, 1865, at Washington, D.C.

== Detailed service ==
Left New Jersey for Washington, D.C., September 8, 1863, then moved to Warrenton, Va., September 13–19. Movement to Bridgeport, Ala., September 26–30, 1863, then moved to mouth of Battle Creek, October 18, and duty there guarding bridges until November 4. Moved to Lookout Valley, Tenn., November 4–6. Chattanooga-Ringgold Campaign November 23–27. Orchard Knob November 23. Tunnel Hill November 24–25. Missionary Ridge November 25. March to relief of Knoxville November 28 – December 17. Duty in Alabama until May 1864. Atlanta Campaign May 1 – September 8. Demonstration on Rocky Faced Ridge May 8–11. Dug Gap or Mill Creek May 8. Battle of Resaca May 14–15. Near Cassville May 19. Advance on Dallas May 22–25. New Hope Church May 25. Battles about Dallas, New Hope Church, and Allatoona Hills May 26 – June 5. Operations about Marietta and against Kennesaw Mountain June 10 – July 2. Pine Hill June 11–14. Lost Mountain June 15–17. Gilgal or Golgotha Church June 15. Muddy Creek June 17. Noyes Creek June 19. Kolb's Farm June 22. Assault on Kennesaw June 27. Ruff's Station, Smyrna Camp Ground, July 4. Chattahoochie River July 5–17. Peachtree Creek July 19–20. Siege of Atlanta July 22 – August 25. Operations at Chattahoochie River Bridge August 26 – September 2. Occupation of Atlanta September 2 – November 15. Expedition to Tuckum's Cross Roads October 26–29. Near Atlanta November 9. March to the sea November 15 – December 10. Montieth Swamp December 9. Siege of Savannah December 10–21. Carolinas Campaign January to April 1865. Averysboro, N.C., March 16. Battle of Bentonville March 19–21. Occupation of Goldsboro March 24. Advance on Raleigh April 10–14. Smithfield, N.C., April 11. Occupation of Raleigh April 14. Bennett's House April 26. Surrender of Johnston and his army. March to Washington, D.C., via Richmond, Va., April 29 – May 19. Grand Review of the Armies May 23–24.

== Casualties ==
The regiment lost a total of 163 men during service; 6 officers and 72 enlisted men killed or mortally wounded, 85 enlisted men died of disease.

== Commanders ==
- Colonel George W. Mindil

== Notable members ==
- 1st Lieutenant John J. Toffey, Company F – Medal of Honor recipient for action at the Battle of Missionary Ridge

== See also ==
- List of New Jersey Civil War units
- New Jersey in the American Civil War
