= John J. Toffey =

United States Union Army officer

John James Toffey
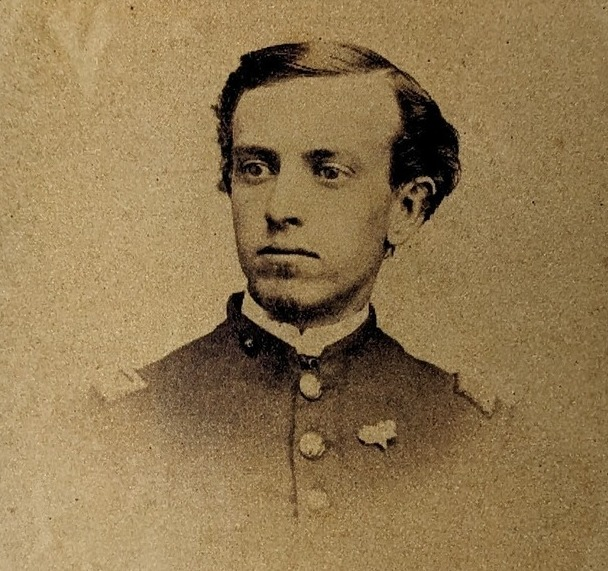
- John James Toffey, Medal of Honor recipient
- Born: June 1, 1844; Pawling, New York, US
- Died: March 13, 1911 (aged 66); Pawling, New York, US
- Burial place: Pawling Cemetery
- Military career
- Allegiance: United States; Union
- Branch: United States Army; Union Army
- Service years: 1862–1866
- Rank: First Lieutenant
- Units: Company F, 33rd New Jersey Volunteer Infantry
- Conflicts: American Civil War; *Battle of Missionary Ridge
- Awards: Medal of Honor
- Other work: County Sheriff, New Jersey State Treasurer

John James Toffey (June 1, 1844 – March 13, 1911) was a United States Union Army officer during the American Civil War who received the Medal of Honor.

== Civil War ==
Serving first as a Private in Company C, 21st New Jersey Volunteer Infantry (a nine-month service regiment) from August 28, 1862 to June 19, 1863, he was commissioned as a First Lieutenant in Company F, 33rd New Jersey Volunteer Infantry on August 23, 1863, and was mustered into the unit on August 29, 1863. He participated in the November 23, 1863 Battle of Missionary Ridge, at Chattanooga, Tennessee, and it was there that he performed the act of bravery that garnered him the Medal of Honor.

His wounds forced his discharge from the 33rd New Jersey on June 2, 1864, and he was appointed into the Veteran Reserve Corps. He served in the VRC as a lieutenant until June 1866. While still in service, he was an eyewitness to Lincoln's assassination at Ford's Theater, participated in the search for the conspirators, testified at their trial, and witnessed their subsequent execution.

After the war, he became a Companion of the New York Commandery of the Military Order of the Loyal Legion of the United States.

He received his medal on September 10, 1897.

== Post-War career ==
After the war he went on to have a life of extensive public service in Hudson County, New Jersey. He served two terms as Hudson County sheriff, served as state treasurer of New Jersey from 1875 to 1891, as an alderman of Jersey City, New Jersey, and was elected as a member of the New Jersey State Legislature.

He died in Pawling, New York, the town of his birth, and was buried in the Pawling Cemetery, near the grave of Civil War Naval hero Rear Admiral John Lorimer Worden, his uncle by marriage of Worden to his father's sister Olive. His grave was marked with a Medal of Honor headstone in 2004, 93 years after his death.

== Medal of Honor citation ==
Rank and organization: First Lieutenant, Company G, 33d New Jersey Infantry. Place and date. At Chattanooga, Tenn., November 23, 1863. Entered service at: Hudson, N.J. Birth: Duchess, N.Y. Date of issue: September 10, 1897.

Citation:

Although excused from duty on account of sickness, went to the front in command of a storming party and with conspicuous gallantry participated in the assault of Missionary Ridge; was here wounded and permanently disabled.

== See also ==
- List of American Civil War Medal of Honor recipients: T–Z

== Notes ==
Political offices
| Preceded by Gershom Mott | Treasurer of New Jersey; 1875–1891 | Succeeded by George B. Swain |
