= Charles H. Marsh =

Union Army Medal of Honor recipient

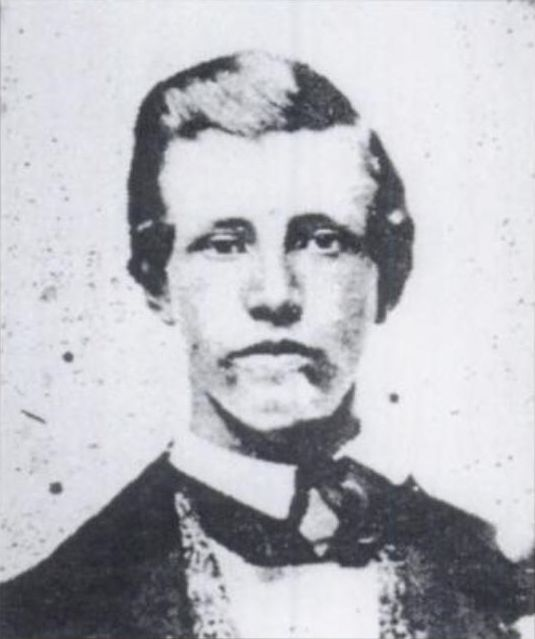
- Charles H. Marsh
- Born: c. 1840; Milford, Connecticut, US
- Died: January 25, 1867 (aged 26–27); Pawling, New York, US
- Military career
- Allegiance: United States
- Branch: United States Army
- Service years: 1861 - 1865
- Rank: Corporal
- Units: Company D, 1st Connecticut
- Conflicts: American Civil War • Valley Campaigns of 1864 • Battle of Spotsylvania Court House
- Awards: Medal of Honor

Charles H. Marsh (c. 1840 – January 25, 1867) was a Union Army soldier in the American Civil War and a recipient of the United States military's highest decoration, the Medal of Honor, for his actions during a skirmish in the Valley Campaigns of 1864.

== Life and military ==
Born in Milford, Connecticut, Marsh was raised in the Lanesville district of New Milford. He enlisted in the Army from New Milford on October 21, 1861, and served as a private in Company D, 1st Connecticut Cavalry.

In October 1862, one year after his enlistment, Marsh was captured by Confederates near Haymarket, Virginia. He was found with a letter which indicated to the Confederates that he may be a spy, and he was jailed at Castle Thunder, a facility in Richmond for civilian prisoners and Union agents. Marsh protested to Confederate Secretary of War James Seddon, arguing that the area where he was captured was Union-held, and he should thus be considered a prisoner of war rather than a spy. His argument was rejected, but he was nevertheless released in a prisoner exchange in December of that year.

Marsh rejoined the 1st Connecticut Cavalry and participated in the Valley Campaigns of 1864. On July 31, 1864, in the Back Creek valley of western Virginia, his unit conducted a raid on Confederate General Jubal Early's troops. During the skirmish, Marsh captured a color bearer and his flag. For these actions, he was awarded the Medal of Honor six months later, on January 23, 1865. His official citation reads "Capture of flag and its bearer."

Marsh took part in the Battle of Spotsylvania Court House of May 1864 and reached the rank of corporal before leaving the military in August 1865. He moved to Pawling, New York, where he died at age 27 of tuberculosis, which he had contracted in the Army.

Marsh Bridge, spanning the Housatonic River in New Milford, is named in his honor. He is one of only two Milford residents to have received the Medal of Honor, the other being Indian Wars officer George W. Baird.

== See also ==
- List of Medal of Honor recipients
- List of American Civil War Medal of Honor recipients: M–P
