= Holmes, New York =

Hamlet in Pawling, New York, United States

- Hamlet
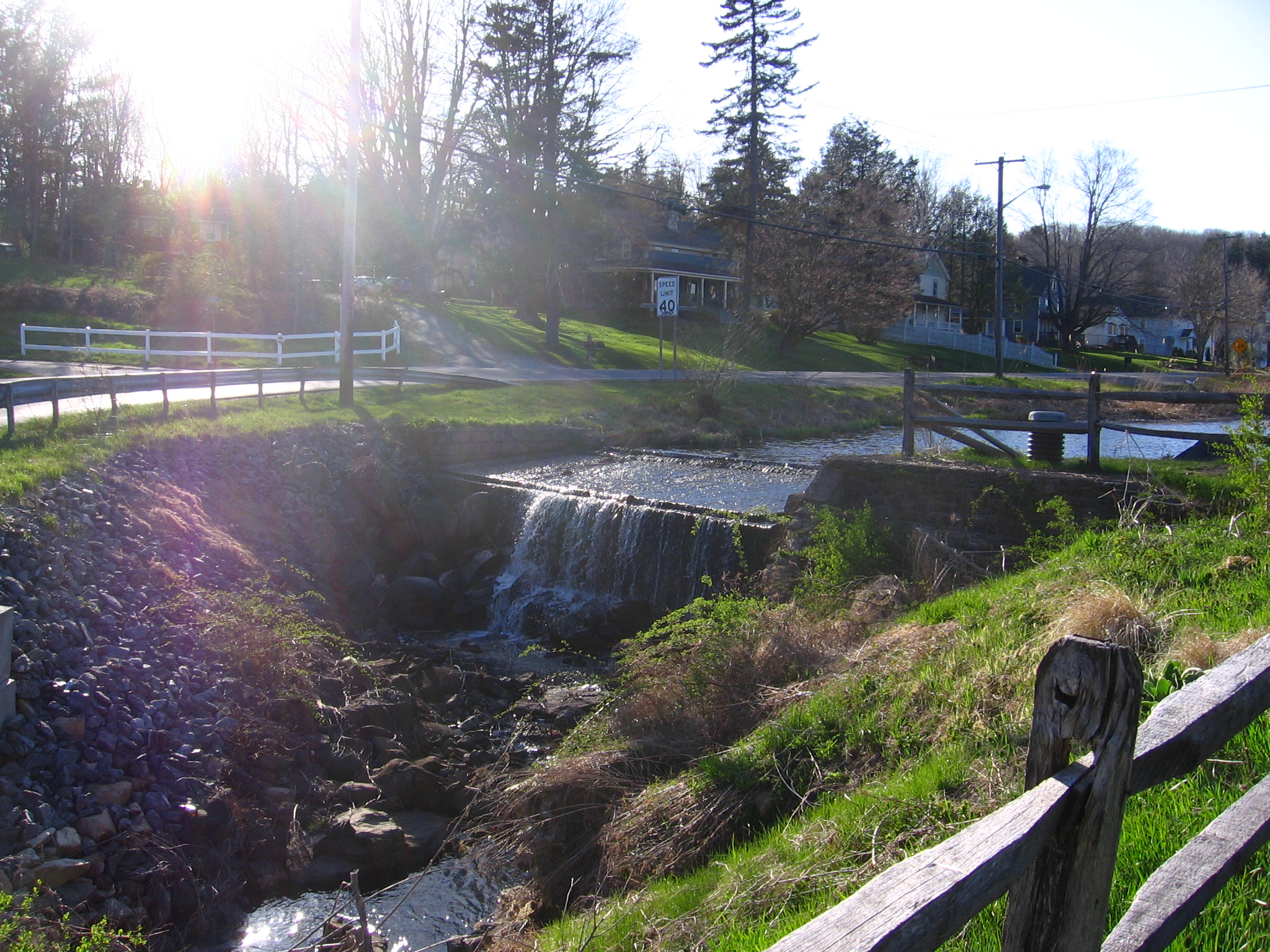

- Location in New York Location in the United States
- Coordinates: 41°31′24.34″N 73°38′48.46″W
- Country: United States
- U.S. state: New York
- County: Dutchess
- Town: Pawling
- ZIP Code: 12531

Holmes is a hamlet in the town of Pawling, Dutchess County, New York, United States.

== History ==
Formerly Reynoldsville, the decision was made to change the name upon the discovery that there was already a post office with the same name in New York. The post office, railroad station, and subsequently the community they served was renamed to Holmes in 1898 after the Holmes family, who were prominent property owners of the area.

=== Historic Photos ===
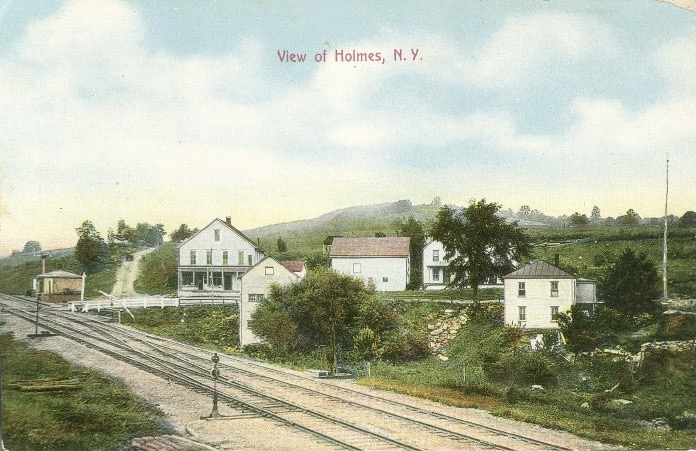

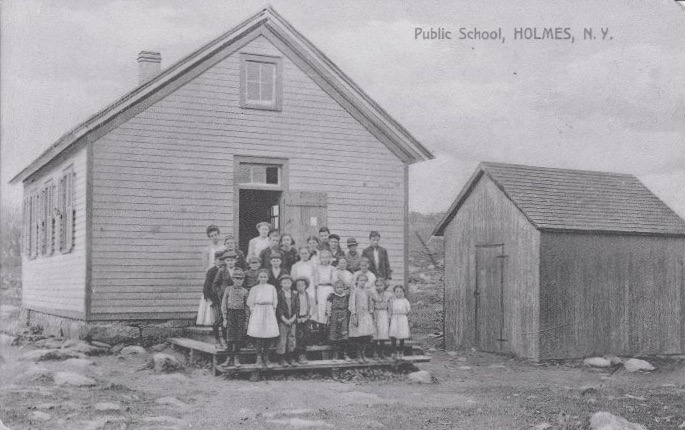

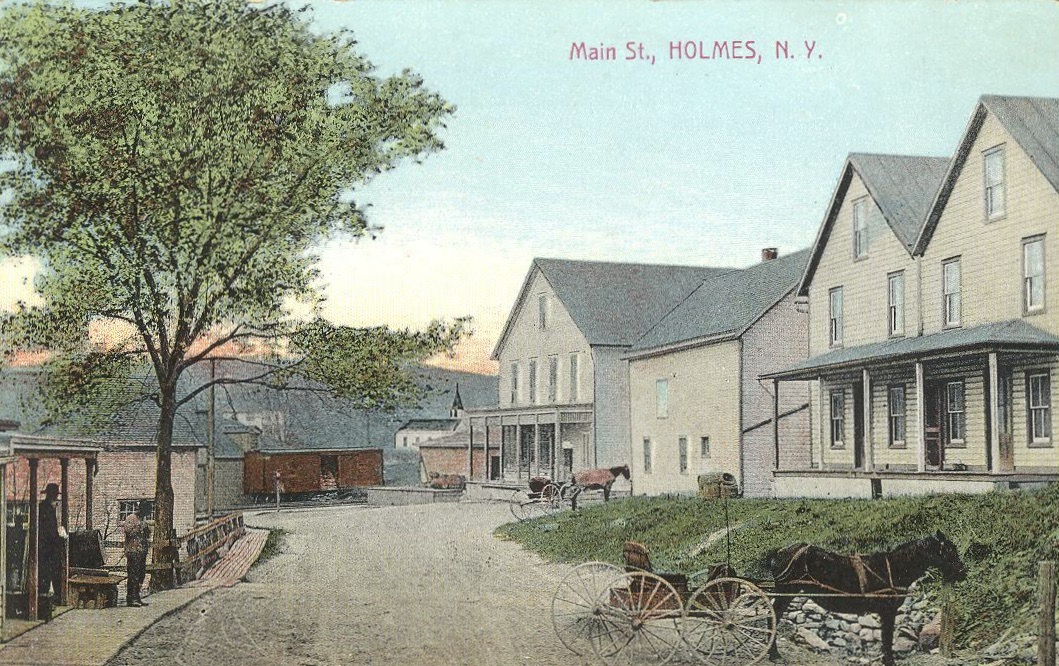

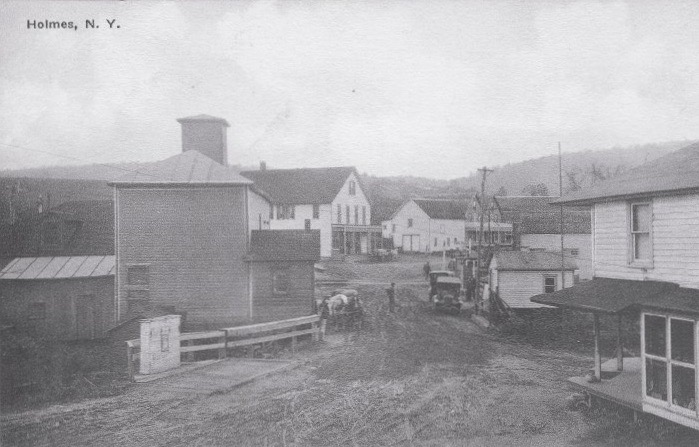

=== Notable Places ===
Whaley Lake Church
The oldest Baptist Church in the state of New York is located in Holmes. It was established in 1754 as the "First Pawling Baptist Church."
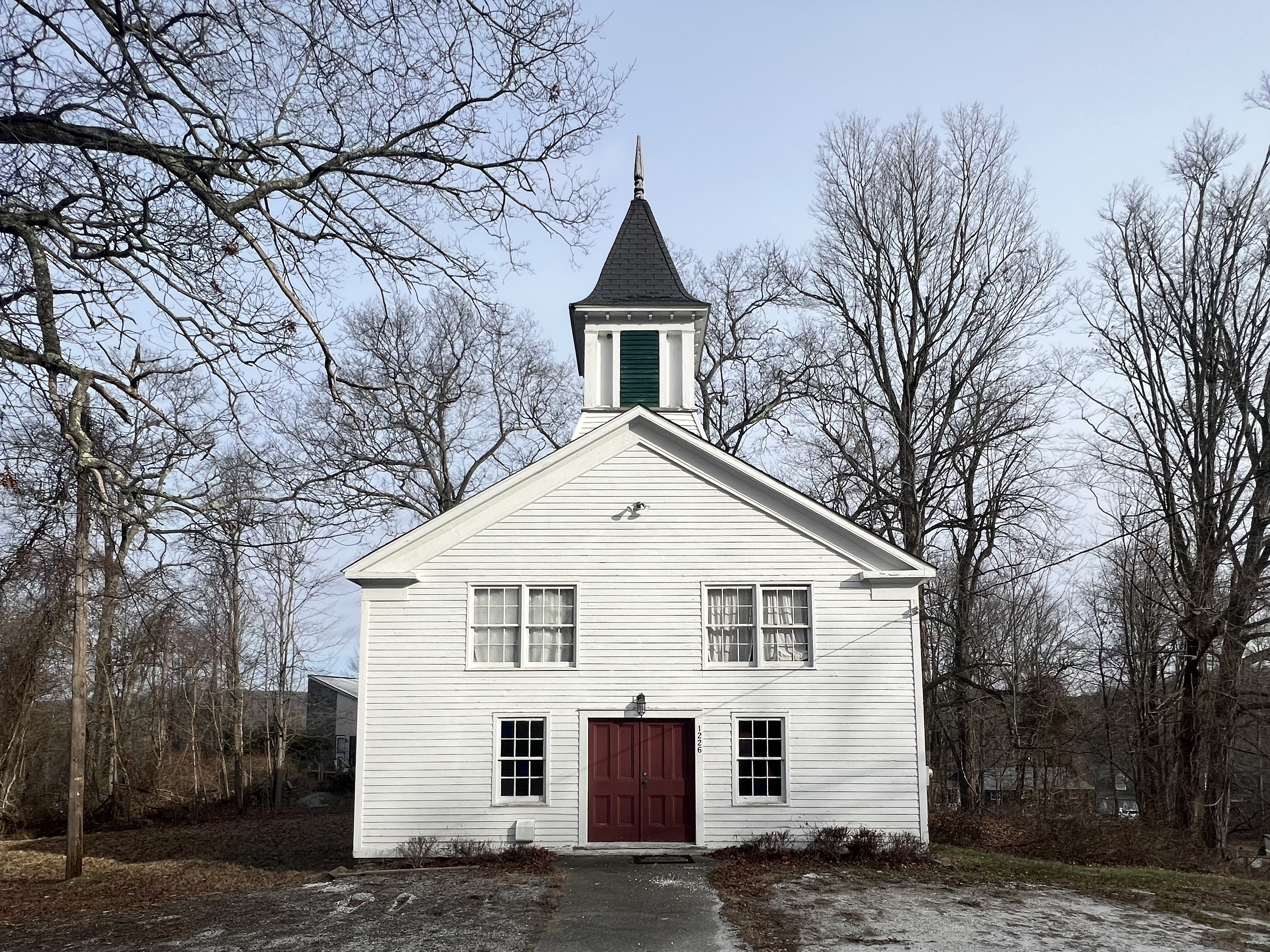

Holmes Station
The former station was once a stop on the Maybrook Line, which allowed passenger travel to Poughkeepsie, Brewster, and Danbury. However, for most of the 1900s the station was used for transporting goods rather than people.
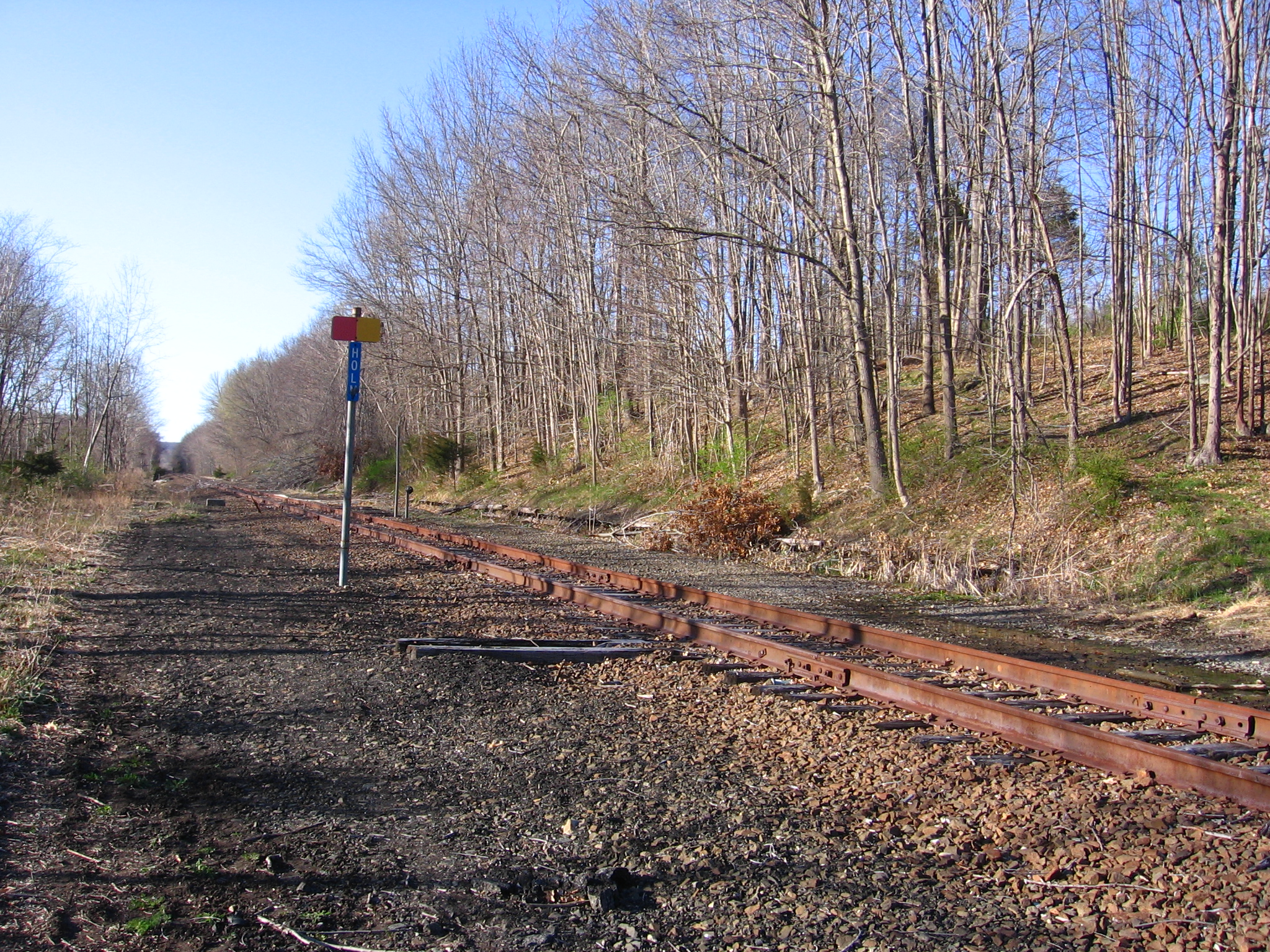

Sanita Hills A former vacation camp for NYC sanitation workers, notable for the use of "Pullmanettes," or decommissioned railway cars, which were converted into bungalows for the campers. The camp sparked controversy over the LaGuardia administration's misuse of city labor and materials at the site. Following a federal investigation, the camp was shut down and donated to the Boy Scouts of America in 1956.

== Parks and recreation ==
- Wonder Lake State Park
- Crystal Park
- Depot Hill Multiple Use Area
- Camp Kaufmann

== Notable people ==
- Charlotte Brooks - American photographer and photojournalist
- Kathy Mulholland - U.S. Olympic speed skater
- Paul-Henri Nargeolet - French deep-sea diver, Titanic expert, and Titan pilot
