= Akin Free Library =

- U.S. National Register of Historic Places
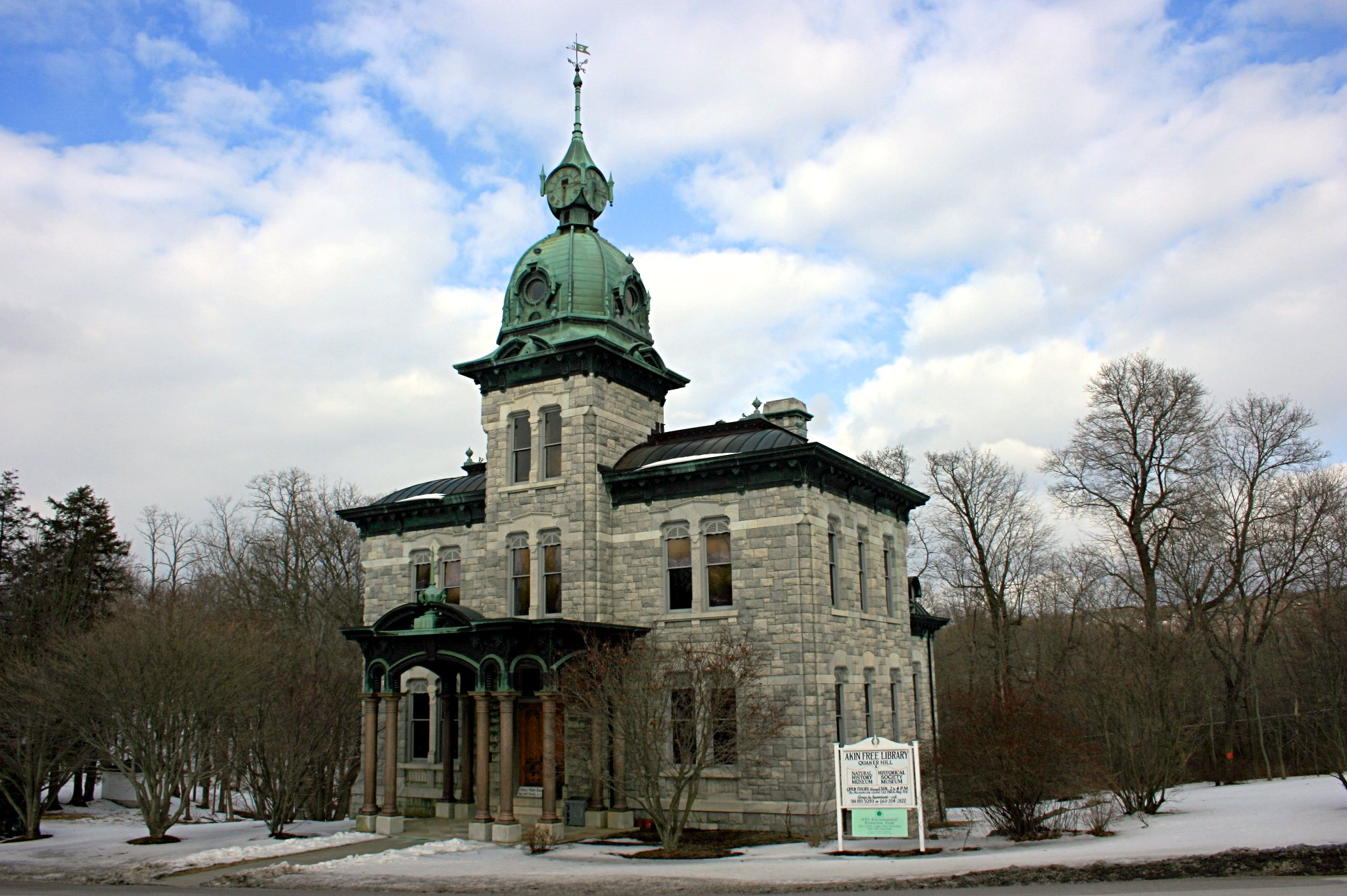
- Library building in March 2007

- Location within New York Location within the United States
- Location: 378 Old Quaker Hill Rd., Pawling, New York 12564
- Coordinates: 41°33′32″N 73°32′57″W
- Area: 1.7 acres (0.69 ha)
- Built: 1908
- Architect: John A. Wood
- Architectural style: Late Victorian
- NRHP reference No.: 91001726
- Added to NRHP: November 21, 1991

The Akin Free Library on Quaker Hill is a historic eclectic late Victorian stone building in the hamlet of Quaker Hill, town of Pawling, Dutchess County, New York, USA, listed in the National Register of Historic Places as a historic place of local significance since 1991.

The Akin Free Library was a gift from the Quaker Albert J. Akin (1803–1903), founder of the Bank of Pawling and the Mizzentop Hotel on Quaker Hill. The building was designed by the architect John A. Wood and constructed between 1898 and 1908. It is a 2½-story, T-plan, stone building on a raised basement with an engaged three-story central clock tower and rear annex. The building features an entrance portico, bracketed sheet copper cornice, and standing seam copper roof. Its design is Victorian eclectic.

It was added to the National Register of Historic Places in 1991.

The library itself is located on the first floor of the building. Among others, its holdings of several thousand books contain books of local interest and by local authors, a children's section, and newspaper collections.

== Museums ==
The Historical Society Museum occupies the second floor of the building. Its collections include objects pertaining to the local history such as period and Quaker clothing, tools and artwork, bowling pins from the Mizzentop Hotel, and the service window from the old Quaker Hill Post Office.

The lower floor of the building houses the Olive Gunnison Natural History Museum, which displays about 200 mounted birds, rocks and minerals, as well as a shrunken human head.
