= Jean Tabaud =

French-American painter

- Jean Tabaud at 42
- Born: Jean Gilbert Tabaud; 5 July 1914; Saujon, France
- Died: 3 December 1996 (aged 82); Pawling, New York, United States

Jean Tabaud (5 July 1914 – 3 December 1996) was a French portrait painter and war artist.

== Early life ==
He was born Jean Gilbert Tabaud on July 5, 1914, in the small town of Saujon, France, on the Southwest Atlantic coast, north of Bordeaux. He was the son of Lucien Tabaud and Ernestine Tabaud Hillairet. His father was a butcher by profession, who served in World War I, where he was wounded and gassed during the conflict.

== World War II ==
A first career in classical dance with the Ballets Russes, dancing in Paris, Berlin, Geneva, Belgium, Switzerland, Rio de Janeiro, Tangier, Casablanca, and Argentina was interrupted by a spine injury which forced him to give up dancing altogether. He returned to France to seek treatment for his back but instead met up with the outbreak of World War II. He was immediately drafted into the French Army, witnessed the fall of France to Germany, and was taken prisoner in 1941.

== Painter beginnings ==
His second career as an artist started while he was a prisoner during World War II. While there, he passed the time sketching portraits of his fellow prisoners, and was shortly asked to do the same by guards, as well as the Commandant of the camp. His escape from prison led him back to Paris where he made his living as a peripatetic artist, in the evenings going from one café to another, drawing portraits of German soldiers, sailors, airmen of all ranks, charging but a few francs each. He plied his trade not only in Paris but traveled to the Normandy coast and Le Havre – often on bicycle. All the portraits he executed during this time had to be signed with the name Juvee. By the time of Germany's defeat, Tabaud had executed over 5,000 portraits between 1942 and 1944.

Following the end of the war, almost one year later, Tabaud, seeking the sun and escape from war-torn Europe, traveled to Mallorca and then to Morocco, where he lived for eight years. In Tangier and Casablanca he established a school of dance, gave recitals, choreographed ballets, wrote articles on art and the dance. During this period he painted many Moroccan landscapes, as well as studies of the local people.

== Move to the US ==
In 1953 he was encouraged to try his luck in the United States. He began in Hollywood, where he was immediately successful, receiving commissions for portraits from such stars as Charles Boyer, Deborah Kerr, Pier Angeli, Zizi Jeanmaire, to name a few. The French Ambassador to Mexico, while visiting Hollywood, suggested an exhibit of his works - particularly his Moroccan landscapes - in Mexico City. It was met with considerable success and was followed by two more exhibits. One in Monterrey and one in Acapulco.

Following several more critically acclaimed exhibits in Los Angeles and San Francisco, Tabaud moved to New York City in 1957, where he established his studio at 440 East 79th Street. Over the next ten years he traveled extensively, executing portrait commissions in the United States and Europe of the rich and famous, as well as the not so rich nor famous. Among his innumerable clients were such subjects as the Mrs. Henry Fords, (both Anne and Christina) as well as his children, Anne, Charlotte, and Edsel. Mrs. Ted Kennedy, Mrs. Stavros Niarchos (Eugénie) and her children. Mrs. Pierre S. DuPont, Jr., Henry Miller, Lady Sarah Russell, Lady Sarah Crichton Stuart, Mrs. T. Jefferson Coolidge, Mrs. Clint Murchison, Jr., and her daughter. Suzy Parker, Peter and Lili Pulitzer and their children, Mrs. John Warner (daughter of Paul Melon) and their children. John Kenneth Galbraith, Baroness Fiona von Thyssen, Mrs. Howard Cushing, Jr., and her children.

In addition to portrait painting, Tabaud experimented with various schools of art, most notably cubism, and with several different techniques, such as oil on canvas as well as on board, colored pen, watercolors, pastels, charcoal and pencil, melted crayon with scratched pen technique, etc. He was strongly influenced by the artists of the impressionist era, especially Renoir, Monet, Corot, Van Gogh, and later Modigliani. The influence of Gauguin can be detected in his Moroccan paintings.

At the height of his career, Tabaud executed several paintings under the name of Leret, but was unsuccessful at marketing them. What sold was a Tabaud. What clients wanted was a Tabaud and nothing less. For several years he was featured in Portraits, Inc., in New York in their annual exhibits of portraits by well-known artists. His work appeared regularly in their The New Yorker and other magazine ads, as well in their New Year's greetings to their clients, featuring the portraits he did of the founders of Portraits, Inc., - Lois Shaw and Helen Appleton Read. These cards sometimes included the portrait he did of Andrea Erickson Gehringer as well.

It was only in 1980 that he gave up his studio in New York altogether and settled permanently in Pawling, traveling but once a year to France to visit old friends. He had no family. He never had any children.

Tabaud also excelled in painting children. Though he never had any of his own, he enjoyed painting them. After seeing one of Tabaud's exhibits in 1956, the art critic of the Los Angeles Herald Examiner said: "He gives their faces marvelous expressions: as if they are, in a spiritual sense, on the threshold of adult experiences, as if some unknown force is pulling their thoughts into a world they would much rather back off from."

In Pawling, Tabaud pleased friends and neighbors by drawing their portraits, free of charge. Whole days and evenings were spent reading the works of philosophers whose thoughts he had long wished to examine but had never had the time to do so before.

== Later in life ==
Jean spent the last five years of his life battling Lyme disease. But this debilitating disease was not diagnosed until three years before his death, when treatment by antibiotics was of little use. In addition, Jean Tabaud was afflicted with cancer of the prostate, loss of hearing, and failing eyesight. He died from a self-inflicted gunshot wound to his head on December 3, 1996. Two years after his death the Village of Pawling changed the name of the winding dirt road leading to his home from Gristmill Lane to Frenchman's Lane. His final portraits, three drawings of Elizabeth Kammerer, daughter of his friend Karen Kammerer, were done in August of 1996 at his home in Pawling. He also did portraits of Karen and Peter Cookson, brother of his dear friend Elise Cookson Dallemagne of Cherry Valley, New York, in 1996.
