= Oblong Friends Meeting House =

Historic meetinghouse in New York, United States

- Oblong Friends Meetinghouse
- U.S. National Register of Historic Places
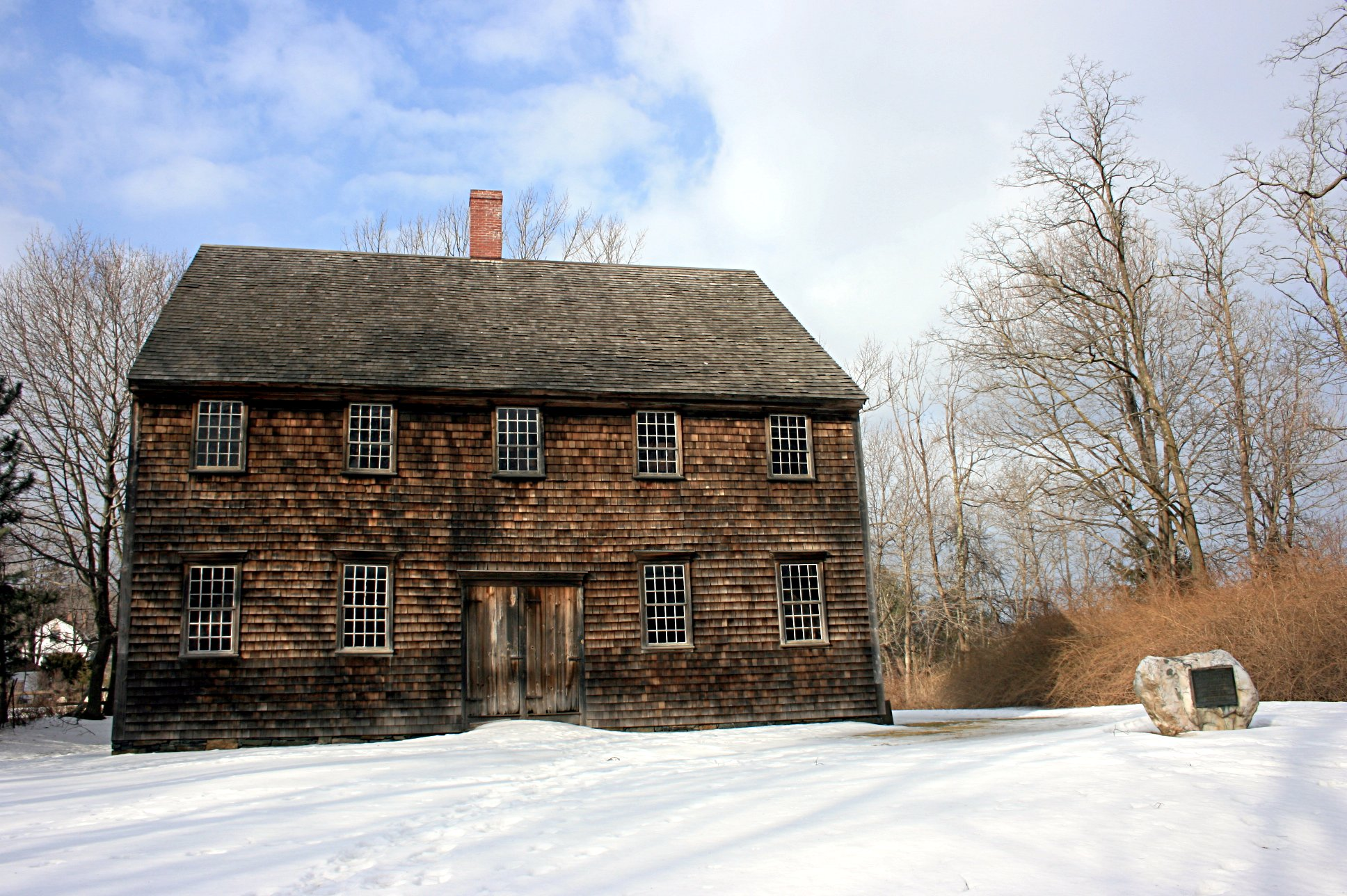
- Meeting House in March 2007
- Location: Meetinghouse Rd. on Quaker Hill, Pawling, NY
- Nearest city: Danbury, CT
- Coordinates: 41°34′46″N 73°32′32″W
- Area: 1 acre (0.40 ha)
- Built: 1763
- MPS: Dutchess County Quaker Meeting Houses TR
- NRHP reference No.: 73001182
- Added to NRHP: January 12, 1973

The Oblong Friends Meeting House is a mid-18th century Friends Meeting House of the Religious Society of Friends in the hamlet of Quaker Hill, in the town of Pawling, Dutchess County, New York, United States listed in the National Register of Historic Places since 1973.

Members of the Religious Society of Friends settled on Quaker Hill in the 1730s and sought permission to establish a meeting and build a meeting house in 1740. The first meeting house was constructed across from the present building in 1742, but as membership grew, this building became too small and in 1763, the Yearly Meeting decided to erect "a framed house of timber, the dimensions to be 45 feet (14 m) long, 40 feet (12 m) wide and 15 feet (4.6 m) stud to admit of galleries." This new house was built in 1764 and is the structure that has remained on the site since. Benjamin Sherman, carpenter of Quaker Hill, is credited with building the new Hicksite Meeting House in 1764.

In 1767, the question was raised in the meeting house whether it was "consistent with the Christian spirit to hold a person in slavery". After years of discussion, the question was answered in 1776 by the resolution that meetings were not to accept financial contributions or services from members owning slaves.

During the American Revolutionary War a portion of the Continental Army camped in the nearby hills, both during the fall of 1778 and the winter of 1779. The meeting house was commandeered by General Washington's officers to be used as a military hospital.

In 1828, the New York Meeting of the Society of Friends split into the Orthodox and Hicksite Societies of Friends. From then on, the Hicksites used the Meeting House, and the Orthodox Society, which had fewer members, built its own meeting house in 1831, just 200 feet (61 m) to the northwest. The latter building was later converted into a private residence.

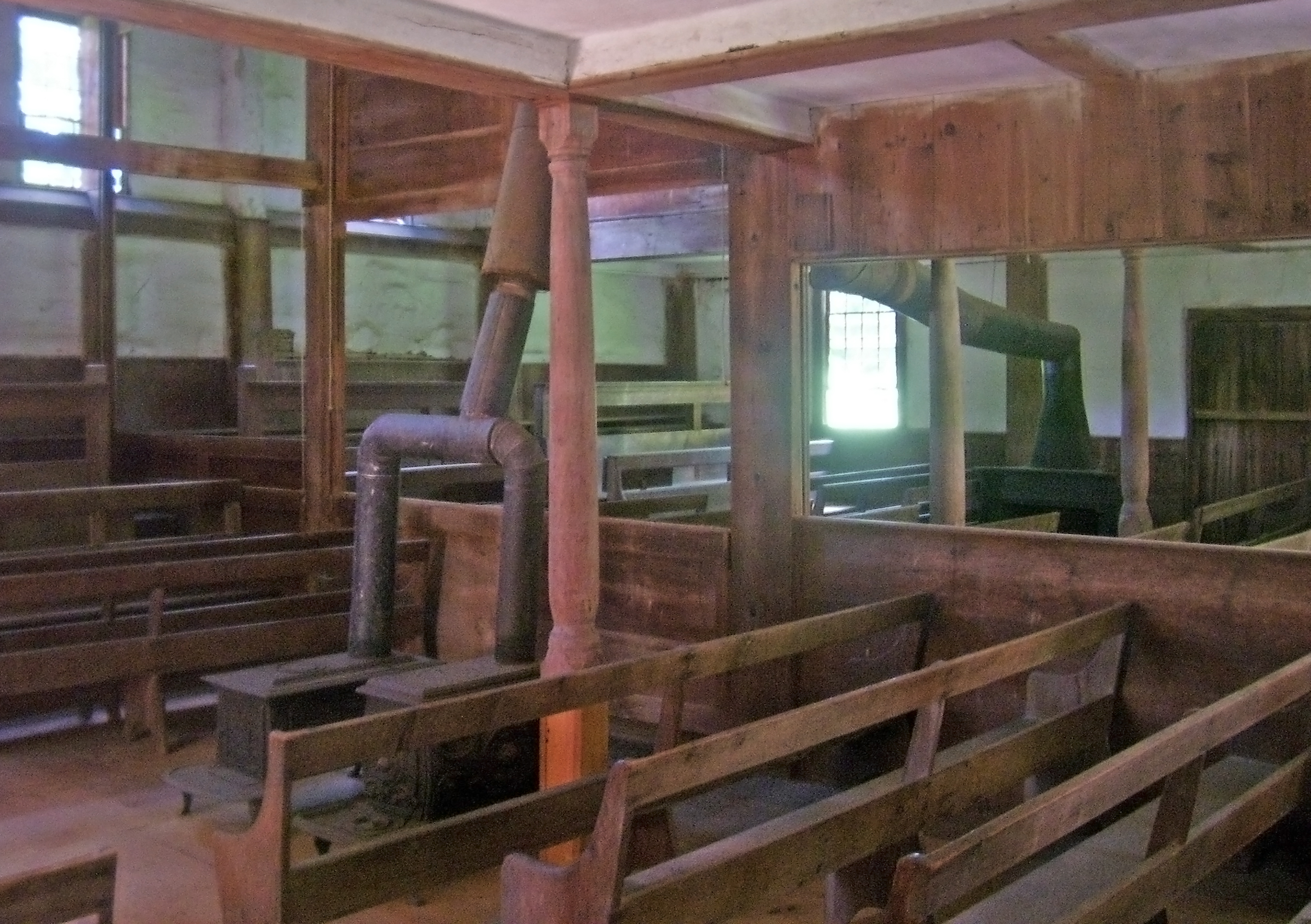
Interior

Membership in the area's Society of Friends declined in the course of the 19th century and the meetings were "laid down" in 1885. The property was acquired by the Historical Society of Quaker Hill and Pawling in 1936 which has preserved the building since then.

The building is a two-story building, five bays wide and two bays deep. Inside the shingled structure, there are sliding panels which divide the men's and women's portions of the building. As with most meeting houses, there are two front doors, one for each gender.

== Location ==
The Meeting House is located on the north side of Meeting House Road, about 100 meters from where it branches off from Quaker Hill Road, in the Hamlet of Quaker Hill, Town of Pawling, NY.

== See also ==
- List of Quaker meeting houses
- National Register of Historic Places listings in Dutchess County, New York
