= Quaker Hill, New York =

- Unincorporated
- Location in New York Location in the United States
- Coordinates: 41°34′46.34″N 73°32′34.45″W
- Country: United States
- U.S. state: New York
- County: Dutchess
- Region: Hudson Valley
- Town: Pawling

Quaker Hill is a hamlet in the town of Pawling in Dutchess County, New York, United States. The community shares its name with the twelve-mile-long ridge on which it is located; the ridge is located near the Connecticut state line. Quaker Hill is in the southern portion of the area known as the "Oblong" that was designated by the Treaty of Dover in 1731, and "known from pre-Revolutionary times as Quaker Hill". In colonial times, Quaker Hill separated "the English [settlers] of New England and the Hudson Valley Dutch population."

It is the location of the Oblong Friends Meetinghouse, built in 1764. According to historian Richard Norton Smith, "the first antislavery protest meeting in North America convened" in 1767 in the Oblong Friends Meetinghouse. One addition to the Oblong Friends Meetinghouse, the Akin Free Library, is also listed on the National Register of Historic Places.

In 1926 the prominent radio broadcaster and reporter Lowell Thomas, who had made Lawrence of Arabia famous, purchased a 350-acre farm on Quaker Hill, which he later enlarged to 2,000 acres and named "Clover Brook Farm." Thomas developed Quaker Hill into a well-known haven for numerous successful business, news media, political, and legal figures. To keep the rural flavor of the area, Thomas forbade the building of shopping centers, large businesses or factories, or extensive housing developments on Quaker Hill while he lived there. Instead, individual lots and existing farms were sold to families who met with his approval. Approximately one hundred families settled there, usually under the guidance of Thomas and his real-estate agents. Among the prominent figures who lived on Quaker Hill at one time or another from the 1930s to the 1970s were New York Governor and two-time Republican presidential nominee Thomas E. Dewey, the Reverend Norman Vincent Peale, famed CBS News journalist Edward R. Murrow, and Casey Hogate, the publisher of The Wall Street Journal. In 1953, Thomas moved to a larger estate he built on Quaker Hill called Hammersley Hill.

Thomas also transformed Quaker Hill while he was in residence there. He persuaded professional golfer Gene Sarazen and golf course architect Robert Trent Jones into building a country club and golf course on the northern part of the hill, and he built ski slopes and ski tows on the hill. Thomas held regular Saturday evening parties and dances for the residents of Quaker Hill at a community center he built called the Barn. In its fireplace, he "installed stones from the Great Pyramid of Cheops, the Parthenon, St. Peter's Cathedral, China's Great Wall, and Mount Vernon." He transformed a stone library on the hill, called Akin Hall, into a "nondenominational place of worship in Christopher Wren style." An avid horseman, he also established more than 200 miles of bridle paths that stretched across Quaker Hill.

The community has been studied extensively. It was the subject of a Columbia University political science Ph.D. dissertation completed in 1907 by Warren Hugh Wilson, an early pioneering contributor to rural sociology.

== See also ==
- Marie Mattingly Meloney, lived in Quaker Hill
