= Martha Routh =

British Quaker minister and writer

- Born: June 25, 1743; Stourbridge
- Died: July 18, 1817 (aged 74); Spitalfields
- Spouse: Richard Routh

Martha Routh or Martha Winter (25 June 1743 – 18 July 1817) was a British Quaker minister and writer.

== Life ==
Martha Winter was the last child, born in Stourbridge in 1743, to Henry and Jane Winter. She had nine siblings, although only five survived childhood.

By the age of 24, she was the head of a Quaker boarding school in Nottingham after starting to teach there when she was seventeen. She was made a minister in 1773 and, after her marriage to Richard Routh in 1776, she devoted herself to Quaker ministry. Over the next few years, she went to all parts of Great Britain and Ireland.

In 1794, she went on a tour of America preaching the gospel with John Wigham from Scotland. She was there for over three years and she traveled about 11,000 miles. She returned again in 1801.

Routh died in Spitalfields in 1817.
