= Whaley Lake =

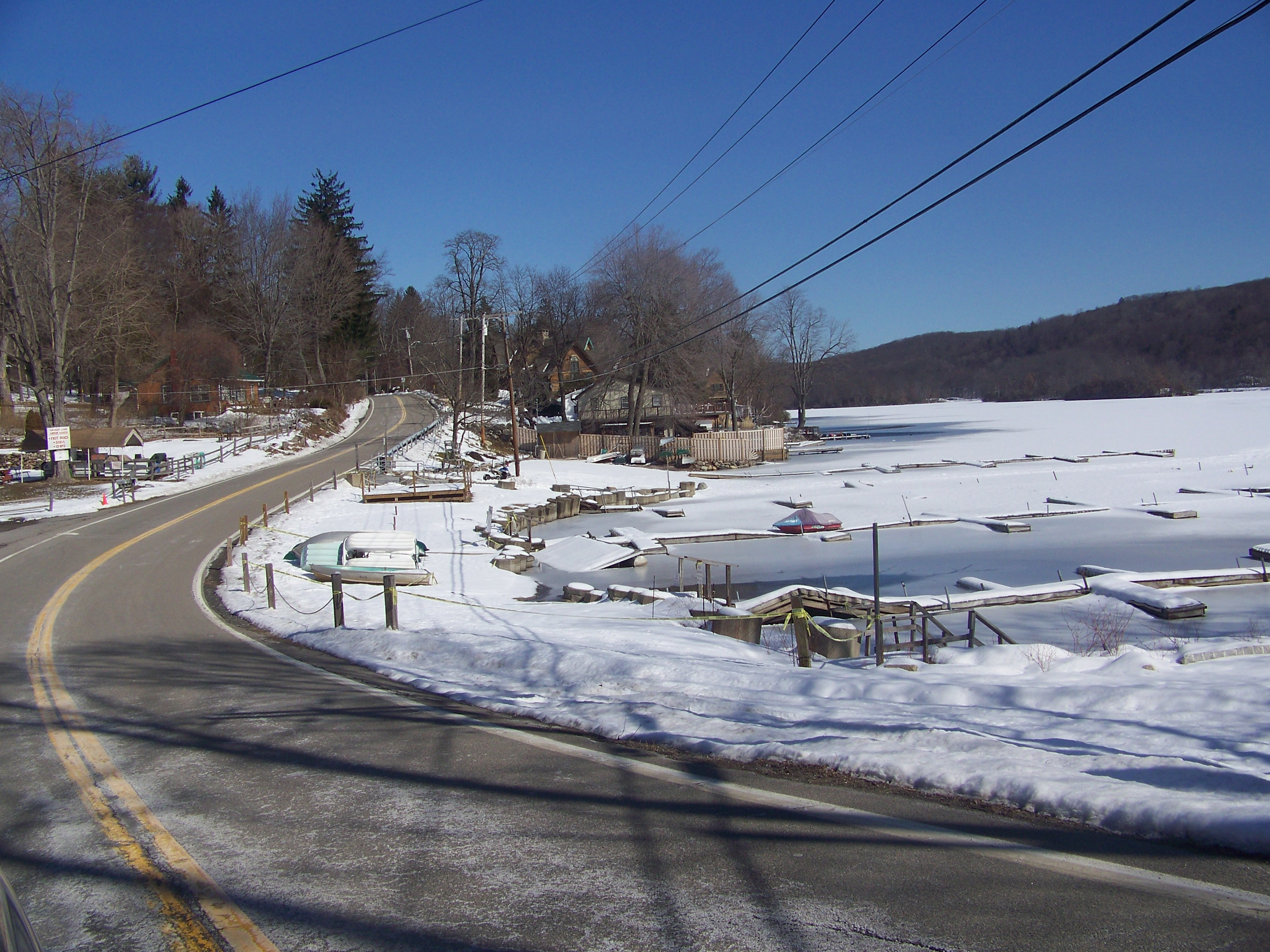
- Whaley Lake near NY 292

- Location within New York
- Location: Dutchess County, New York
- Coordinates: 41°33′30″N 73°39′45″W
- Type: reservoir, natural lake
- Primary outflows: Whaley Lake Stream
- Catchment area: 3.7 square miles (9.6 km^{2})
- Basin countries: United States
- Surface area: 252 acres (102 ha)
- Surface elevation: 705 feet (215 m)

Whaley Lake is located in the town of Pawling in southeastern Dutchess County in New York State, United States. It is the largest lake in Dutchess County.

The lake is partially man-made as it is controlled by a dam at its northern end. The lake feeds into the Fishkill Creek which empties into the Hudson River at Beacon, New York.

The lake is accessible via New York State Route 292, which runs along the south and west sides of the lake. The eastern shore of Whaley Lake is bordered by Metro-North Railroad's unused Beacon Line, and the Maybrook Trailway, which is a part of the Empire State Trail.
