= Ball's Bluff Battlefield and National Cemetery =

Historic site in Loudoun County, Virginia, US

- U.S. National Register of Historic Places
- U.S. National Historic Landmark District
- Virginia Landmarks Register
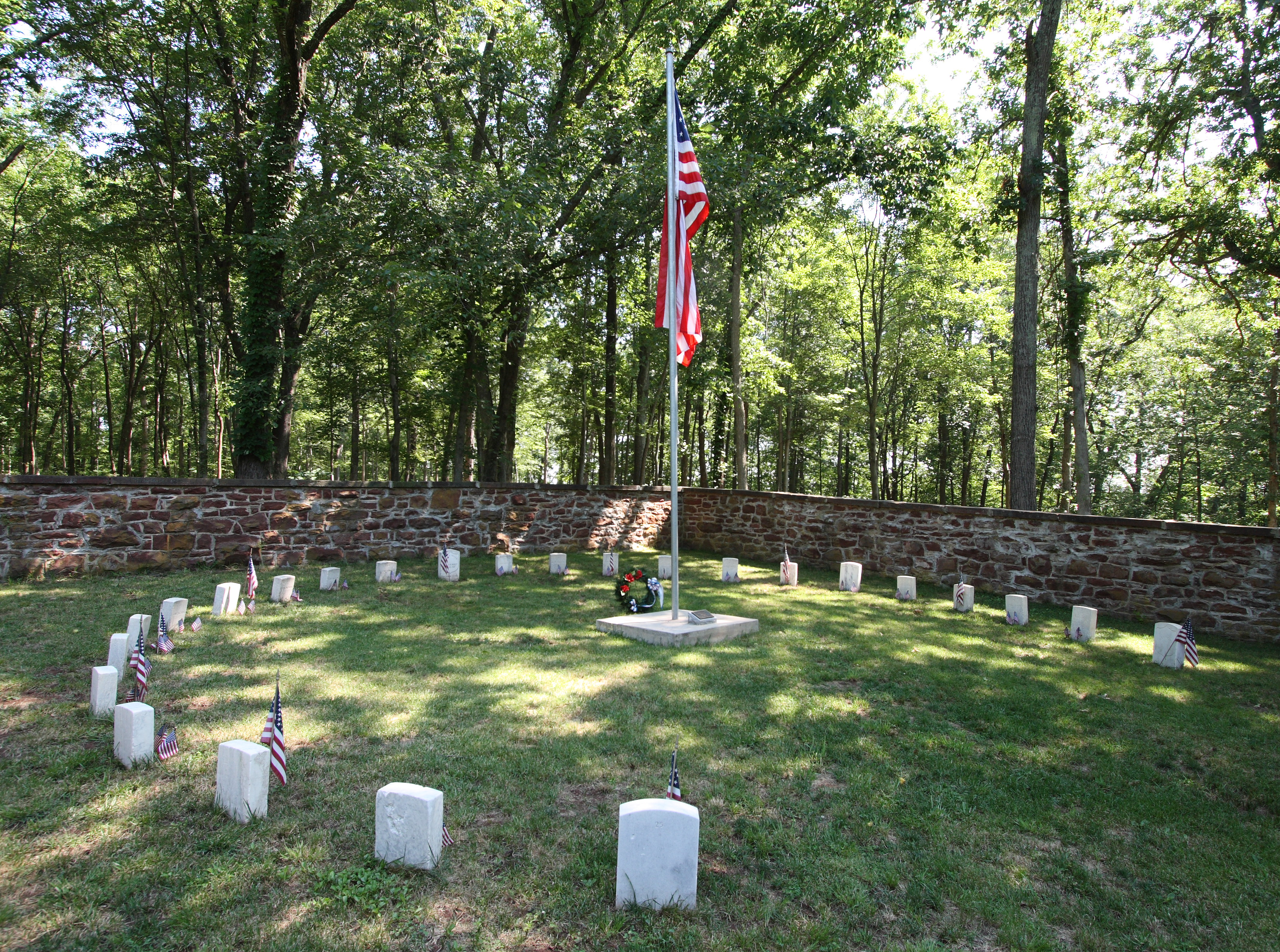
- The circle of 25 graves at Ball's Bluff

- Location within Northern Virginia Location within Virginia Location within the United States
- Location: Loudoun County, Virginia, US
- Nearest city: Leesburg, Virginia
- Coordinates: 39°07′55″N 77°31′47″W
- Area: 76 acres (31 ha)
- NRHP reference No.: 84003880
- VLR No.: 253-5021

Significant dates
- Added to NRHP: April 27, 1984
- Designated NHLD: April 27, 1984
- Designated VLR: October 16, 1984

Ball's Bluff Battlefield Regional Park and National Cemetery is a battlefield area and a United States National Cemetery, located 2 miles (3.2 km) northeast of Leesburg, Virginia. The cemetery is the third smallest national cemetery in the United States. Fifty-four Union Army dead from the Battle of Ball's Bluff are interred in 25 graves in the half-acre plot; the identity of all of the interred except for one, James Allen of the 15th Massachusetts, are unknown. Monuments to fallen Confederate Sergeant Clinton Hatcher and Union brigade commander Edward Dickinson Baker are located next to the cemetery, though neither is buried there. While the stone wall-enclosed cemetery itself is managed through the Culpeper National Cemetery and owned by the Department of Veterans Affairs, the balance of the 223-acre (0.90 km^{2}) park is managed through the Northern Virginia Regional Park Authority.

== Battle ==
The Battle of Ball's Bluff was a small but consequential defeat for the Union early in the American Civil War, occurring just months after the Union Army's rout after the First Battle of Bull Run and another embarrassing loss at Battle of Wilson's Creek in the Western Theater. The Union defeat at Ball's Bluff revealed something to the public about the political nature of Union appointments of officers and their occasional incompetence, and led directly to the creation of the Joint Committee on the Conduct of the War.

On October 21, 1861, Union Colonel Edward D. Baker, a U.S. Senator from Oregon and close friend of President Abraham Lincoln, was given orders from Brigadier General Charles P. Stone to either withdraw Massachusetts troops who already had landed on the Virginia side of the Potomac River to reconnoiter and raid a Confederate camp north of Leesburg, or reinforce the expedition in the event the raid was successful, at his discretion. Before Baker could discover the true nature of the situation, Confederates pickets detected and fired upon the Union force, and local Confederate district commander Col. Nathan "Shanks" Evans quickly deployed his Virginia and Mississippi regiments against the threat, while still presenting a defense against a larger Union crossing downriver at Edwards Ferry. The inexperienced Baker crossed additional companies to the bluff, but positioned his troops poorly, with the peak of the bluff against their back and higher ground in front of their lines.

After a prolonged firefight, the Confederate pressure broke the Federal line, and the assault pushed the Union troops down the difficult terrain and onto the river bank, killing Baker and 222 others, wounding 226, and eventually capturing 553. The few boats available became quickly overloaded and some capsized due to overcrowding, so evacuation became impossible. Some swam across to nearby Harrison Island, but 161 went missing, many of them drowned in the swollen Potomac. Bodies of Union troops who had drowned floated downstream towards Washington, D.C. for days after the battle.

== Aftermath ==
Wartime Washington, D.C. was horrified by Baker's death. At the opening of the second session of the 37th Congress in December, the eulogies for the late senator went on for days. An investigative Joint Committee on the Conduct of the War was formed to examine the causes of the recent defeats, particularly actions related to the death of Baker, Lincoln's close friend. Such congressional investigations, more common since, had only very weak precedents at the time. The committee's operations were arguably an aggravation for the duration of the war, and ultimately ruined the career of General Stone, who was held accountable for Baker's defeat at Ball's Bluff. Army of the Potomac commanding general George B. McClellan, who was responsible at a larger level and had issued vague orders which set in motion the debacle, escaped blame.

== Cemetery, landmark, park ==
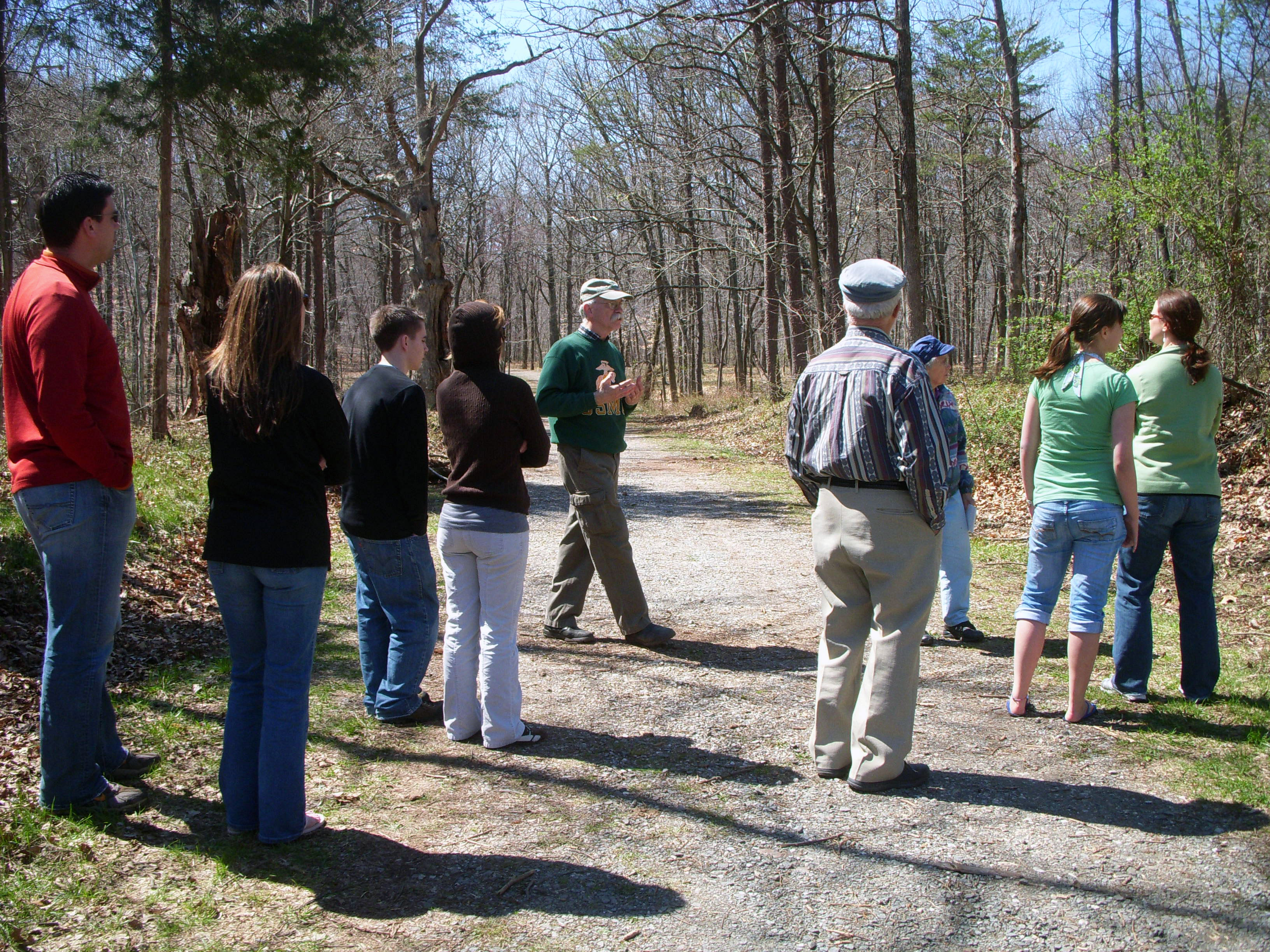
Local battlefield guide conducts a tour at the Ball's Bluff Battlefield and National Cemetery, April 4, 2009.

The land for a cemetery was donated in 1865.

The battlefield area was declared a National Historic Landmark in 1984. At that time the 300-foot (91 m) tall bluff, the landing on the Potomac River, and almost all aspects of the site were substantially the same as the time of the battle 123 years before. An "intrusion" is the wall-enclosed Ball's Bluff National Cemetery, holding 54 graves of Union dead (53 unknown, and James Allen of the 15th Massachusetts Infantry). Another intrusion is a fenced 1.3-mile (2.1 km) approach road built in 1907. A commemorative marker for Confederate soldier Clinton Hatcher, of the 8th Virginia Infantry, and a marker of the site of Baker's mortal wounding, are nearby.

The regional park, maintained by the Northern Virginia Regional Park Authority, contains over seven miles (11 km) of marked trails, including a mile-long loop trail to the bluff overlook with interpretive markers and 2.1-mile (3.4 km) trail along the Potomac riverbank.

== See also ==
- List of National Historic Landmarks in Virginia
- National Register of Historic Places listings in Loudoun County, Virginia
