= Charles Pomeroy Stone =

American general, engineer, and surveyor (1824–1887)

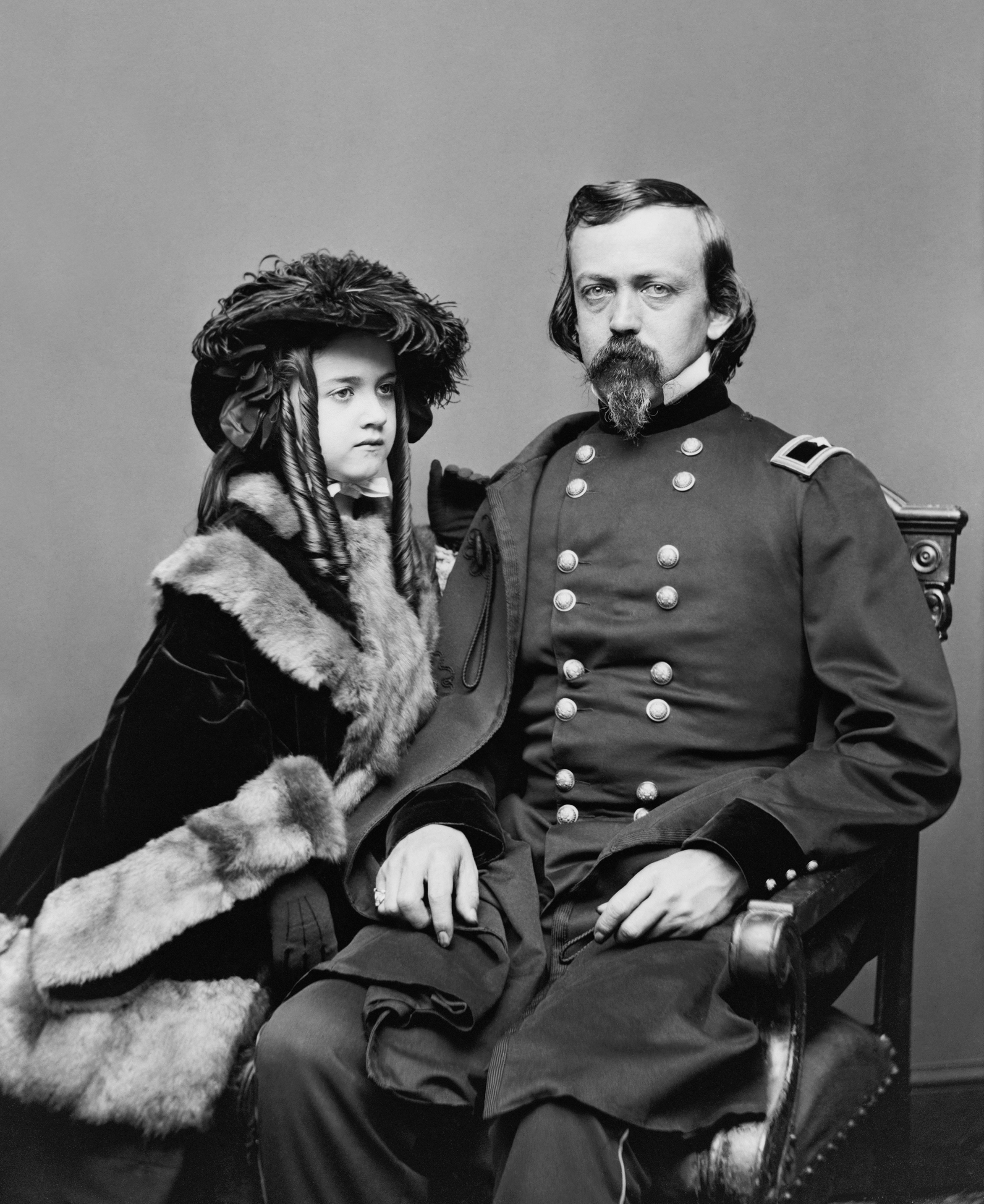
- Charles Pomeroy Stone and his daughter Esther, who was known as Hettie, photographed together in the spring of 1863; Stone's USMA class ring can be seen on the little finger of his right hand.
- Born: September 30, 1824; Greenfield, Massachusetts, US
- Died: January 24, 1887 (aged 62); New York City, US
- Burial place: West Point Cemetery, New York, US
- Military career
- Allegiance: United States; Khedivate of Egypt
- Branch: United States Army; Egyptian Army
- Service years: 1845–1856, 1861–1864 (United States); 1870–83 (Egypt)
- Rank: Brigadier General; Fariq (Egypt)
- Commands: Benicia Arsenal; Defenses of Washington, D.C. 14th Infantry Regiment; Corps of Observation; Chief of Staff, Army of the Gulf; Chief of Staff, Egyptian Army
- Conflicts: Mexican–American War; Siege of Veracruz; Battle of Contreras; Battle of Molino del Rey; Battle of Chapultepec; American Civil War; Occupation of Alexandria; Rockville Expedition; Manassas campaign; Battle of Hoke's Run; Battle of Ball's Bluff; Siege of Port Hudson; Bayou Teche campaign; Red River campaign; Battle of Sabine Cross Roads; Battle of Pleasant Hill; Siege of Petersburg; Battle of Globe Tavern
- Awards: Commander of the Order of Osmanieh; Grand Officer of the Order of the Medjidie; Commander of the Order of the Crown of Italy

Charles Pomeroy Stone (September 30, 1824 – January 24, 1887) was a career United States Army officer, civil engineer, and surveyor. He fought with distinction in the Mexican–American War, earning two brevet promotions for his performance in the conflict. After resigning and surveying for the Mexican Government, he returned to the U.S. Army to fight in the American Civil War.

Stone was reportedly the first volunteer to enter the Union Army, and during the war he served as a general officer, noted for his involvement at the Battle of Ball's Bluff in October 1861. Held responsible for the Union defeat, Stone was arrested and imprisoned for almost six months, mostly for political reasons. He never received a trial, and after his release he would not hold a significant command during the war again. Stone later served again with distinction as a general in the Egyptian Army, and is also noted for his role in constructing the base of the Statue of Liberty.

== Early life ==
Stone was born in Greenfield, Massachusetts, a son of Alpheus Fletcher Stone, the town's doctor, and his wife Fanny Cushing. He was one of ten children in a Protestant family of Puritan descent. In 1841 he entered the United States Military Academy at West Point and graduated four years later, standing seventh out of 41 cadets. His time at the academy was shared with a number of other recruits who would go on to have important roles in the Civil War and the lead-up to it, including such ardent secessionists as William Logan Crittenden. He was appointed a brevet second lieutenant of ordnance on July 1, 1845. He and his younger sister, Fanny Cushing Parker (1827–1898), were Roman Catholic converts.

== Military career, marriage and civilian career ==
=== Ordnance officer ===
Stone stayed at West Point, serving as an assistant professor and teaching geography, history, and also ethics from August 28, 1845, to January 13, 1846. Afterwards he was posted to the Watervliet Arsenal in New York as Assistant Ordnance Officer, and then to Fortress Monroe at Old Point Comfort, Virginia, both in 1846. While there Stone worked in the facilities arsenal and was an assistant to Capt. Benjamin Huger, whom he would serve under in the war with Mexico.

=== Mexican war ===
Fighting with Maj. Gen. Winfield Scott's army in the Mexican–American War, Stone was promoted to second lieutenant on March 3, 1847. He first saw action during the siege of Veracruz from March 9–29, then the skirmishing near Amazoque on May 14, and the Battle of Contreras on August 19–20. Stone then fought notably during the Battle of Molino del Rey on September 8, and was appointed a brevet first lieutenant from that date for "gallant and meritorious conduct" in this fight.

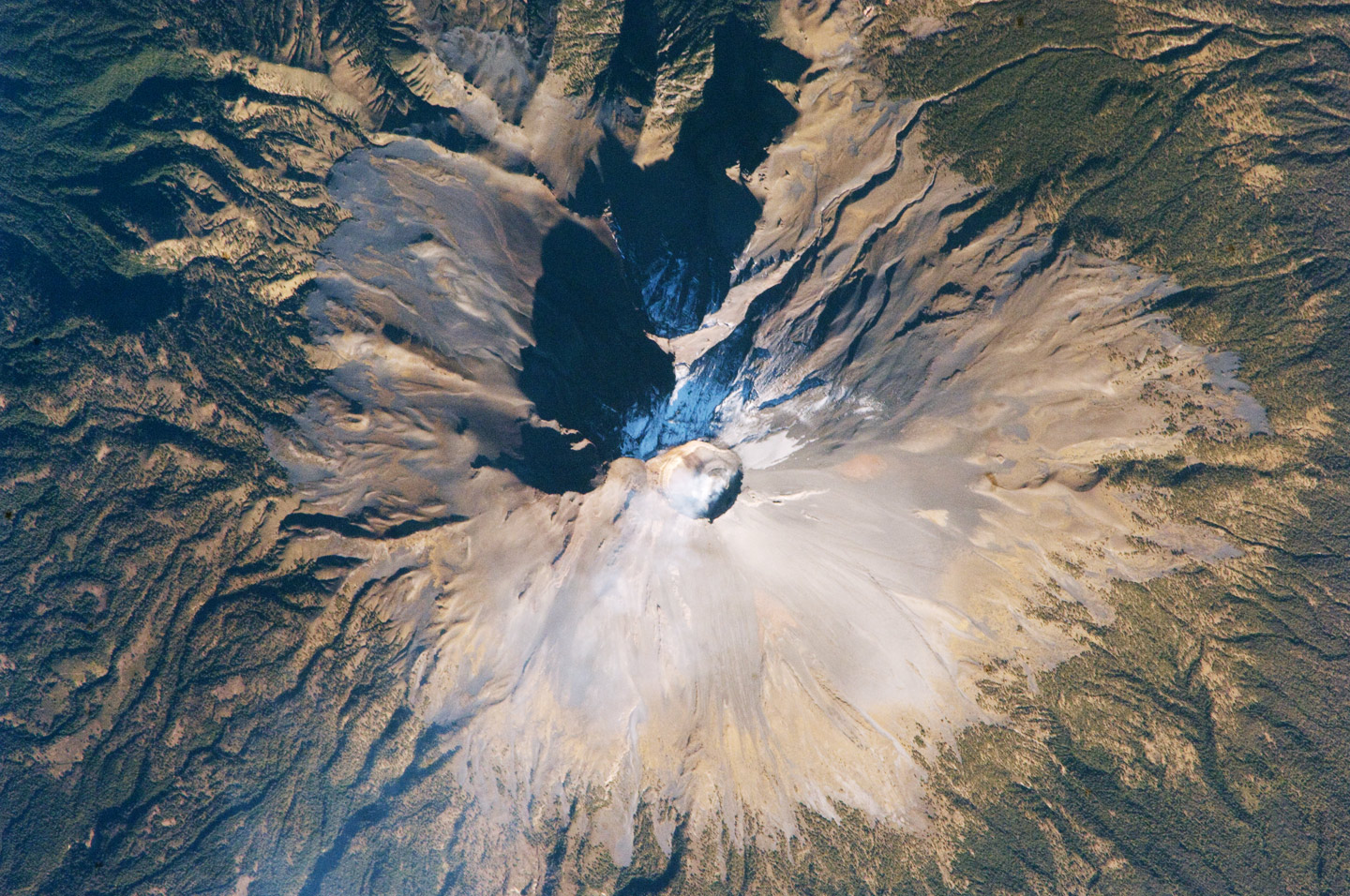
Mexico's Popocatépetl volcano in 2009; Stone climbed its summit in 1848.

On September 13, 1847, Stone participated in the Battle of Chapultepec, and was appointed a brevet captain for his conduct on that day. He then fought in the Battle for Mexico City until September 15, and was part of a successful climbing party of the volcano at Popocatepetl, raising an American Flag at its summit. He was an original member of the Aztec Club of 1847, a military society formed by U.S. Army officers who had served in Mexico.

=== Pacific coast ===
After the war with Mexico ended, Stone returned to the Watervliet Arsenal in 1848, again taking up his position as Assistant Ordnance Officer. He then was granted a leave of absence from the U.S. Army, and proceeded to Europe to study military practices of the armies there for two years. In 1850 he resumed duty at the Watervliet Arsenal briefly, and then was given command of the Ft. Monroe Arsenal into 1851. Later that year Stone was appointed Chief of Ordnance for the Pacific Department, a post he held until 1855, and also began construction of the Benicia Arsenal in California that year. In December 1851, he served as a judge in the court martial of Joseph Hooker. Hooker was the assistant adjutant general of the Pacific Division in nearby Sonoma, California. He faced charges of conduct unbecoming an officer and a gentleman for profiteering from the army. At that same time, Stone was supposed to serve on the court martial of George H. Derby, which was combined with Hooker's trial. However, he was excused because he had a strong personal dislike of Derby. During this time he was promoted to the rank of first lieutenant, effective February 26, 1853.

=== Marriage ===
In 1853, Stone married Maria Louisa Clary, daughter of Esther Philipson and Robert Emmett Clary.

=== Post-military career ===
On November 17, 1856, he resigned his commission in the U.S. Army, "finding the pay inadequate" for his family. He briefly became a banker in 1856 in San Francisco, but the bank failed the following year due to the "…absconding of its treasurer". Stone then went back to Mexico, where he worked in various government jobs. From 1857 to 1860 he surveyed the Mexican state of Sonora, and from 1858 to 1860 he surveyed the lower region of California. Also from 1858 to 1859 Stone served as acting consul at Guaymas, Mexico, the municipal center of Sonora. In 1860 he moved his family back to the U.S., settling in Washington, D.C. In 1861 he published his survey findings, entitled Notes on the State of Sonora.

=== Civil War ===
At the outbreak of secession, Stone found himself in Washington writing his report on Sonora. After a dinner with his former commander Winfield Scott, Stone was requested to be Inspector General of the District of Columbia Militia at the rank of colonel as of January 1, 1861, and was thus reputed to be the first volunteer officer mustered into the Union Army before the Civil War. In this role, he secured the capital for the arrival of President-elect Abraham Lincoln, and was personally responsible for security at the new president's inaugural. One of his most important acts in this role was to frustrate an attempt by southern militias and the secret society known as the Knights of the Golden Circle to carry out a coup against the nascent Lincoln administration. Stone received word that militia groups from Baltimore and surrounding areas intended to infiltrate Washington, D.C., and seize the city by force during Lincoln's inauguration. He dealt with two militia officers (whom he knew to be secessionists) promptly: First Stone maneuvered one commander ("Doctor B---" of the "National Volunteers Company") into handing Stone a full 100-man roster of his 300 men company to receive an order for arms; Stone accepted the roster and locked it into a desk drawer and wished the commander good morning; in turn the commander left his Washington D.C. home to give service to the Confederacy, his organization broken up; the second officer ("Captain Schaeffer" of the "National Rifles" company) was forced by Stone to give up two howitzers; as well as sabers and revolvers to the D.C. Armory on the grounds such weapons did not belong to a rifle company. Stone's next offer to the man was a commission of Major. The man declined to take the Oath of Office and then found out he had lost his commission of captain as well since he had not enclosed a copy of the Oath of Office with his letter of acceptance. Schaeffer and the secession members left the "National rifles" Company which was transformed by Stone into a loyal Union company under Lt (elected Captain) Smead. Stone's prompt actions disintegrated the plot against the inaugural. Stone was appointed Colonel of the 14th U.S. Infantry Regiment on May 14, and then a brigadier general in the Union Army that August, to rank from May 17. He commanded a brigade in Maj. Gen. Robert Patterson's Army of the Shenandoah during the First Bull Run campaign in June and July. Stone then was given command of a division, called the Corps of Observation, guarding the fords along the upper Potomac River that fall.

In his efforts to carry out his orders and maintain discipline, Stone drew the attention and wrath of his home state's governor, John A. Andrew, and Charles Sumner, the senior U.S. senator from Massachusetts, both powerful and influential Radical Republican politicians. In late September Stone issued general orders that required his men "not to incite and encourage insubordination among the coloured servants in the neighbourhood". When two runaway slaves came into their lines, one of his regiments, the 20th Massachusetts Infantry, promptly caught them and returned them to their owner. This was done in compliance with Stone's orders as well as both Federal and Maryland law. However, many of the 20th Massachusetts were abolitionists, who disagreed with Stone's insistence on returning runaways back into slavery and wrote both their families and their representatives about the incident. Governor Andrew strongly reprimanded the colonel of the regiment, who gave the letter to Stone. After reading it Stone wrote back, its contents summarized by military historian Bruce Catton as follows: "this regiment was in United States service now and the governor had no business meddling with discipline, the young lieutenant and the colonel had properly done what they were told to do and were not subject to reprimand from any governor, and would the governor in future please keep his hand off?"

More heated letters passed between Andrew and Stone, and then Andrew involved Sumner, who quickly and strongly denounced Stone to the U.S. Senate. Stone's written response to this—described as "in terms so bitter that it almost seemed as if he were challenging the senator to duel"—further inflamed the situation. Stone's dealings with these two men would have tragic consequences in his near future.

==== Ball's Bluff ====
On October 20, 1861, Stone was ordered by Maj. Gen. George B. McClellan to conduct a reconnaissance across the Potomac River to report on Confederate activities in Leesburg, Virginia. McClellan also hoped this action, combined with a movement by Brig. Gen. George A. McCall's division of 13,000 men toward Dranesville the day before, would encourage a Confederate withdrawal from the area without an engagement occurring. This message from McClellan's staff related the situation and outlined Stone's orders:

General McCall occupied Dranesville yesterday, and is still there. Will send out heavy reconnaissances today in all directions from that point. The general desires that you keep a good lookout upon Leesburg, to see if this movement has the effect to drive them away. Perhaps a slight demonstration on your part would have the effect to move them.

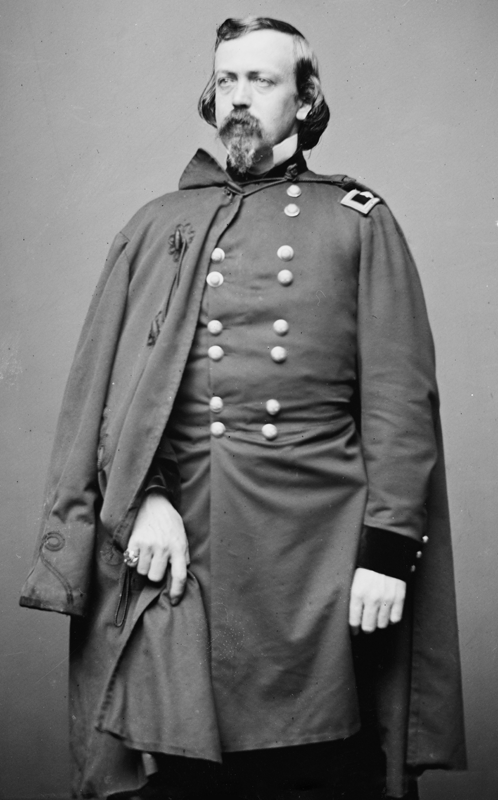
Brig. Gen. Charles P. Stone

From this order Stone reasonably believed he had support nearby from McCall if needed; what he did not know was that McClellan had ordered McCall back to his previous position at Langley on October 21, putting any help for Stone further away. Stone's division numbered about 10,000 men and was posted around Poolesville, Maryland, about eight miles from Leesburg, with portions of his command at points along the Potomac shore. He moved his artillery to Edward's Ferry along the Potomac, from which he could shell the woods on the opposite side of the river, held by Confederate forces. Stone then sent three small boats with about 100 men from the 1st Minnesota Infantry across, who returned shortly without incident. Near sunset he sent out a small patrol of 20 soldiers of the 15th Massachusetts Infantry to scout toward Leesburg and see whether the Union movements had the desired effect or not. Crossing at Harrison's Island on the river, these men scaled Ball's Bluff and encountered what they believed was a Confederate camp of at least thirty men less than a mile inland. The patrol returned to Harrison's Island around 10 p.m. and reported by messenger to Stone at Edwards Ferry.

In response to this report, Stone thought the Confederate forces were indeed leaving Leesburg and decided to investigate further. While he led part of his command directly across at Edwards Ferry at 5 p.m., Stone ordered Col. Charles Devens and 300 men of his 15th Massachusetts to immediately cross over to Ball's Bluff that night. Stone's instructions were to "March silently under cover of night to the position of the camp [and] attack and destroy it at daybreak… and return rapidly to the island". Devens carried out Stone's orders and made the difficult crossing on three small 10-man boats, taking him four hours to accomplish. Stone also gave Devens discretion over what to do after the attack; either hold Leesburg or return to Harrison's Island. Stone ordered the rest of the 15th Massachusetts over and added the 20th Massachusetts Infantry, under Col. William R. Lee, to this effort as well, and ordered Colonel and U.S. Senator Edward D. Baker to take overall command. Devens found no camp since an earlier patrol apparently confused corn shocks as tents in the evening shadows; he halted and asked Stone for instructions, who responded to push closer to Leesburg. Devens determined to hold there, waiting several hours for reinforcements, when skirmishing began at 7 a.m., before Baker had arrived.

Confederate Col. Nathan G. "Shanks" Evans was in charge of the forces opposing Stone, and when he learned of the crossings he split his 2,000-man command. Three of his regiments were ordered to deal with Stone by blocking the road from Edwards Ferry to Leesburg, while the remainder fought and defeated Baker's force at Ball's Bluff. Since Baker sent no updates, Stone had no idea a battle was occurring there and, finding his path blocked by Confederates, Stone returned to Edwards Ferry. He then moved toward Harrison's Island, learned of the defeat at Ball's Bluff, and quickly asked McClellan for help from McCall, whom he thought nearby but was actually more than twenty miles away.

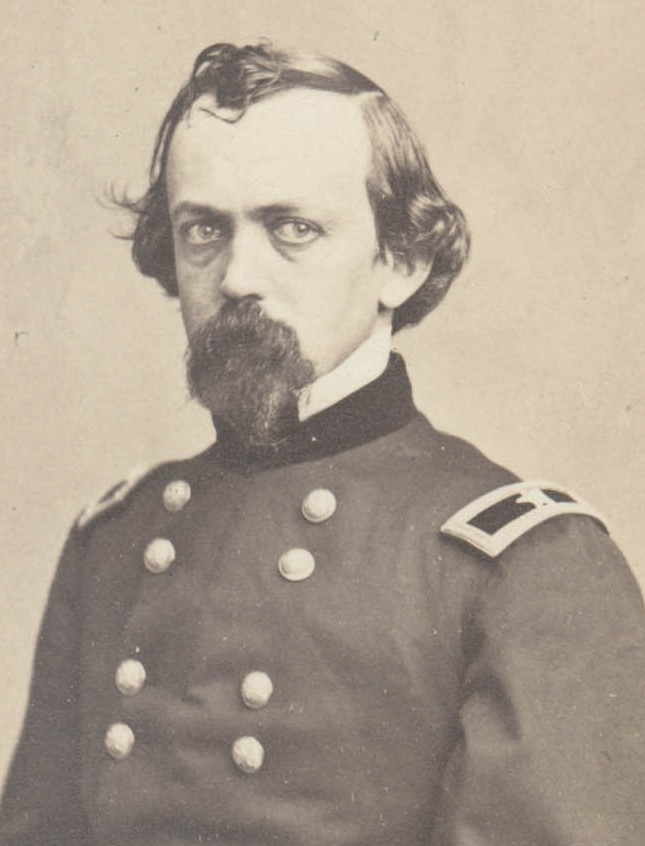
Stone as a Union Army general officer

Stone lost about 1,000 men who were either killed, wounded, captured, or drowned during Ball's Bluff, while the Confederates lost less than 160. The Union total included Baker, the only sitting U.S. Senator killed in combat when "four bullets ripped into him, and he was dead before he hit the ground". Baker's death and the action at Ball's Bluff would have serious consequences for Stone, and also affect the way the American Civil War would be prosecuted. In his official report about the battle on October 24, McClellan did not hold Stone personally responsible for the defeat, saying "The disaster was caused by errors committed by the immediate Commander— not General Stone".

==== Arrest and imprisonment ====
Stone bore the brunt of much public criticism; the U.S. Congress Joint Committee on the Conduct of the War was established in the wake of Baker's congressional eulogies and anger over the defeat. This seven-man group called Stone as one of their first witnesses about the Ball's Bluff affair, and all testimony given by him and 38 others was kept secret. Before the end of October 1861, Stone's official report about Ball's Bluff had been leaked to the New York Tribune newspaper, and in it Stone praised Baker's bravery but made clear his shortcomings as a field commander. Baker's congressional allies, among them Governor Andrew and Senator Sumner, openly denounced this report and began to point accusing fingers at Stone, not at Baker. Stone's loyalty to the Union and position on slavery were more in question than his military abilities and decisions. The committee's questions accused him of improper and frequent communications with the Confederates, of not re-enforcing Baker, of using his men to protect slaveholder property in Maryland, and of returning runaway slaves to their owners—despite the last two of these following Maryland as well as Federal law. Another problem for Stone defending himself was an order from McClellan forbidding him to give testimony "regarding his [McClellan's] plans, his orders for the movement of troops, or his orders concerning the position of troops". This made it impossible for Stone to explain his movements to the committee, but kept McClellan out of the investigation as well.

If he is a traitor I am a traitor, and we are all traitors.

— Winfield Scott's reaction to Stone's arrest

Under a cloud for suspected disloyalty and treason, Stone was arrested just after midnight on February 8, 1862, on orders of Maj. Gen. McClellan, who was acting under orders from Secretary of War Edwin M. Stanton, dated January 28. Awaiting Stone near his home in Washington were 18 soldiers led by Brig. Gen. George Sykes. When Stone approached, Sykes stated "I have now the most disagreeable duty to perform that I ever had—it is to arrest you". When Stone angrily asked why, Sykes said "I don't know. It's by order of Maj. Gen. George B. McClellan, general-in-chief of the army… I may as well tell you that you are to be sent to Fort Lafayette". This shocked Stone, who stated "That's where they send secessionists! I have been as true a soldier to the Government as any in service".

Under guard, Stone was ordered to be sent to the military prison at Fort Lafayette by train. When he reached the rail depot at Philadelphia, confusion as to payment for his ticket caused Stone to buy his own ticket. Upon reaching the facility he was put immediately into solitary confinement, but he managed to hire an attorney and waited for official charges to be filed. According to the Articles of War this had to be done within eight days of an arrest, but was never done in Stone's case. He sent several inquiries to McClellan, to the army's adjutant general's office, and to Stanton himself, who stated " …the charges were being reviewed prior to being publicized…", but received no satisfactory explanation.

To hold one commander in prison untried is less harmful in times of great national distress than to withdraw several good officers from active battlefields to give him a trial.

— President Abraham Lincoln

Contrary to U.S. Army regulations as well, no charges were ever filed against Stone nor did he stand trial. While he was in solitary confinement at Fort Lafayette, he could not exercise, and consequently Stone's health began to degrade. His physicians protested heavily to Stanton, who ordered him transferred to the military prison at Fort Hamilton. There Stone was allowed to exercise and his condition improved. He stayed at Fort Lafayette for fifty days, and would spend another 139 in Fort Hamilton. Stone was finally released without explanation or apology on August 16, 1862. The reason for his release was new legislation written by California Senator James A. McDougall. In a small addition to another bill, McDougall reiterated the Articles of War requirement that official charges be filed within eight days of arrest, but went on to include that any imprisoned officer must be given their trial within thirty days. McDougall also made it clear this legislation applied to those currently under arrest, which covered Stone's case. It passed the U.S. Congress and was signed into law by President Lincoln on July 17, 1862. Stanton then waited the thirty days before releasing Stone.

It may, or may not be that President Lincoln ordered the arrest of Stone. In a communication of September 30, 1862, General in Chief H. W. Halleck wrote about Stone's arrest: "I understood that it was made by the orders of the President".

==== Release and reassignment ====
After his release, Stone returned home to Washington and awaited orders, and also continued to try to clear his name. Despite the arrest and confinement, Stone's services were still in demand. In September 1862, as the Maryland Campaign developed, McClellan asked the War Department to re-instate Stone, but Stanton declined. When Maj. Gen Joseph Hooker took over command of the Army of the Potomac in early 1863, he asked for Stone as his chief of staff, but Stanton denied this request as well. On February 27, Stone was finally allowed to hear the testimony that caused him to be arrested, and with McClellan no longer his commander Stone could freely answer the accusations. He did this to the Committee's satisfaction, who soon afterwards published its revised findings, clearing Stone. With the facts now known, The New York Times newspaper editorialized:

General Stone has sustained a most flagrant wrong—a wrong which will probably stand as the very worst blot on the National side in the history of the war.

Without assignment until May, Stone was ordered to the Department of the Gulf, serving as a member of the surrender commission at Port Hudson and in the Red River Campaign as Maj. Gen. Nathaniel P. Banks's chief of staff. However, on April 4, 1864, Stanton ordered Stone mustered out of his volunteer commission as a brigadier general and he reverted to his rank of colonel within the regular army. He served briefly as a brigade commander in the Army of the Potomac during the siege of Petersburg, but finally resigned from the Army on September 13, 1864, before the end of the war.

== Later life ==
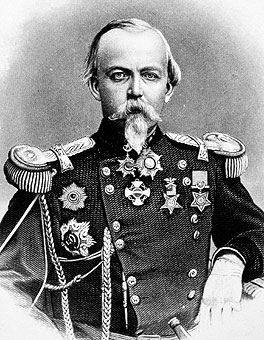
Stone Pasha in the Egyptian Army

After the American Civil War ended in 1865, Stone worked as an engineer and later superintendent for Virginia's Dover Mining Company until 1869. The following year William T. Sherman, by now the U.S. Army's Commanding General, recommended Stone for service in the Egyptian Army. From 1870 to 1883 he served as chief of staff and general aide-de-camp for the khedive Isma'il Pasha of Egypt. While there he was given the rank of ferik, equal to a lieutenant general, and the title of Ferik Pasha. Stone's career in the Egyptian Army has been described thus:

Stone served the Khedive well, implementing a general staff, expanding Egypt's boundaries, and establishing schools for the education of Egypt's soldiers and their children. He remained in the service of Khedive Ismail (and Ismail's successor, son Tewfik) for 13 years. When the British bombarded Alexandria, and Orabi led the revolt of the Egyptian army, Stone stayed with Tewfik in Alexandria, even while his wife and daughters were trapped in Cairo.

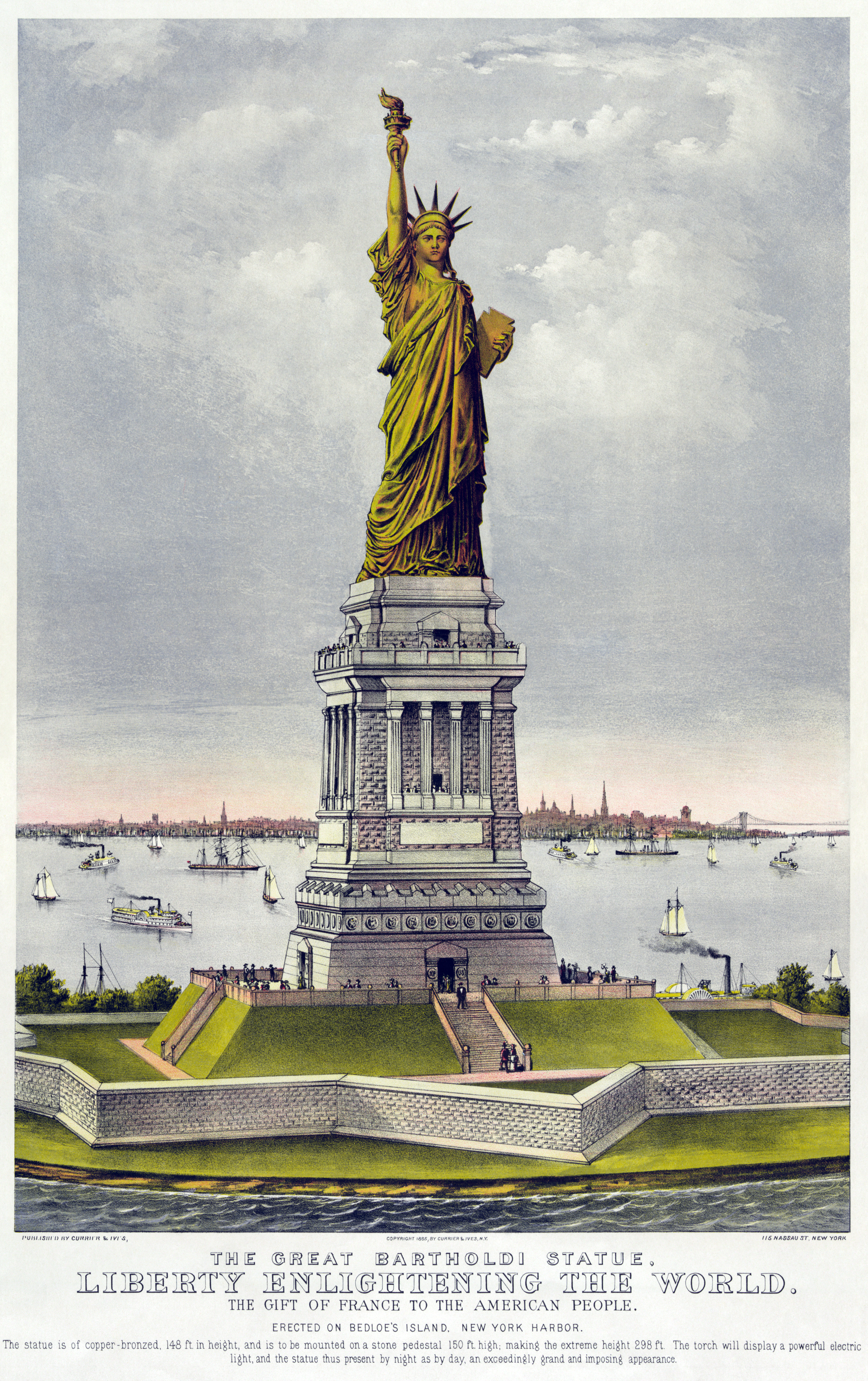
The Statue of Liberty

Stone later returned to the United States, where he worked as an engineer for the Florida Ship Canal Company in 1883. In 1884, he accepted the position of Chief Engineer of the Statue of Liberty project at Bedloe's Island, New York Harbor, and planned and supervised the construction of the Statue of Liberty's pedestal, concrete foundation and the reassembly of the Statue of Liberty after its arrival from France. Stone served as the grand marshal of the dedication parade in Manhattan on October 28, 1886. He fell ill some months afterwards and died of pneumonia at his home in New York City. General Stone is buried in West Point National Cemetery.

Stone's first wife Maria died in Washington, D.C., shortly after Stone's release from Fort Hamilton. While serving in New Orleans during 1863, Stone fell in love with Jeanne Stone and they had two daughters and a son, John Stone Stone, who later became a pioneer in the field of wireless telegraphy. Stone was also an original founding member of the Aztec Club of 1847, a social organization for officers who served in the Mexican–American War.

== Legacy ==
Military historian Ezra J. Warner held Stone's treatment following Ball's Bluff in disdain, saying in 1964:

The arrest and imprisonment of Stone is without parallel in the annals of American military and/or civil jurisprudence.... he was victim of a demonstration on the part of the Joint Committee on the Conduct of the War to avenge the death of one of their colleagues and to make it known that this was war to the knife, and a war to end slavery as well as to preserve the Union.

== See also ==
- List of American Civil War generals (Union)
- List of Massachusetts generals in the American Civil War
