= Joel Stratton =

Union army officer

Joel Augustus Stratton (1837–1920) was a Union Army Captain who served as commander of Company C, 53rd Massachusetts Volunteers during the American Civil War. He took part in the Battles of Fort Bisland and Port Hudson.

Stratton survived being struck in the head by a minié ball fired by a Confederate sharpshooter during one of the many Union assaults on the confederate entrenchments. The minie ball entered his left eye and exited out the back of his ear. Stratton fully recovered from the wound. He was eventually discharged when the 53rd Regiment was mustered out of service on September 2, 1863.

== Personal life ==
Stratton was born in Leominster, Massachusetts on March 9, 1837. He received an average education and worked on his father's farm until September 1862 when he enlisted in the Union Army. He was assigned to the Department of the Gulf, After the war, he was elected to the Massachusetts legislature and served one term. He married Hannah W. Comer on October 4, 1865, and had 5 children. He then formed a granary business with his brother, Martin W. Stratton (1833–?) called Stratton Bros. In the fall of 1878, he moved to Reading, Kansas where he lived until his death in 1923 at age 82.
