= The Vacant Chair =

American Civil War poem

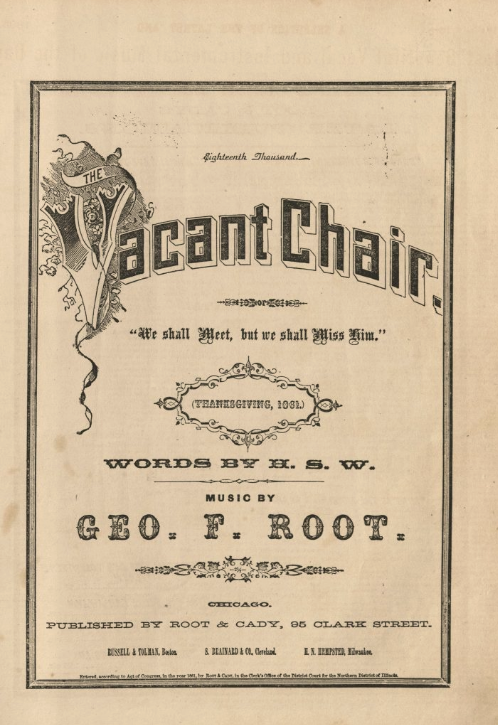
Cover of music to The Vacant Chair

"The Vacant Chair" is a poem that was written following the death of John William Grout (July 25, 1843 – October 21, 1861). Grout was a soldier killed in the American Civil War during the Battle of Ball's Bluff. The poem, written by Henry S. Washburn was put to music by George Frederick Root and became a popular song of the post-Civil War era.

== John William Grout ==
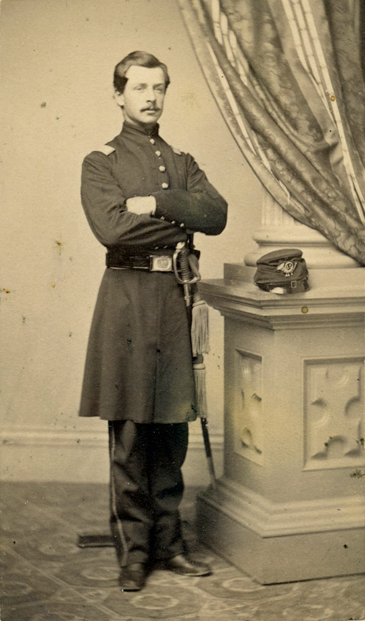
John William Grout

John William Grout was born to Jonathan and Mary Jane Grout on July 25, 1843, at Worcester, Massachusetts. He attended the military academy there.

He served as a 2nd lieutenant of Company D, 15th Massachusetts Infantry and was killed at the age of eighteen in the Battle of Ball’s Bluff on October 21, 1861. Grout's body was recovered on November 5, 1861, after being washed 35 miles (56 km) back to Washington, D.C. His remains were identified by the name written on his clothing.

== Poem ==
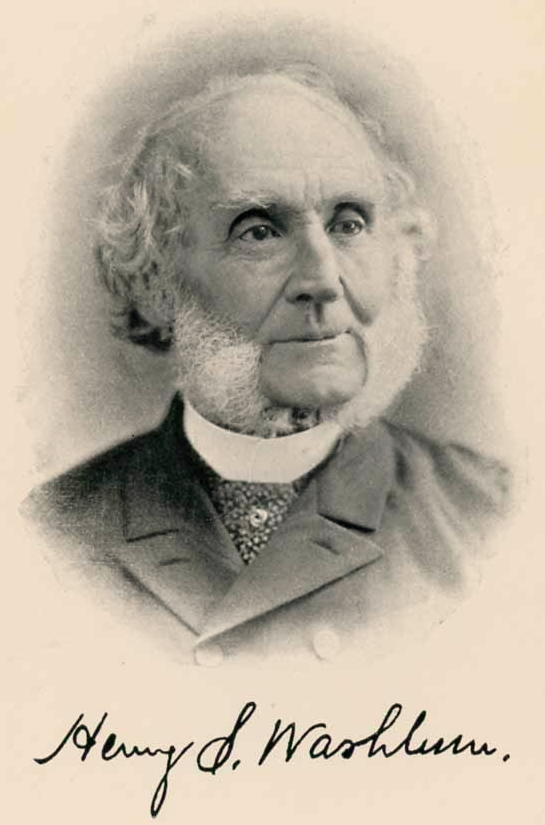
Henry S. Washburn

Upon hearing of Grout's death, Henry Stevenson Washburn, a family friend, wrote "The Vacant Chair" in late 1861, and it was first published in the Worcester Spy, attributed to "H. S. W." It is an allegory that describes the pain suffered by the family of those killed in war during the season surrounding Thanksgiving. The poem was turned into a song by George Frederick Root while living in Chicago without consulting Washburn—the poem was not copyrighted. The song was released in 1862 and became very popular in the South and North. Root is also known for such Civil War era songs as "The Battle Cry of Freedom" and "Tramp! Tramp! Tramp!."

== See also ==
- Life's Railway to Heaven
- Eliza R. Snow ("Truth Reflects upon Our Senses")

== Bibliography ==
- The New England magazine. New England Magazine Co. 1887.
- Browne, C. A. (1960). The story of our national ballads. New York, Crowell.
