= Goose Creek (Potomac River tributary) =

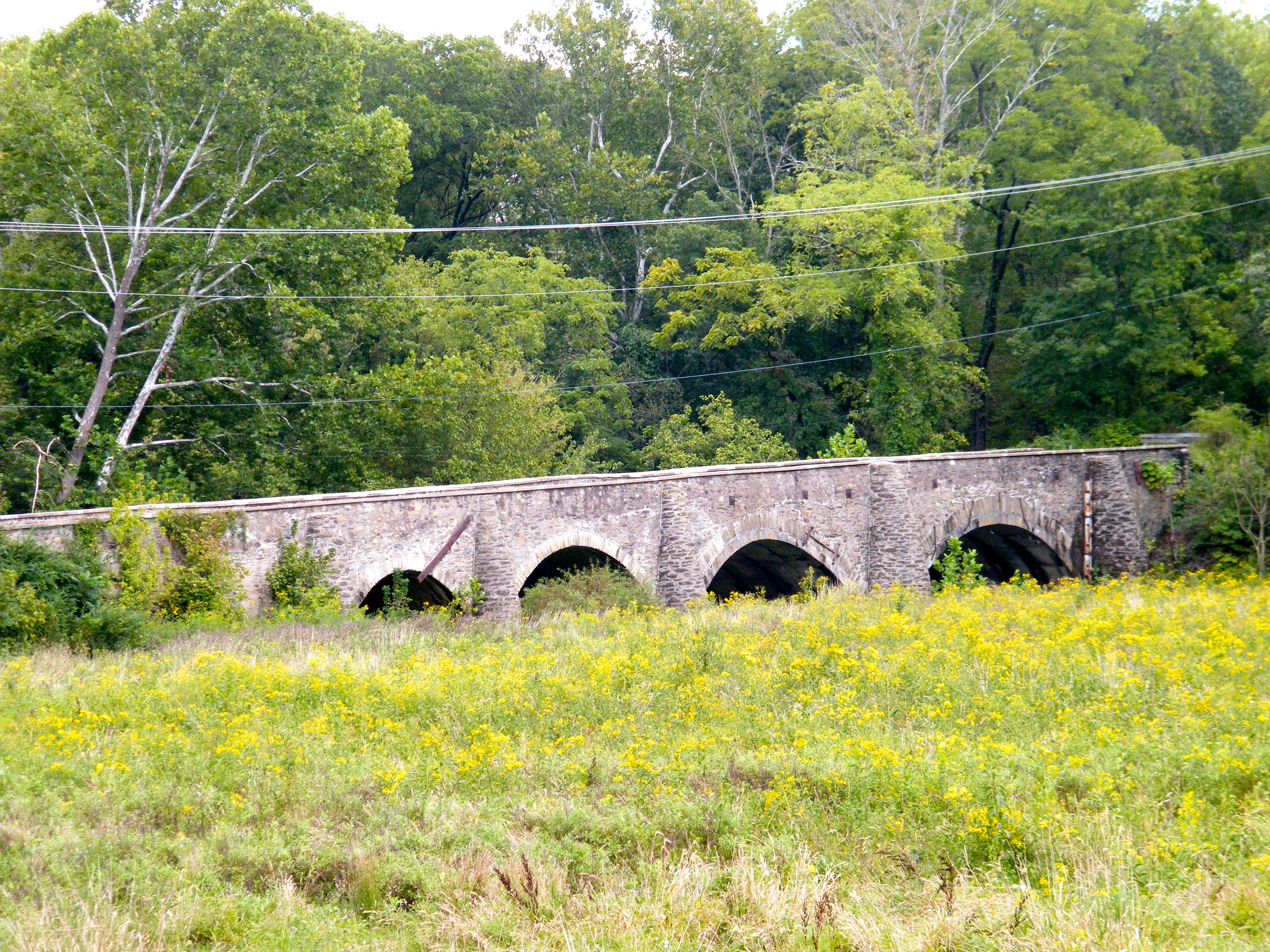
- Goose Creek Bridge

Location
- Country: United States
- State: Virginia
- Region: Loudoun County, Fauquier County

Physical characteristics
- Source
  - location: Linden
  - coordinates: 38.9148335°N 78.0702756°W
  - elevation: 1,040 ft (320 m)
- Mouth: Potomac River
  - location: Leesburg
  - coordinates: 39.1012177°N 77.4772109°W
  - elevation: 187 ft (57 m)
- Length: 55 mi (89 km)

Goose Creek is a 53.9-mile-long (86.7 km) tributary of the Potomac River in Fauquier and Loudoun Counties in Northern Virginia. It comprises the principal drainage system for the Loudoun Valley.

== Course ==
Goose Creek rises somewhere near Linden in the Manassas Gap. The creek initially flows eastward down the mountain, falling 600 feet (180 m) in its first 10 miles (16 km). Once in Loudoun, the creek continues in a northeastward direction for 15 miles (24 km) to the western foot of Catoctin Mountain, where it turns to the north briefly, before reaching the confluence of the North Fork and then turning to the east and cutting through a gap in the mountain. On the east side of the mountain, the creek again turns northeast, joining with the Little River. The creek flows for 15 miles (24 km) through central Loudoun County, reaching the Potomac just east of Leesburg, south of Harrison Island, and west of Selden Island. Goose Creek is partially dammed north of State Route 267. The dammed part is called Goose Creek Reservoir. The dam may be portaged through the woods on the eastern shore. There is also Beaverdam Reservoir, which comes from a source of water called Beaverdam Creek, as said creek branches off of Goose Creek.

=== North Fork ===
The North Fork of Goose Creek rises at the east end of Sleeter Lake in Round Hill and flows 13.3 miles (21.4 km) in a southeastward direction, joining with the main branch in the water gap of Catoctin Mountain.

== Conservation ==
The Goose Creek Association works to protect the watershed and landscape.

== Map of Goose Creek ==
In 1849, construction began on a system of locks and dams to render the creek navigable up to three large mills in the Loudoun Valley on the Little River, North Fork and main creek bed. Across the Potomac from the mouth of a creek, a special lock on the C&O Canal was constructed to allow canal boats from Goose Creek to enter the canal. By 1845, the Goose Creek and Little River Navigation Company canal system had been completed on Goose Creek to Ball's (Evergreen) Mill, 12 miles (19 km) upstream from the mouth. Due to financial concerns it was decided that the canal would not be built any further upstream. Though the lower portion of the canal saw significant usage, only one boat was ever known to have traveled the whole stretch, and by 1857 the canal was put out of business by the completion of the Alexandria, Loudoun and Hampshire Railroad to Leesburg. Most of the locks and dams were destroyed by the Union Army during the Civil War.

Goose Creek Bridge on the Ashby's Gap Turnpike was the site of a Civil War battle in the Loudoun Valley during the Gettysburg campaign in 1863. (See Battle of Upperville#Goose Creek for details.) The bridge was built between 1801 and 1803 and is the longest remaining stone turnpike bridge in the state of Virginia.

In The Water Dancer, a slave narrative style novel by Ta-Nehisi Coats, the Goose serves as both a water symbol and the geographic location of the fictionalized tobacco farm, Lockless, Virginia.

== Tributaries ==
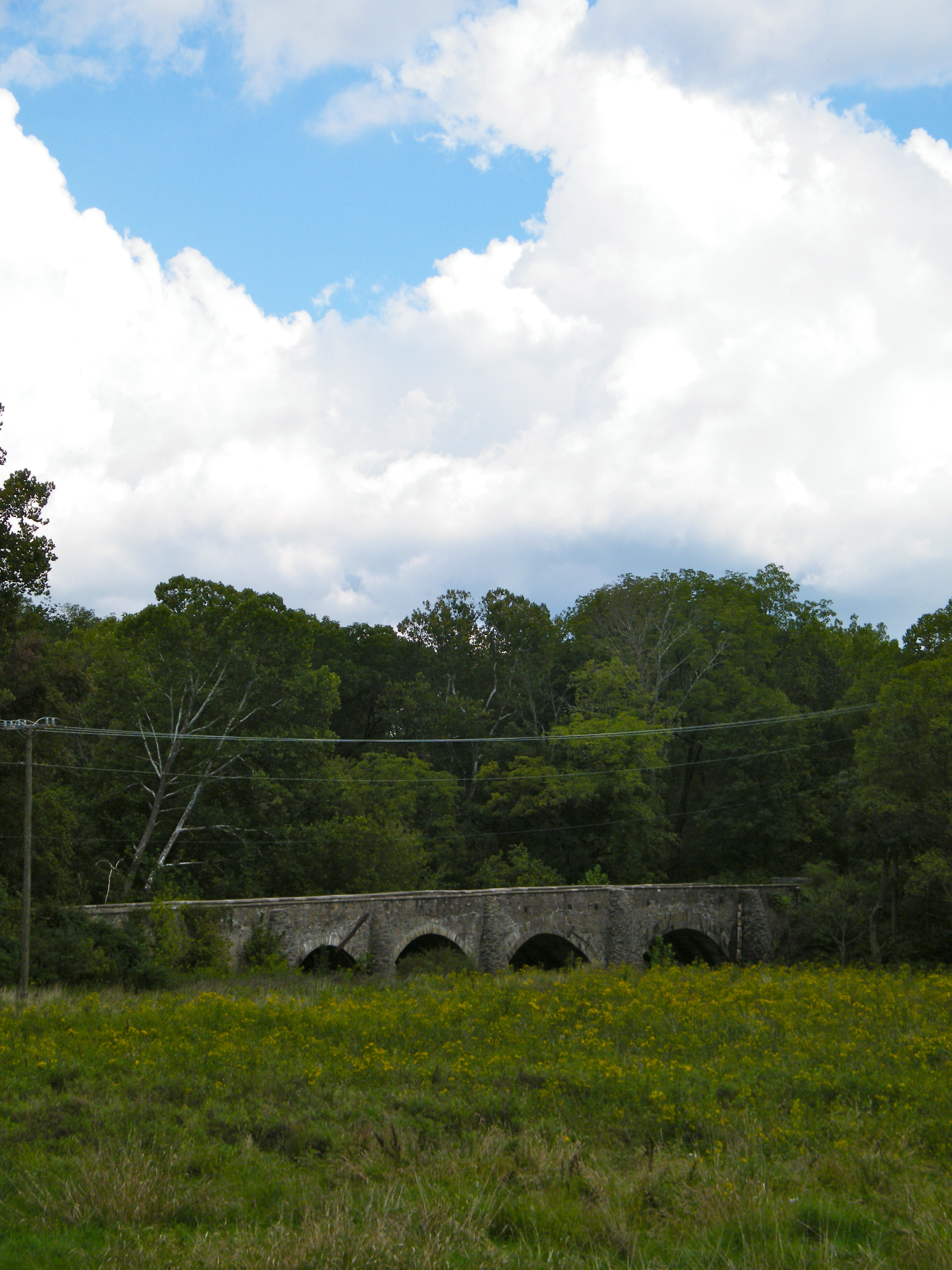
Goose Creek Bridge from the site of the battle

Tributaries are listed in order from the source of Goose Creek to its mouth.

- Mitchell's Branch
- Bolling Branch
- Gap Run
- Panther Skin Creek
- Cromwell's Run
- Wancopin Creek
- North Fork Goose Creek
  - Jacks' Run
  - Crooked Run
  - Beaverdam Creek
- Big Branch
- Little River
- Tan Branch
- Black Branch
- Beaver Dam Creek
- Sycolin Creek
- Tuscarora Creek
  - Dry Mill Branch
- Cattail Branch

== Variant names ==
According to the Geographic Names Information System, Goose Creek has been known by the following names throughout its history:

- Cokongoloto
- Cokongoloto Anglice
- Goes Creek
- Goes Flug
- Gohongarestaw
- Gooscreek
- Goose River
- Lee's Creek
- Tiber River

== See also ==
- List of rivers of Virginia
