= John W. Kimball =

American politician (1828 – 1910)

John White Kimball
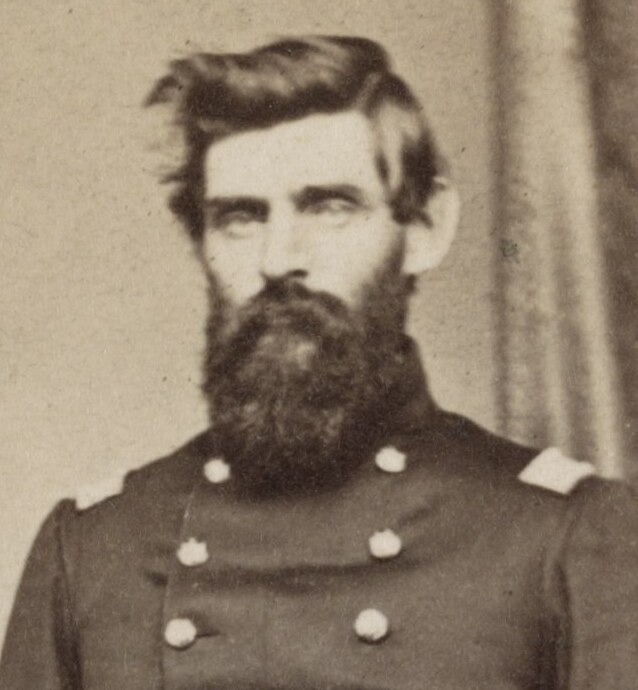
- Portrait of Kimball, c. 1861–1865

Massachusetts Auditor
- In office 1892–1901

Massachusetts House of Representatives Worcester District
- In office 1889–1891

Massachusetts House of Representatives Worcester District
- In office 1872–1872

Tax Collector of Fitchburg, Massachusetts
- In office 1864–1865

Massachusetts House of Representatives Worcester District
- In office 1864–1865

Personal details
- Born: February 27, 1828 Fitchburg, Massachusetts
- Died: July 15, 1910 (aged 82) Fitchburg, Massachusetts
- Party: Republican
- Spouse: Almira M. Lesure

Military service
- Allegiance: United States of America
- Branch/service: United States Army
- Years of service: 1846–1878
- Rank: Colonel; Brevet Brigadier General
- Commands: Fitchburg Fusiliers, Massachusetts Militia; 15th Massachusetts Infantry; 53rd Massachusetts Infantry; 57th Massachusetts Infantry
- Battles/wars: American Civil War: Second Battle of Bull Run; Battle of South Mountain; Battle of Antietam; Siege of Port Hudson; Siege of Petersburg

John White Kimball (February 27, 1828 – July 15, 1910) was an American soldier and politician who served as Massachusetts Auditor.

== Biography ==
Kimball was born in Fitchburg, Massachusetts, on February 27, 1828, to Alpheus Kimball, (1792–1859) and Harriet Stone, (1790–1888). Before the American Civil War, Kimball was a scythe manufacturer.

Kimball served as lieutenant colonel of the 15th Massachusetts Infantry Regiment and colonel of the 53rd Massachusetts Infantry Regiment. He was mustered out of the United States Volunteers on September 2, 1863. On December 3, 1867, President Andrew Johnson nominated Kimball for the award of the honorary grade of brevet brigadier general, United States Volunteers, to rank from March 13, 1865, for gallant and distinguished services in the field during the war, The U.S. Senate confirmed the award on February 14, 1868.

Kimball was Massachusetts State Auditor between 1891 and 1901. After the war, he was also United States Pension Agent, postmaster and a legislator.

Kimball died on July 15, 1910, aged 82, in Fitchburg, Massachusetts.

== See also ==
- 1872 Massachusetts legislature
- List of American Civil War brevet generals (Union)
- List of Massachusetts generals in the American Civil War

== Footnotes ==
Political offices
Preceded by William T. D. Trefry	Massachusetts Auditor; 1892 – 1901	Succeeded by Henry E. Turner
