= Little River (Goose Creek tributary) =

Location
- Country: United States
- State: Virginia
- Region: Loudoun County, Fauquier County

Physical characteristics
- Source
  - location: Marshall
  - coordinates: 38.8815016°N 77.8080498°W
- Mouth: Goose Creek (Potomac River tributary)
  - location: Aldie
  - coordinates: 39.0209419°N 77.6013811°W
  - elevation: 259 ft (79 m)
- Length: 23.4 mi (37.7 km)

Basin features
- River system: Goose Creek

Little River is a 23.4-mile-long (37.7 km) tributary stream of Goose Creek in Fauquier and Loudoun counties in Northern Virginia. Via Goose Creek, it is a tributary of the Potomac River.

The stream rises to the east of Marshall in Fauquier County and flows northwards along the western base of the Bull Run Mountains to Aldie, where it passes between the Bull Run Mountains and Catoctin Mountain. It then flows northward along the eastern slope of the latter mountain, joining Goose Creek east of Oatlands.

The Little River Turnpike (present-day U.S. Route 50/State Route 236) derives its name from the stream, as its western terminus was at the Little River in Aldie where it intersected the Ashby's Gap Turnpike and Snickersville Turnpike.

== See also ==
- List of rivers of Virginia
