= 53rd Massachusetts Infantry Regiment =

53rd Regiment Massachusetts Volunteer Infantry
- Massachusetts state flag
- Active: 17 October 1862 – 2 September 1863
- Country: United States
- Allegiance: Union
- Branch: Infantry
- Engagements: American Civil War

Commanders
- Notable commanders: Col. John W. Kimball

The 53rd Massachusetts Volunteer Infantry was an infantry regiment recruited in Massachusetts for service in the American Civil War. The volunteers, mostly farmers, predominantly hailed from north-central Massachusetts.

== Service ==
The Fifty-third Regiment was in the Department of the Gulf. It arrived at New Orleans, Louisiana, 30 January 1863, after a stormy passage. It encamped at Carrollton, reporting to Brigadier General Emory, and attached to the Third Brigade, Third Division. It was employed for six weeks in improving the drill and discipline of the regiment.

== War history ==
=== 1863 ===
==== 6 March ====
On 6 March, the Fifty-third was ordered to Baton Rouge and, on the 12th, was sent on a reconnaissance up the river, where it encountered, and drove in, the enemy's pickets. On the 13th, it marched with the division in the expedition to Port Hudson; but arriving after the object of the expedition was accomplished, it returned to Baton Rouge. On 1 April it was ordered to Algiers with the rest of the division, and, on the 9th, took passage for Brashear City, to join in the movement through the Teche country, which began 11 April. The enemy having been encountered at Pattersonville on the 13th, the Fifty-third was engaged in supporting a battery, and skirmishing towards the fortifications, when it was under fire of musketry and shell for five hours. The flag of the Fifty-third was the first to be placed upon the ramparts of Fort Brisland.

The regiment lost in this action one officer and thirteen privates, killed and wounded. But eight companies were engaged, two being on detached service.

==== 15 March ====
On the 15th, it marched with the division in pursuit of the retreating enemy, with an occasional skirmish, and reached Opelousas on the 20th, where it remained a fortnight, employed in drill and picket duty.

==== 24 May ====
The army having moved towards Port Hudson, the Fifty-third was detailed as guard for the engineer corps, and led the column. Encountering the enemy's skirmishers, the regiment was immediately moved forward; three companies, thrown out as skirmishers, soon became engaged with the enemy, and succeeded in driving them back, so that the engineer corps could proceed in its labours.

==== 27 May ====
The day of the general attack upon Port Hudson, the regiment was ordered forward, and was soon under fire of shot and shell. It moved to the front to support a battery, and to the front line of skirmishers. By this time, it had lost thirty killed and wounded.

==== 28 May ====
It joined the brigade, and remained until 1 June, engaged in picket duty, and fortifying the position; it was then ordered to occupy rifle pits at the front, and sustained a loss of five men, killed and wounded.

==== 5 June ====
It marched as a part of the expedition to Clinton, which occupied four days, and resulted in driving the enemy from that locality. On the 13th it was ordered to join in the assault upon the fortifications at Port Hudson. This assault cost the regiment heavily. Of the three hundred officers and men (being but eight companies) who were sent in, seven officers and seventy-nine men were killed and wounded.

==== 19 June ====
The Fifty-third was ordered to the front in support of a battery, where it remained till the surrender of Port Hudson, 9 July. It was then ordered on picket duty five miles from Port Hudson, when it marched with the brigade to Baton Rouge. On the 15th it embarked for Donaldsonville and remained in camp, engaged in drill and picket duty until 2 August when it returned to Baton Rouge, and, on the 12th, was ordered to Massachusetts by way of Cairo, Illinois. It arrived at Cairo 19 August, and at Fitchburg, Massachusetts, the 24th, where, after a public reception, it was furloughed one week, and mustered out of service 2 September, by Captain I. R. Lawrence.

== Result ==
Died: 146; Killed: 18; Discharged: 54; Prisoners: 0; Deserted: 21

== See also ==
- List of Massachusetts Civil War units
- Massachusetts in the Civil War
