= Harrison Island (Maryland) =

Island in Montgomery County, Maryland

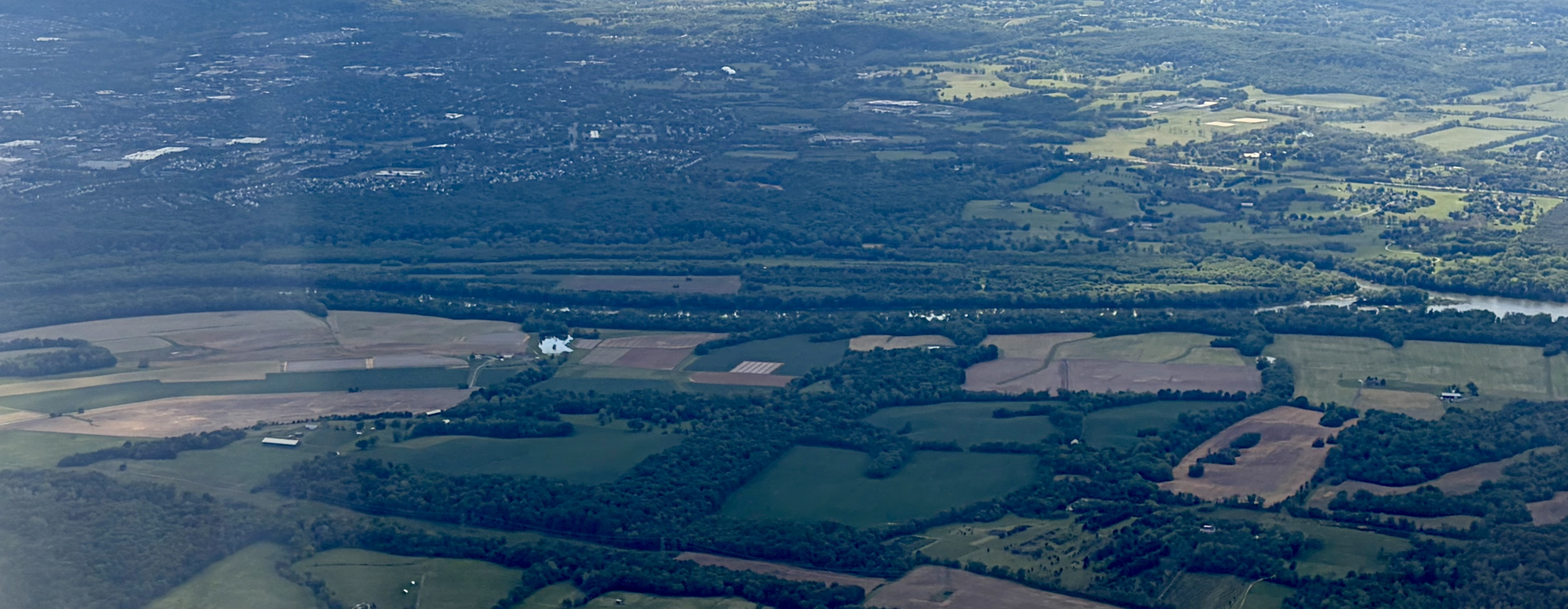
- Aerial view of Harrison Island from the east
- Interactive map of Harrison Island

Geography
- Location: Montgomery County, Maryland
- Coordinates: 39°08′07″N 77°31′21″W

Administration
- United States

Harrison Island is a private farming island in Montgomery County, Maryland, United States. It is located between the Potomac River on the Maryland side, and Ball's Bluff Battlefield and National Cemetery on the Virginia side, next to Leesburg, Virginia. The island dominates the view from the heights of Ball's Bluff Battlefield. Among the low, flood-prone islands of the lower Potomac River, Harrison Island is notable for having a permanent private residence visible near the center of the island. There are no bridges to the island. Currently the island is closed to the general public.
