= Florida Ship Canal Company =

The Florida Ship Canal Company was a company founded in 1883 with hopes to build a proposed Cross Florida Canal.

The company was incorporated February 26, 1883 under Florida state law chapter 3486. Its stated purpose was:

to survey, locate, construct, own, maintain, and operate and enjoy a Ship Canal and Telegraph Line, with all appropriate and necessary appurtenances across the peninsula of the State of Florida, which shall connect the waters of the Atlantic Ocean with the Gulf of Mexico, commencing at a point on the Atlantic coast at or between the bay and harbor at Fernandina and the bay and harbor of St. Augustine, thence by the most practicable and feasible route the said company may ascertain across said peninsula, terminating with the Gulf of Mexico at any point between Apalachee Bay and Tampa Bay and harbor, with the right to use and pass over any river, lake or other body of water on the route so selected for said canal, the same to be constructed with or without locks, as the company may determine.

A map of the route was to be filed in the office of the Florida Commissioner of Lands and Immigration within one year of the passage of the act.

The company was owned by: Townsend Cox, Wm. Fullerton, John H. Fry, L. M. Lawson, S. T. Meyer, Micheal Jacobs and David McAdam, of the City of New York; John C. Brown of Tennessee; Wm. Mahone, Wm. E. Cameron, A. W. Jones and V. D. Groner, of Virginia; John P. Jones, of Nevada; Benj. F Butler of Massachusetts; and W. H. Manning of Ohio.
