= United States Congressional Joint Committee on the Conduct of the War =

US Civil War committee

The Joint Committee on the Conduct of the War was a United States congressional committee started on December 9, 1861, and was dismissed in May 1865. The committee investigated the progress of the American Civil War against the Confederacy. Meetings were held in secret, but reports were issued from time to time.

It became a forum for Union generals who, finding themselves accused of failure, put the blame on others. The committee was dominated by Radical Republicans whose aggressive views often clashed with the strategies favored by President Abraham Lincoln.

== Agenda ==
The Joint Committee on the Conduct of the War was a United States Congressional investigating committee created to handle issues surrounding the American Civil War. It was established on December 9, 1861, following the Union defeat at the Battle of Ball's Bluff, at the instigation of Senator Zachariah T. Chandler. The committee continued until May 1865. Its purpose was to investigate such matters as illicit trade with the Confederate States, medical treatment of wounded soldiers, military contracts, and the causes of Union battle losses. The committee was also involved in supporting the war effort through various means, including endorsing emancipation of slaves, the use of black soldiers, and the appointment of generals known to be aggressive fighters. Chairman Benjamin Wade and key leaders were Radical Republicans, who wanted more aggressive war policies than those of Lincoln.

Union officers often found themselves in an uncomfortable position before the committee. Since it was a civil war, pitting neighbor against neighbor, the loyalty of a soldier to the Union was simple to question. Also, since Union forces had performed mostly badly against their Confederate counterparts early in the war, particularly in the Eastern Theater battles that held the attention of the newspapers and Washington politicians, an officer could easily be accused of being a traitor after he lost a battle or was slow to engage or pursue the enemy. The politically charged atmosphere was very difficult and distracting for career military officers. Officers who were not known Republicans felt the most pressure before the committee.

The committee held 272 meetings and received testimony, in Washington and other locations, often from military officers. Though the committee met and held hearings in secrecy, the testimony and its related exhibits were published at irregular intervals in the numerous committee reports of its investigations. The records include the original manuscripts of certain postwar reports that the committee received from general officers. There are also transcripts of testimony and accounting records regarding the military administration of Alexandria, Virginia.

One of the most colorful series of committee hearings followed the Battle of Gettysburg in 1863, when Union Maj. Gen. Daniel Sickles, a former Representative, accused Maj. Gen. George G. Meade of mismanaging the battle, planning to retreat from Gettysburg before his victory there, and failing to pursue and defeat Robert E. Lee's army as it retreated. It was mostly a self-serving effort on the part of Sickles, who was trying to deflect criticism from his own disastrous role in the battle. Bill Hyde notes that the committee's report on Gettysburg was edited by Wade in ways that were unfavorable to Meade, and the evidence was even distorted. The report was "a powerful propaganda weapon" (p. 381), but the committee's power had waned by the time that the final testimony, that of William T. Sherman, was taken on May 22, 1865.

After the end of the war that it was investigating, the committee ceased to exist after the last testimony, and its final reports were published shortly thereafter. The later Joint Committee on Reconstruction represented a similar attempt to check executive power by the Radical Republicans.

== Members ==
=== 37th Congress ===
The committee's original Senate members were selected by vice president Hannibal Hamlin. House members were selected by speaker Galusha Grow.

	Majority	Minority
Senate members	Benjamin Wade (R-OH), Chairman; Zachariah Chandler (R-MI)	Andrew Johnson (D-TN); Joseph A. Wright (D-IN)
House members	George W. Julian (R-IN); John Covode (R-PA); Daniel W. Gooch (R-MA)	Moses Odell (D-NY)

=== 38th Congress ===
In January 1864, committee chairman Wade introduced a resolution broadening the committee's powers to include the oversight of military contracts. Both the House and Senate passed similar resolutions by mid-January.

	Majority	Minority
Senate members	Benjamin Wade (R-OH), Chairman; Zachariah Chandler (R-MI)	Benjamin F. Harding (D-OR); Charles R. Buckalew (D-PA)
House members	George W. Julian (R-IN); Daniel W. Gooch (R-MA)	Moses Odell (D-NY); Benjamin F. Loan (UU-MO)

== Reports ==
The committee took testimony from witnesses, mostly Union Army officers, in private sessions often without a quorum of members. The committee had been active for over a year before its first report was published in 1863.

=== 1863 ===
The committee's first report was issued in three parts. Part 1 covered the Army of the Potomac. Part 2 covered the Union's 1861 Eastern Theater losses at First Bull Run and at Ball's Bluff. Part 3 covered the war's Western Theater.

=== 1864 ===
The 1864 report had two parts. The first presented reports and testimony taken involving the alleged Confederate mistreatment of United States Colored Troops soldiers after their surrender at Fort Pillow. The second part related to the condition of returned Union soldiers after their imprisonment in Confederate prisoner-of-war camps.

=== 1865 ===
The 1865 report was more comprehensive than those first two years. It covered a wide variety of issues: the Mine Crater incident during the Siege of Petersburg, the Fort Pillow episode, the military expeditions at Fort Fisher and up the Red River. Extensive testimony was taken on ordnance, contracts to supply ice for the war effort, turreted Monitor-class warships, and the massacre of friendly Cheyenne Indians at Sand Creek, Colorado.

=== 1866 ===
A two-volume supplement was published in 1866 to present reports of several witnesses: Major Generals Sherman, Thomas, Pope, Foster, Pleasanton, Hitchcock, Sheridan, and Brigadier General Ricketts.

== Legacy ==
Tap shows that Radical Republicans used the committee to challenge Lincoln's role as commander-in-chief. During the 37th and the 38th Congresses, it investigated every aspect of Union military operations, with special attention to finding the men who were guilty of military defeats. Its members assumed an inevitable Union victory and considered failure to indicate evil motivations or personal failures. They were skeptical of military science and, especially, the graduates of the United States Military Academy at West Point, many alumni of which were leaders of the enemy army. The committee much preferred political generals with a known political record. Some members suggested that West Pointers who engaged in strategic maneuvers were cowardly or even disloyal. It ended up endorsing incompetent but politically loyal generals. Tap finds that "the committee's investigations, its leaks to the press, and its use of secret testimony to discredit generals such as McClellan certainly were instrumental in creating hostility between the army's West Point officers and the nation's civilian leaders."

Finally, because of its collective ignorance of military science and preference for the heroic saber charge, "the committee tended to reinforce the unrealistic and simplistic notions of warfare that prevailed in the popular mind," writes Tap.

The Committee on the Conduct of the War is considered to be among the harshest congressional investigating committees in history; Gershman says that it conducted witch-hunts, rather than fair inquiries.

Senator Harry S. Truman cited the committee's style as an example of what not to follow when he led the Truman Committee, which investigated military appropriations during World War II. Truman stated that he did not want to second-guess war strategy. His committee succeeded in demonstrating government waste and inefficiency to assist the war effort.

== Sources ==
- Hyde, Bill. The Union Generals Speak: The Meade Hearings on the Battle of Gettysburg. Louisiana State University Press, 2003, ISBN 978-0-8071-2581-6.
- Reid, Brian Holden, "Historians and the Joint Committee on the Conduct of the War," Civil War History 38 (1992): 319–41.
- Tap, Bruce (1998). Over Lincoln's Shoulder: The Committee on the Conduct of the War. Lawrence, Kansas: University Press of Kansas. ISBN 0-7006-0871-0.
- Tap, Bruce, "Amateurs at War: Abraham Lincoln and the Committee on the Conduct of the War" in Journal of the Abraham Lincoln Association v 23#2 (2002), online
- Tap, Bruce. "Inevitability, masculinity, and the American military tradition: the committee on the conduct of the war investigates the American Civil War," American 19th century History, July 2004, Vol. 5 Issue 2, pp 19–46
- Trefousse, Hans L., The Radical Republicans: Lincoln's Vanguard for Racial Justice (1969)
- Trefousse, Hans L., "The Joint Committee on the Conduct of the War: A Reappraisal," Civil War History 10 (1964): 5–19.
- Williams, T. Harry, Lincoln and the Radicals (Madison: University of Wisconsin Press, 1941).
