= 15th Massachusetts Infantry Regiment =

American Civil War unit

15th Regiment Massachusetts Volunteer Infantry
- Active: July 12, 1861 – July 26, 1864
- Country: United States
- Allegiance: Union
- Branch: United States Army
- Type: Infantry
- Size: 1,701
- Part of: 1st Brigade, 2nd Division (Gibbon's), II Corps, Army of the Potomac
- Engagements: Battle of Ball's Bluff; Battle of Malvern Hill; Battle of Antietam; Battle of Fredericksburg; Mud March; Battle of Gettysburg; Battle of the Wilderness; Battle of Spotsylvania Court House; Battle of Cold Harbor; Siege of Petersburg

Commanders
- Notable commanders: Col. Charles Devens; Lt. Col. John W. Kimball

Insignia
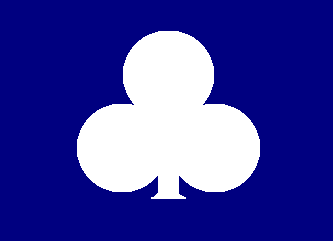
- II Corps badge (2nd Division)

The 15th Massachusetts Volunteer Infantry Regiment was an infantry regiment that served from the State of Massachusetts during the American Civil War from 1861 to 1864. A part of the II Corps of the Army of the Potomac, the regiment was engaged in many battles from Ball's Bluff to Petersburg, and suffered the tenth highest fatality rate amongst Federal regiments. The regiment was composed almost entirely of men from Worcester County, and was mustered in on July 12, 1861.

== Brigade, Divisional and Corps attachments ==
Attached to Gorman's Brigade, Stone's (Sedgwick's) Division, Army of the Potomac, to March, 1862. 1st Brigade, 2nd Division, 2nd Army Corps, Army of the Potomac, to July, 1864

== History ==
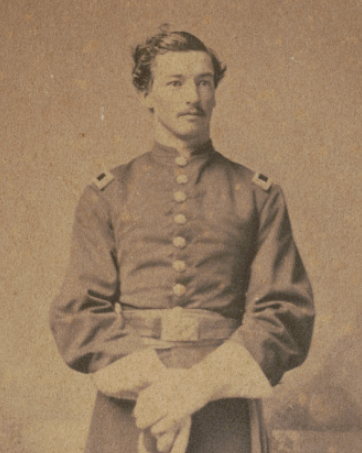
Lieutenant Leroy D. Ball of the 15th Massachusetts, later transferred to the 82nd US Colored Infantry.

The regiment was mustered into Federal service on July 12, 1861, and left for the seat of war, arriving along the Potomac on August 25. On October 21, it was engaged with the heaviest loss among all Federal regiments at the Battle of Ball's Bluff. In the spring of 1862, it was made a part of the II Corps of the Army of the Potomac and accompanied it during the Peninsular Campaign, being engaged at the Battles of Seven Pines, Savage's Station, and Glendale with modest losses. In April 1862, the 1st Company Massachusetts Sharpshooters was attached to the regiment, serving with it until the spring of 1863. Spending most of the summer at Harrison's Landing, it departed in August just in time to miss the Battle of Second Bull Run. The regiment then embarked upon the Maryland Campaign, where it was savagely flanked by the Confederates at the Battle of Antietam, losing over 50% of its 600 men. During the Battle of Fredericksburg, it was kept out of the main assault on Marye's Heights and suffered relatively few losses. The Battle of Gettysburg found the regiment engaged against the assaults of the Army of Northern Virginia on July 2 and 3, 1863, with heavy loss. By 1864, the regiment's strength had dwindled, but it still faced rigorous campaigning with action at The Battle of the Wilderness, Spotsylvania, Cold Harbor, and the Siege of Petersburg. By June 22, the regiment could field only 75 officers and men. This small group was captured en masse that day when they were outflanked by a Confederate force on the Jerusalem Plank Road. The survivors and parolees mustered out of Federal service on July 26, 1864, with its recruits and re-enlistees being transferred to the 20th Massachusetts Volunteer Infantry.

== Casualties ==
During the war, the 15th Massachusetts Regiment sustained the 10th-highest number of men killed or fatally wounded in action among all 1,200 Federal regiments. Its losses at several engagements are as follows:

- Ball's Bluff, Va., October 21, 1861: 40 killed or fatally wounded, 70 wounded, 202 captured (312 out of 650 engaged)
- Antietam, Md., September 17, 1862: 104 killed or fatally wounded, 206 wounded, 14 captured (324 of 600 engaged)
- Gettysburg, Pa., July 2–3, 1863: 37 killed or fatally wounded, 94 wounded, 24 captured (155 out of 239 engaged)
- Wilderness, Va., May 5–6, 1864: 16 killed or fatally wounded, 51 wounded, 17 captured (of whom 6 died in prison)

In sum, 14 officers and 227 enlisted men were killed or fatally wounded during the course of the war.

== Post Civil war Service ==
Company B of the 15th Massachusetts Infantry during the Civil War was a pre war milita formation the "Fitchburg Fusiliers" formed in 1817 from Fitchburg Massachusetts. The Fitchburg Fusiliers became Company B of the 6th Massachusetts Infantry MVM in the war of 1898 In turn the 6th Massachusetts Infantry became part of the 181st US Infantry Regiment

== See also ==
- List of Massachusetts Civil War units
- Massachusetts in the Civil War
