= 2nd Maine Infantry Regiment =

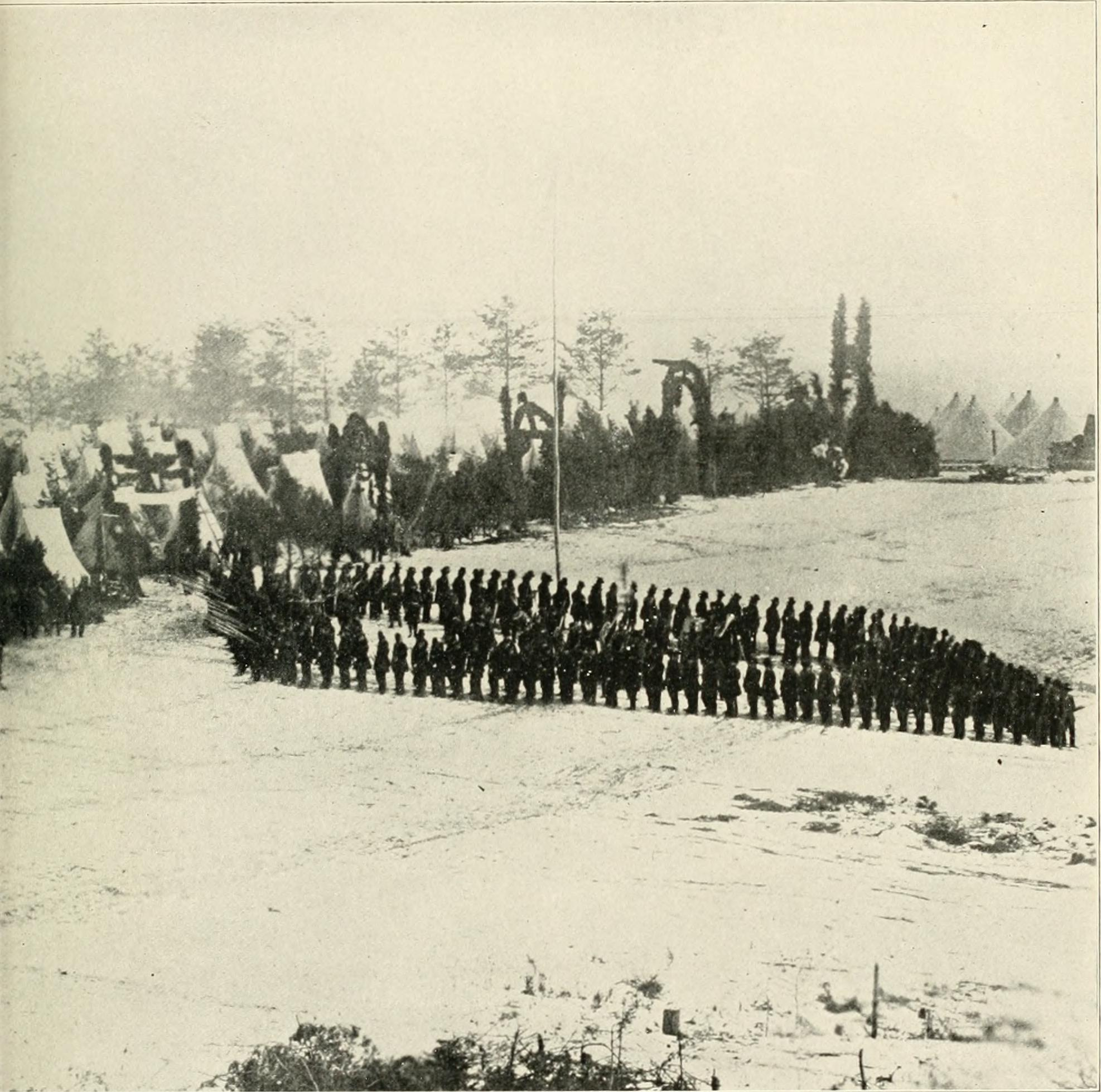
- 2nd Maine Infantry at Camp Jameson, 1861
- Active: May 28, 1861, to June 9, 1863
- Country: United States
- Allegiance: Union
- Branch: United States Army
- Type: Infantry
- Engagements: First Battle of Bull Run; Peninsula Campaign; Second Battle of Bull Run; Battle of Antietam; Battle of Chancellorsville

Commanders
- Colonel: Charles D. Jameson
- Lt. Col.: Charles W. Roberts

The 2nd Maine Infantry Regiment (also known as the Second Maine Regiment, Second Maine Infantry, or The Bangor Regiment) was a Union Army unit during the American Civil War. It was mustered in Bangor, Maine, for two years' service on May 28, 1861, and mustered out in the same place on June 9, 1863.

Five of the ten companies of the regiment were raised in Bangor, including a Gymnasium Company, the Grattan Guards, and a company of Ex-Tigers (firemen). Other companies were from Castine, Milo, and Old Town.

The 2nd Maine was the first Civil War regiment to march out of the state, and was greeted with accolades by civilians as it made its way to Washington, D.C. It engaged in "eleven bloody and hard-fought battles" including the First Battle of Bull Run, where it was the last regiment to leave the field, and Fredericksburg, where it took its greatest number of casualties.

When the regiment was mustered out in Bangor, huge crowds gathered to celebrate its return on Broadway, and a ceremony was held at Norumbega Hall downtown. Those soldiers who had enlisted for three years, rather than two, were transferred to the 20th Maine Volunteer Infantry Regiment under protest.

== History ==
Numbered the second, this was in fact the first regiment to leave the state for the front. It was raised within the limits of the first militia division of the state and was rendezvoused at Bangor. Companies A, B, C, D and I belonged to Col. Jameson's old command, and were reorganized for service in this regiment. The others were new companies. It completed its organization and left the state May 14, 1861. Like the 1st, it originally enlisted for three months, but on May 28, was mustered into the United States service for two years. The 2nd, during its two years' term of service, saw much hard service and participated in eleven bloody and hard-fought battles, besides numerous skirmishes and scouting expeditions. It never received a word of censure and invariably distinguished itself. A list of the important battles in which it was engaged includes the First and Second Bull Run, Hall's Hill, Yorktown, Hanover Court House, Gaines' Mill, Malvern Hill, Antietam, Fredericksburg and Chancellorsville. The magnificent fighting record of the 2nd was largely due to the efficiency of its officers. It showed the stuff it was made of in its first battle at Bull Run. Col. Keyes, who commanded the brigade which included the 2nd Me., says in his official report of the battle: "The gallantry with which the 2nd regiment of Maine volunteers charged up the hill upon the enemy's artillery and infantry, was never in my opinion surpassed." Col. Jameson, the first volunteer and the first colonel in the field from Maine, was commissioned brigadier-general of volunteers for gallantry displayed in this, his first battle. Lieut.-Col. Roberts succeeded to the command of the regiment, and after his resignation and honorable discharge, Jan. 10, 1863, Lieut.-Col. Varney was promoted to the colonelcy of the regiment, and Maj. Sargent was commissioned lieutenant-colonel, the majorship being left vacant on account of the reduced condition of the regiment. On July 18, 1862, Capt. Chaplin, who had succeeded Varney in that command, was discharged to enable him to accept the command of the 18th Me., then being raised, and Capt. Sargent of Co. G was promoted to fill the vacancy. Some of the men became discontented three months after leaving the state from seeing three months' men from other states returning home. Sixty-six claimed their time had expired, became insubordinate, and were sentenced to Tortugas; but this sentence was later commuted to a transfer to the 2nd N. Y., where they served about a year and then returned and served faithfully with the regiment for the remainder of the term. Co. I became greatly reduced in numbers in Oct., 1861, and the officers having resigned, it was disbanded. Capt. Daniel White of Bangor raised a new company which took its place in December of that year. On July 28, 1862, the effective strength of the 2nd became reduced to 257 rifles and came out of the battle of Second Bull Run with only 137 men able to carry arms. This is most convincing evidence of the trying service to which they were subjected. The regiment was mustered out June 4, and 9, 1863. In all 1,228 men were mustered in, of whom 275 returned and were mustered out; 120 were mustered in for three years and transferred to the 20th Maine.

== Prominent members ==
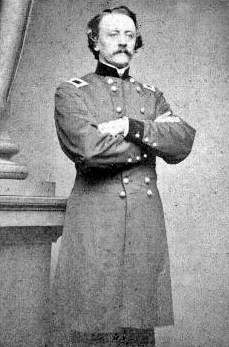
Charles Davis Jameson, first commander of the 2nd Maine

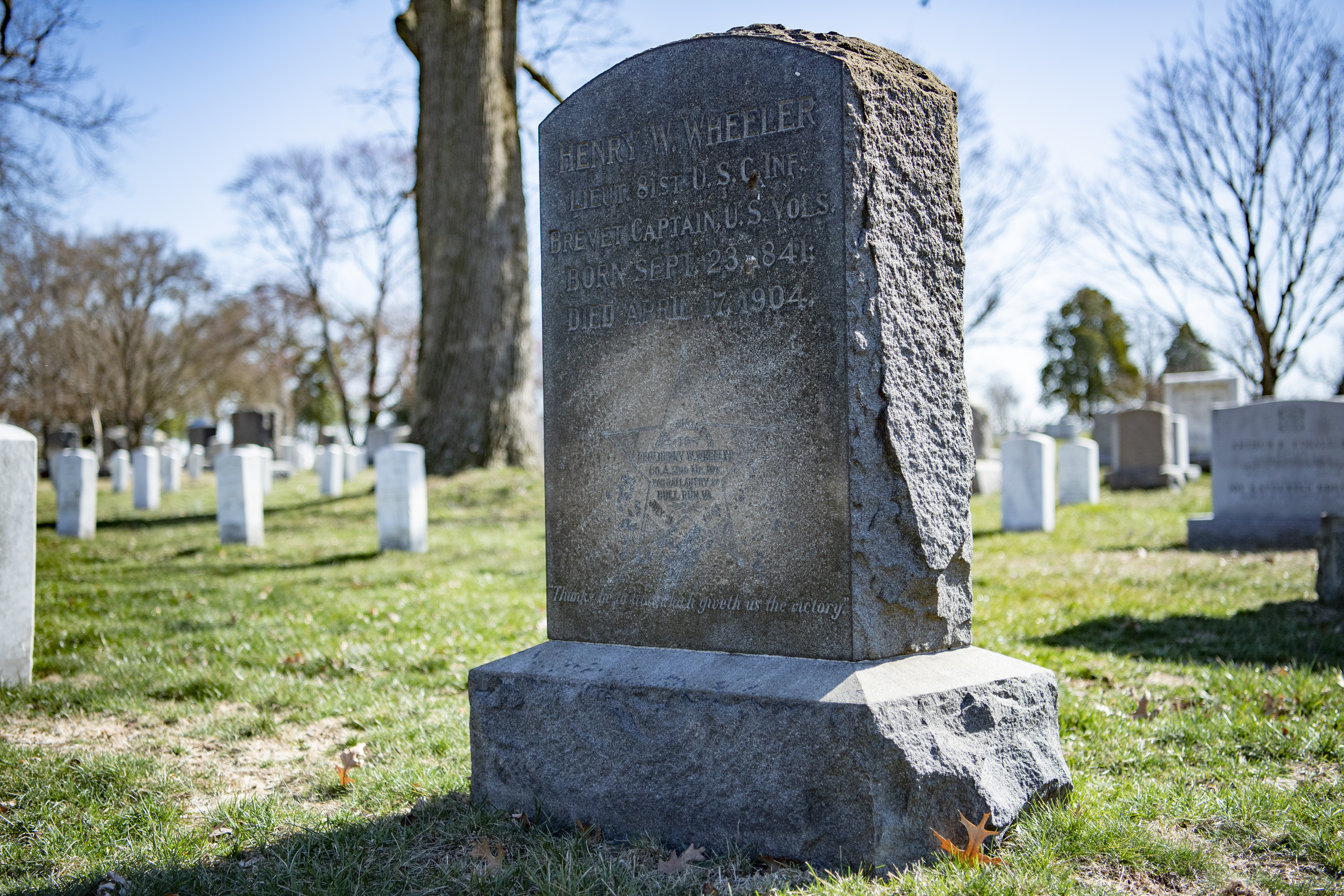
Grave of Henry W. Wheeler, Medal of Honor recipient for his actions in the First Battle of Bull Run, at Arlington National Cemetery

The first commander of the 2nd Maine was Col. Charles Davis Jameson, a lumber merchant from Old Town, who later became a brigadier general, was wounded in battle, and died of camp fever. Jameson's successor was Col. Charles W. Roberts of Bangor, who had a horse shot out from under him at the Second Battle of Bull Run. The last commander was Col. George Varney. The Ex-Tigers were led by Capt. Daniel Sargent of Brewer, Maine, who would be promoted to lieutenant colonel and second in command under Varney.

Augustus Choate Hamlin of Bangor, nephew of Vice President Hannibal Hamlin, was the regiment's Assistant Surgeon, and later Surgeon. After the war, he wrote books about Andersonville Prison and the Battle of Chancellorsville.

Quartermaster Sergeant Luther H. Peirce became a wealthy Bangor lumber merchant and funded a monument to the 2nd Maine at Mount Hope Cemetery.

Private J. Sumner Rogers later served as an officer and went on to found Michigan Military Academy.

== Casualties ==
The regiment lost 69 men killed in action or died of wounds received in battle and an additional 70 men died of disease and 15 men lost through mutiny.

According to the History of Penobscot County, Maine, the regiment suffered 47 killed or wounded in the First Battle of Bull Run and over 100 missing in action (presumably including those taken prisoner).

== Flags ==
Regiment was known to carry 3 flags during the War. One of the more notable ones was a National flag dubbed the "California Flag." The banner costed $1,200, with the funds coming from Mainers living in San Francisco. The flag was presented by the ladies of Bangor to the regiment on July 20th of 1861, just outside of Centreville. One side of the canton was an American Eagle with 34 stars above him, they were both painted in gold. While on the backside was and illustration of Libertas next to the coat of arms of Maine and California, above the painting was the words "California to Maine." Below the illustration was a scroll bearing the National motto "E Pluribus Unum."

The flag was carried by W. J. Deane who would died at the First Battle of Bull Run, 12 hours after the banner was presented. In 1886, Veterans of the unit got together in Portland to form a honor guard for the flag. They later sailed to San Francisco to meet up with others Veterans living in that city.

== See also ==
- List of Maine Civil War units
- Maine in the American Civil War
