= 3rd Maine Light Artillery Battery =

- Active: December 11, 1861, to June 17, 1865
- Country: United States
- Allegiance: Union
- Branch: Artillery
- Engagements: Second Battle of Bull Run; Siege of Petersburg; Battle of the Crater

3rd Maine Light Artillery Battery was an artillery battery that served in the Union Army during the American Civil War.

== Service ==
The 3rd Maine Battery was organized in Augusta, Maine and mustered in for three years' service on December 11, 1861.

The battery was assigned to duty as Pontooneers, McDowell's Department of the Rappahannock, April to June 1862. Pontooneers, III Corps, Army of Virginia, to September 1862. 1st Brigade, Haskins' Division, Defenses of Washington, to February 1863. Battery assigned to 1st Maine Heavy Artillery as Company M, March 28, 1863. Attached to Haskins' Division, XXII Corps, to February 1864. Detached from 1st Maine Heavy Artillery and reorganized as 3rd Maine Battery February 23, 1864. Attached to Camp Barry, Defenses of Washington, XXII Corps, April to July 1864. Artillery, 3rd Division, IX Corps, Army of the Potomac, to August 1864. Artillery Reserve, Army of the Potomac, to June 1865.

The 3rd Maine Battery mustered out of service June 17, 1865, at Augusta, Maine.

== Detailed service ==
Duty at Augusta until March 19, 1862, and at Portland, Me., until April 1. Moved to Washington, D.C., April 1–8. Camp at Capitol Hill until April 14. Duty with Pontoon Train at Falmouth, Va., Washington. D.C., and at Alexandria, Va., April to November 1862. Pope's Campaign in northern Virginia August 16-September 2. Second Battle of Bull Run August 30. At Fort Lincoln, Defenses of Washington, until March 28, 1863, and in the Defenses with 1st Maine Heavy Artillery until January 1864. On veteran furlough January and February. Moved to Camp Barry March 25, and duty there until July 5. Moved to City Point, then to Petersburg front July 5–9. Siege of Petersburg July 9-October 25. Moved to City Point, Va., October 25, and duty in the defenses at that point until May 3, 1865. Moved to Washington, D.C., May 3–17. At Fairfax Seminary until June 2. Ordered to Augusta, Maine.

During the siege of Petersburg, the battery participated in the infamous effort to mine and then blow up the Confederate defenses. This was an effort to jumpstart operations to end the siege and take Petersburg. The effort resulted in a crater caused by the explosion and the soldiers weren't prepared with ladders or other equipment to take advantage of the gap in the lines. The Confederates overcame disorder caused by the explosion and repulsed the Union soldiers with significant casualties.

== Casualties ==
The battery lost a total of 17 enlisted men during service; 3 enlisted men killed or mortally wounded, 14 enlisted men died of disease.

== Commanders ==
- Captain Ezekiel R. Mayo

== See also ==
- List of Maine Civil War units
- Maine in the American Civil War
