= 4th Maine Light Artillery Battery =

- Active: December 21, 1861, to June 17, 1865
- Country: United States
- Allegiance: Union
- Branch: Artillery
- Engagements: Battle of Cedar Mountain; Battle of Groveton; Second Battle of Bull Run; Battle of Antietam; Bristoe Campaign; Mine Run Campaign; Overland Campaign; Battle of the Wilderness; Battle of Spotsylvania Court House; Battle of Totopotomoy Creek; Battle of Cold Harbor; Siege of Petersburg; Battle of the Crater; Battle of Sayler's Creek; Battle of Appomattox Court House

4th Maine Light Artillery Battery was an artillery battery that served in the Union Army during the American Civil War.

== Service ==
The 4th Maine Battery was organized in Augusta, Maine and mustered in for three years' service on December 21, 1861.

The battery was attached to 2nd Division, II Corps, Army of Virginia, to September 1862. Artillery, 3rd Division, III Corps, Army of the Potomac, to May 1863. Artillery Brigade, III Corps, to September 1863. Artillery, 2nd Division, III Corps, to April 1864. Artillery Brigade, VI Corps, to August 1864. Artillery Reserve, Army of the Potomac, to March 1865. Artillery Reserve, Army of the Potomac, to June 1865.

The 4th Maine Battery mustered out of service June 17, 1865, at Augusta, Maine.

== Detailed service ==
Duty at Augusta until March 14, 1862, and at Portland until April 1. Moved to Washington, D.C., April 1–3, and duty in the defenses of that city until June 28. Ordered to Harpers Ferry, Va., June 28. Battle of Cedar Mountain Va., August 9. Pope's Campaign in northern Virginia August 16-September 2. Fords of the Rappahannock August 20–23. Sulphur Springs August 24. Battles of Groveton August 29, and Bull Run August 30. Battle of Antietam, Md., September 16–17. Duty at Maryland Heights until October 13, and on the Upper Potomac until December 10. At Bolivar Heights until April 7, and at Maryland Heights until June 30. Moved to Monocacy Junction, then to South Mountain, Md., June 30-July 6. Pursuit of Lee July 6–24. Wapping Hetghts, Va., July 23. Camp near Bealton August 1-September 15, and on Culpeper and Warrenton Pike until October 10. Bristoe Campaign October 10–22. Culpeper October 12–13. McLean's Ford October 15. Kelly's Ford November 7. Mine Run Campaign November 26-December 2. Payne's Farm November 27. At Brandy station until March 31, 1864. Rapidan Campaign May 4-June 15. Battle of the Wilderness May 5–7. Spotsylvania May 8–12. Spotsylvania Court House May 12–21. North Anna River May 23–27. Totopotomoy May 28–31. Cold Harbor June 1–12. Siege of Petersburg, Va., June 17, 1864, to April 2, 1865. Mine Explosion, Petersburg. July 30, 1864. Duty in the trenches before Petersburg at various points from the James River to the Weldon Railroad until April 1865. Fall of Petersburg April 2. Sayler's Creek April 6. Appomattox Court House April 9. Surrender of Lee and his army.

== Casualties ==
The battery lost a total of 28 men during service; 5 enlisted men killed or mortally wounded, 1 officer and 22 enlisted men died of disease.

== Commanders ==
- Captain O'Neill W. Robinson
- Lieutenant Melville C. Kimball - commanded at the battle of the Wilderness

== See also ==
- List of Maine Civil War units
- Maine in the American Civil War
