= 1st Maine Infantry Battalion =

- Active: February 1865 to April 5, 1866
- Country: United States
- Allegiance: Union
- Branch: Infantry

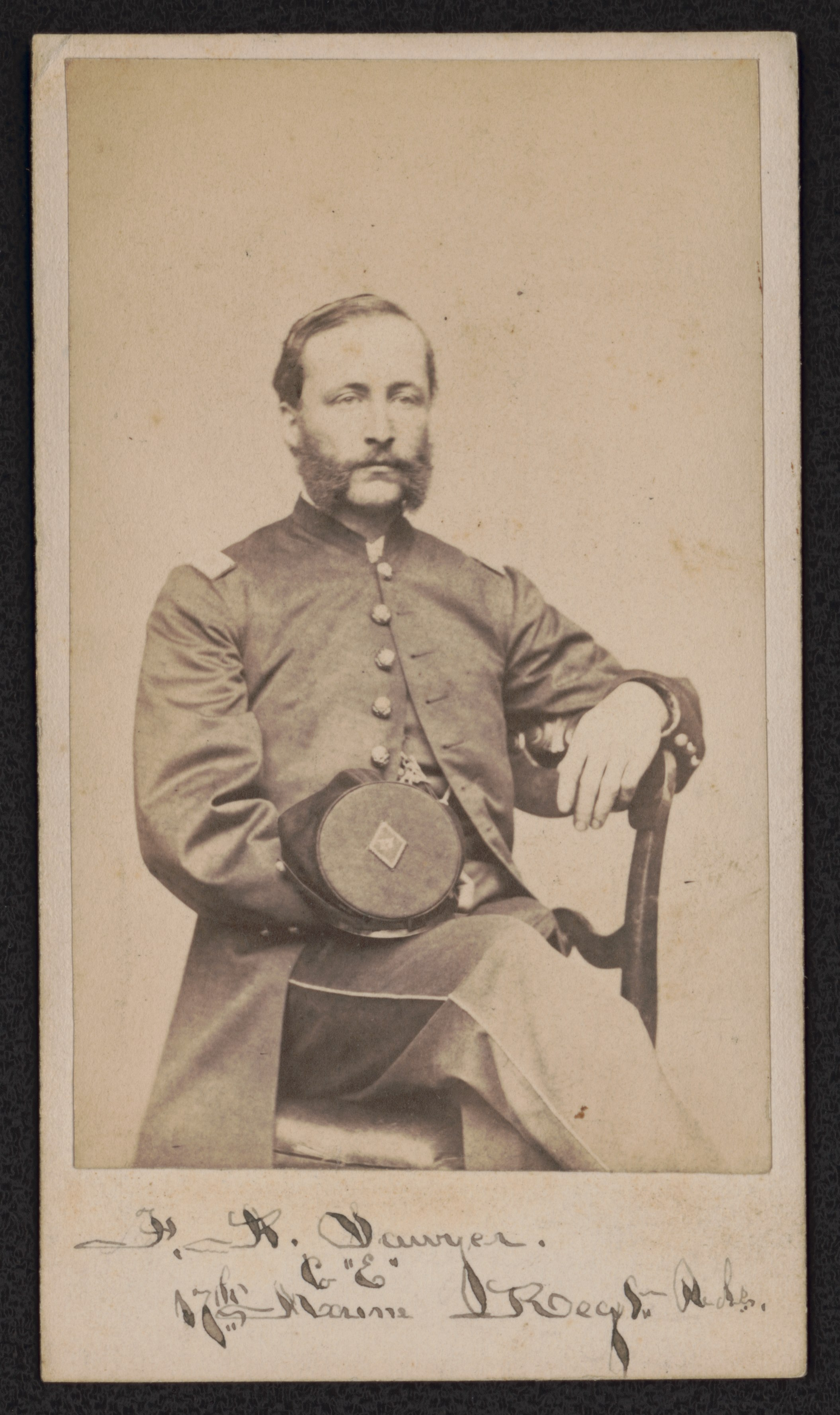
First Sergeant Frederick A. Sawyer of Co. C, 1st Maine Infantry Regiment. From the Liljenquist Family Collection of Civil War Photographs, Prints and Photographs Division, Library of Congress

The 1st Maine Infantry Battalion was an infantry battalion that served in the Union Army during the American Civil War.

== Service ==
The 1st Maine Infantry Battalion was organized in Augusta and Portland, Maine February through March 1865 from the 21st, 24th, 25th, and 26th companies of unassigned infantry.

The battalion was ordered to Summit Point, Virginia and attached to 2nd Brigade, Dwight's Division, Army of the Shenandoah to May 1865. 2nd Brigade, Dwight's Division, Department of Washington, to June 1865. Dwight's Division, Department of the South, to July 1865. 4th Sub-District, District of South Carolina, Department of the South, to August 1865. 3rd Sub-District, Department of the South, to April 1866.

The battalion moved from the Shenandoah Valley to Washington, D.C., May 1, 1865, and served duty there until June 1. Moved to Savannah, Ga., June 1, then to Georgetown, S.C., June 15. To Florence, S.C., July 6-9. Served duty in eastern South Carolina until August 19. At Charleston until August 29, and in 3rd Sub-District, Western South Carolina, until April 1866.

The 1st Maine Infantry Battalion mustered out of service April 5, 1866.

== Casualties ==
The regiment lost a total of 40 men during service, all due to disease.

== See also ==
- List of Maine Civil War units
- Maine in the American Civil War
