= Googins =

Googins is a surname. Notable people with the surname include:

- Scott Googins, American college baseball coach
- Sonya Googins (born 1936), American politician
- William Googins (1838–1926), American Civil War veteran
