= 2nd Maine Light Artillery Battery =

- Active: November 20, 1861, to June 16, 1865
- Country: United States
- Allegiance: Union
- Branch: Artillery
- Equipment: 6 3 inch caliber ordnance rifles
- Engagements: Battle of Cross Keys; Battle of Cedar Mountain; Battle of Groveton; Second Battle of Bull Run; Battle of Fredericksburg; Battle of Chancellorsville; Battle of Gettysburg; Bristoe Campaign; Battle of the Wilderness; Battle of Spotsylvania Court House; Battle of Totopotomoy Creek; Battle of Cold Harbor; Siege of Petersburg; Second Battle of Petersburg; Battle of the Crater

The 2nd Maine Light Artillery Battery was an artillery battery that served in the Union Army during the American Civil War.

== Service ==
The 2nd Maine Battery was organized in Augusta, Maine and mustered in for three years' service on November 20, 1861.

The battery was attached to 2nd Brigade, 2nd Division (McDowell's), Department of the Rappahannock, to June 1862. Artillery, 2nd Division, III Corps, Army of Virginia, to September 1862. Artillery, 2nd Division, I Corps, Army of the Potomac, to June 1863. Artillery Brigade, I Corps, to November 1863. Camp Barry, Defenses of Washington, D.C., XXII Corps, to April 1864. Artillery, 1st Division, IX Corps, Army of the Potomac, to July 1864. Artillery Brigade, IX Corps, to August 1864. Artillery Reserve, Army of the Potomac, to May 1865.

The 2nd Maine Battery mustered out of service June 16, 1865, at Augusta, Maine.

== Detailed service ==
Duty at Augusta until March 10, 1862, and at Fort Preble in Portland, Maine, until April 2. Ordered to Washington, D.C., April 2, and camp at Capitol Hill until April 20. Moved to Potomac Creek, Va., then to Belle Plains April 20–27, 1862. Moved to Falmouth May 9, then to Manassas and Front Royal May 25–30. Moved to Manassas June 16, to Warrenton July 5, to Waterloo July 9, then to Culpeper Court House August 5. Battle of Cedar Mountain August 9. Pope's Campaign in Northern Virginia August 16-September 2. Fords of the Rappahannock August 21–23. Plains of Manassas August 25–27. Thoroughfare Gap August 28. Battle of Groveton August 29. Bull Run August 30. Centreville September 1. Duty in the Defenses of Washington September 11-October 13. Operations in Maryland and Virginia October 13-November 23. Camp at Brooks Station November 23-December 9. Battle of Fredericksburg December 12–15. "Mud March" January 20–24, 1863. Camp near Fletcher's Chapel until April 28. Chancellorsville Campaign April 28-May 8. Operations at Fitzhugh's Crossing April 29-May 2. Battle of Chancellorsville May 2–5. Battle of Gettysburg, July 1–3. At Norman's Ford August 2-September 16. Moved to Culpeper, then to the Rapidan River. Ordered to Camp Barry, Washington, D.C., November 5, and duty there until April 25, 1864. Joined IX Corps April 25. Rapidan Campaign May 3-June 15. Battles of the Wilderness May 5–7. Spotsylvania May 8–12. Ny River May 10. Spotsylvania Court House May 12–21. North Anna River May 23–26. On line of the Pamunkey River May 26–28. Totopotomoy May 28–31. Cold Harbor June 1–12. Bethesda Church June 1–3. Before Petersburg June 15-September 17, 1864. Mine Explosion, Petersburg, July 30. Moved to City Point September 17, and duty in the defenses at that point until May 3, 1865. Defense of City Point September 18, 1864, and April 2, 1865. Moved to Alexandria, Va., May 3, then to Augusta May 31.

== Casualties ==
The battery lost a total of 31 men during service; 1 officer and 4 enlisted men killed or mortally wounded, 26 enlisted men died of disease.

== Commanders ==
- Captain Davis Tillson (promoted to Major, May 1862)
- Captain James A. Hall

== See also ==
- List of Maine Civil War units
- Maine in the American Civil War
