= 7th Maine Light Artillery Battery =

- Active: December 30, 1863, to June 21, 1865
- Country: United States
- Allegiance: Union
- Branch: Artillery
- Engagements: Overland Campaign

7th Maine Light Artillery Battery was an artillery battery that served in the Union Army during the American Civil War.

== Service ==
The 7th Maine Battery was organized in Augusta, Maine and mustered in for three years' service on December 30, 1863.

The battery was attached to 3rd Division, IX Corps, Army of the Potomac, to August 1864. Artillery Brigade, IX Corps, to June 1865.

The 7th Maine Battery mustered out of service June 21, 1865, at Augusta, Maine.

== Detailed service ==
Left Maine for Washington, D.C., February 1, 1864. Duty at Camp Barry until April 25. Campaign from the Rapidan to the James River, Va., May 3-June 15, 1864. Battles of the Wilderness May 5–7; Spotsylvania May 8–12; Spotsylvania Court House May 12–21; North Anna May 23–26. Ox Ford May 23–24. Line of the Pamunkey May 26–28. Totopotomoy May 28–31. Cold Harbor June 1–12. Bethesda Church June 1–3. Before Petersburg June 16–18. Siege of Petersburg June 16, 1864, to April 2, 1865. Mine Explosion, Petersburg, July 30, 1864. Ream's Station August 25. Poplar Springs Church September 29-October 2. Pegram's Farm October 2. Garrison, Fort Welsh, until November 30, and Fort Sedgwick (Fort Hell) and Battery 21 until April 3, 1865. Assault on and capture of Petersburg April. 2–3. Pursuit of Lee April 4–9. At Farmville April 10–20. Moved to Washington, D.C., April 20–28, and camp near Fairfax Seminary to June 5. Grand Review of the Armies May 24. Moved to Augusta, Me., June 5–8.

== Casualties ==
The battery lost a total of 40 enlisted men during service; 13 enlisted men killed or mortally wounded, 27 enlisted men died of disease.

== Commanders ==
- Captain (Brevet Major) Adelbert B. Twitchell

== Notable members ==
- Private James A. Roberts - lawyer and New York state politician

== See also ==
- List of Maine Civil War units
- Maine in the American Civil War
