= 32nd Maine Infantry Regiment =

American civil war infantry unit)

- Active: March 3, 1864 – December 12, 1864
- Country: United States
- Allegiance: Union
- Branch: Infantry
- Engagements: Battle of the Wilderness; Battle of Spotsylvania; Battle of Cold Harbor; Siege of Petersburg; Battle of the Crater

The 32nd Maine Infantry Regiment (1864) was an infantry regiment of the Union army during the American Civil War (1861–1865). It was organized at Augusta, Maine, as a volunteer unit between March 3 and May 6, 1864. Six companies left Maine for Washington, D.C. on April 20, 1864. The remaining four companies left Maine on May 11, 1864, and rejoined the rest of the regiment at North Anna River in Virginia on May 26, 1864. The regiment was attached to the 2nd Brigade, 2nd Division of the IX Corps in the Army of the Potomac, until it was absorbed by the 31st Maine Infantry Regiment on December 12, 1864.

== Battles and Campaigns ==
- Campaign from the Rapidan Camp to the James River, Virginia (May 3–June 15, 1864)
- Battle of the Wilderness, Locust Grove, Virginia (May 5–7, 1864)
- Battle of the Spotsylvania Court House (May 8–21, 1864)
- Battle of North Anna, North Anna River, Virginia (May 23–26, 1864)
- Line of the Pamunkey, Virginia (May 26–28, 1864)
- Battle of Totopotomoy Creek, Virginia (May 28–31, 1864)
- Battle of Cold Harbor, Mechanicsville, Virginia (June 1–12, 1864)
- Battle of Bethesda Church, (June 1–3, 1864)
- Siege of Petersburg (June 16–December 12, 1864)
- Battle of the Crater (Burnside's Mine), Petersburg (July 30, 1864)
- First Battle of the Weldon Railroad (August 18–21, 1864)
- Battle of Poplar Springs Church, Virginia (September 29–October 2, 1864)
- Battle of Boydton Plank Road, Hatcher's Run, Virginia (October 27–28, 1864)

== Total Strength and Casualties ==
The 32nd Regiment lost a total of 202 men during service: 4 Officers and 81 Enlisted men were killed or mortally wounded, while 3 Officers and 114 Enlisted succumbed to disease.

== Commanders ==
- Colonel Mark Fernald Wentworth (1820–1897), regiment commander, wounded at the Battle of the Crater.

== See also ==
- List of Maine Civil War units
- Maine in the American Civil War
