= Daniel Chaplin =

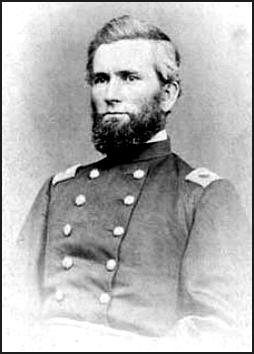
- Born: January 22, 1820; Red Bank, Canada
- Died: August 20, 1864 (aged 44); Philadelphia, Pennsylvania, U.S.
- Burial place: Mount Hope Cemetery, Bangor, Maine
- Military career
- Allegiance: United States
- Branch: United States Army; Union Army
- Service years: 1861–1864
- Rank: Colonel; Brevet Major General
- Unit: 2nd Maine Volunteer Infantry Regiment
- Commands: 1st Maine Heavy Artillery Regiment
- Conflicts: American Civil War; Siege of Petersburg; Battle of Deep Bottom (DOW)

Daniel Chaplin (January 22, 1820 – August 20, 1864) was a Union army officer in the American Civil War. Under Chaplin's command, the ill-fated charge of the 1st Maine Heavy Artillery Regiment against Confederate breastworks during the Siege of Petersburg resulted on the greatest single loss of life by a Union Regiment in a single action. A total of 7 officers and 108 men were killed, and another 25 officers and 464 men wounded. These casualties constituted 67% of the strength of the 900-man force. Chaplin survived the action but while supervising pickets on August 17, 1864, the day after the Battle of Deep Bottom, he was shot by a Confederate sharpshooter, and he died four days later in a Philadelphia hospital.

Chaplin was born in Red Bank, New Brunswick, Canada, on January 22, 1820. He moved with his family to Bridgton, Maine, when he was about three years of age. There he lived until he was about twenty-one, when he became a clerk for Thurston and Metcalf, ship chandlers, of Bangor, Maine. When the Civil War broke out, he enlisted as a private in Company F of the Second Maine Infantry Regiment, which was raised in Bangor. He was chosen Captain of the company May 28, 1861, and was promoted to the rank of Major, September 13 of that year. On July 11, 1862, he was appointed Colonel of the Eighteenth Maine Regiment, which became in January 1863 the First Maine Heavy Artillery.

Chaplin is buried in Mount Hope Cemetery in Bangor. In 1867 he was appointed a Brigadier General by Brevet in the Volunteer Army of the United States, for gallant and meritorious services at the Battle of Deep Bottom, Virginia, to date from 17 August 1864. The same General Order appointed him Major General by Brevet, as of the same date.

In the HISTORY OF THE FIRST MAINE HEAVY ARTILLERY appears this tribute to him: "He was born a soldier, attractive and magnetic in person, a fine horseman with commanding presence. He gave to his officers a royal friendship, to his soldiers a fatherly care, and to all a considerate appreciation of merit, wherever found. He was brave almost to recklessness, but modest withal".

== Sources ==
- Chaplin Family Genealogy Forum https://web.archive.org/web/20110710223901/http://www.genforum.familytreemaker.com/chaplin/messages/303.html

== Bibliography ==
- Eicher, John H., and David J. Eicher; Civil War High Commands; Stanford, CA; Stanford University Press; 2001; p. 170; ISBN 0-8047-3641-3.
