= 31st Maine Infantry Regiment =

American civil war infantry unit (1864 – 1865)

31st Regiment Maine Volunteer Infantry
- Active: April 17, 1864 – July 15, 1865
- Country: United States
- Allegiance: Union (American Civil War)
- Branch: Infantry
- Size: 1,595
- Engagements: Battle of the Wilderness; Battle of Spotsylvania; Battle of Cold Harbor; Siege of Petersburg; Battle of the Crater

The 31st Maine Infantry Regiment (1864–1865) was an infantry regiment of the Union army during the American Civil War (1861–1865). Formed as a volunteer unit in 1864 to supplement the regular army of the North, the regiment engaged in multiple battles against the Confederate army and suffered heavy casualties. Following the Grand Review of the Armies in 1865, the unit was mustered out of service.

== Service ==
The 31st Regiment of the Maine Volunteer Infantry was organized at Augusta, Maine, between March and April 1864 and mustered into service on April 17, 1864, for a three-year enlistment. The regiment left Maine for Washington, D.C., on April 18, 1864, and was attached to the 2nd Brigade, 2nd Division, IX Corps of the Army of the Potomac, in which it served for the remainder of the war. The 31st commenced active campaigning on May 4, 1864, and took its first battle casualties two days later in the Battle of the Wilderness, where it suffered heavy losses. The regiment fought again at Spotsylvania Court House on May 12, again taking heavy casualties: 12 killed, 75 wounded and 108 missing in action.

The regiment fought in engagements at Totopotomoy Creek on May 31 and June 1, 1864. Between June 4 and 12, the regiment arrived before the Confederate camps at Cold Harbor. It crossed the James River and fought in the Second Battle of Petersburg, holding its position for the remainder of the siege. At the Battle of the Crater on July 30, 1864, it was the first regiment than charged the Confederate position and took heavily casualties in the ensuing failed assault.

The 31st regiment support Union forces during the Second Battle of the Weldon Railroad from August 18–21, 1864. They next engaged in the Battle of Poplar Springs Church on September 30, 1864. In October 1864, the regiment absorbed the 4th and 6th Companies of the Maine Unassigned Infantry as Companies L and M. On October 27, it was assigned to Fort Fisher, where the unit remained until the end of November 1864, when it was reassigned as the garrison of Fort Davis. The 31st absorbed the 32nd Maine Regiment on December 12, 1864, adding 15 officers and 470 enlisted men to its ranks. The regiment remained in reserve from February 11, 1865, until the early morning of April 2, when it was chosen to provide the initial storming party of three companies for the assault on Fort Mahone, Petersburg. The regiment suffered heavy losses in the attack. It participated in the occupation of Petersburg and spent the remainder of the campaign gathering and escorting Confederate prisoners to the rear.

On April 29, the regiment marched to City Point, Virginia and sailed to Alexandria, Virginia, arriving on the April 27. The regiment participated in the Grand Review of the Armies on May 23, 1865, and was mustered out of service on July 15, 1865.

== Total strength and casualties ==
During its service, nearly 1,595 men served in the 31st Maine Infantry Regiment. It lost 411 men during the Civil War;183 enlisted men were killed in action or from resulting injuries, 176 died of disease, 34 died in Confederate prisons, and 18 regimental officers were killed. 491 men were wounded in action.

== Notable members ==
- Colonel Daniel White, commander of the 31st Regiment, prisoner of war, and Brigadier General of the Union volunteer army
- J. Sumner Rogers, captain of M Company and founder of the Michigan Military Academy

== Portrayal in media ==
The Battle of the Crater, and the regiment to a lesser extent, are portrayed in the American film Cold Mountain (2003).

== See also ==
- List of Maine Civil War units
- Maine in the American Civil War
