= 4th Maine Infantry Regiment =

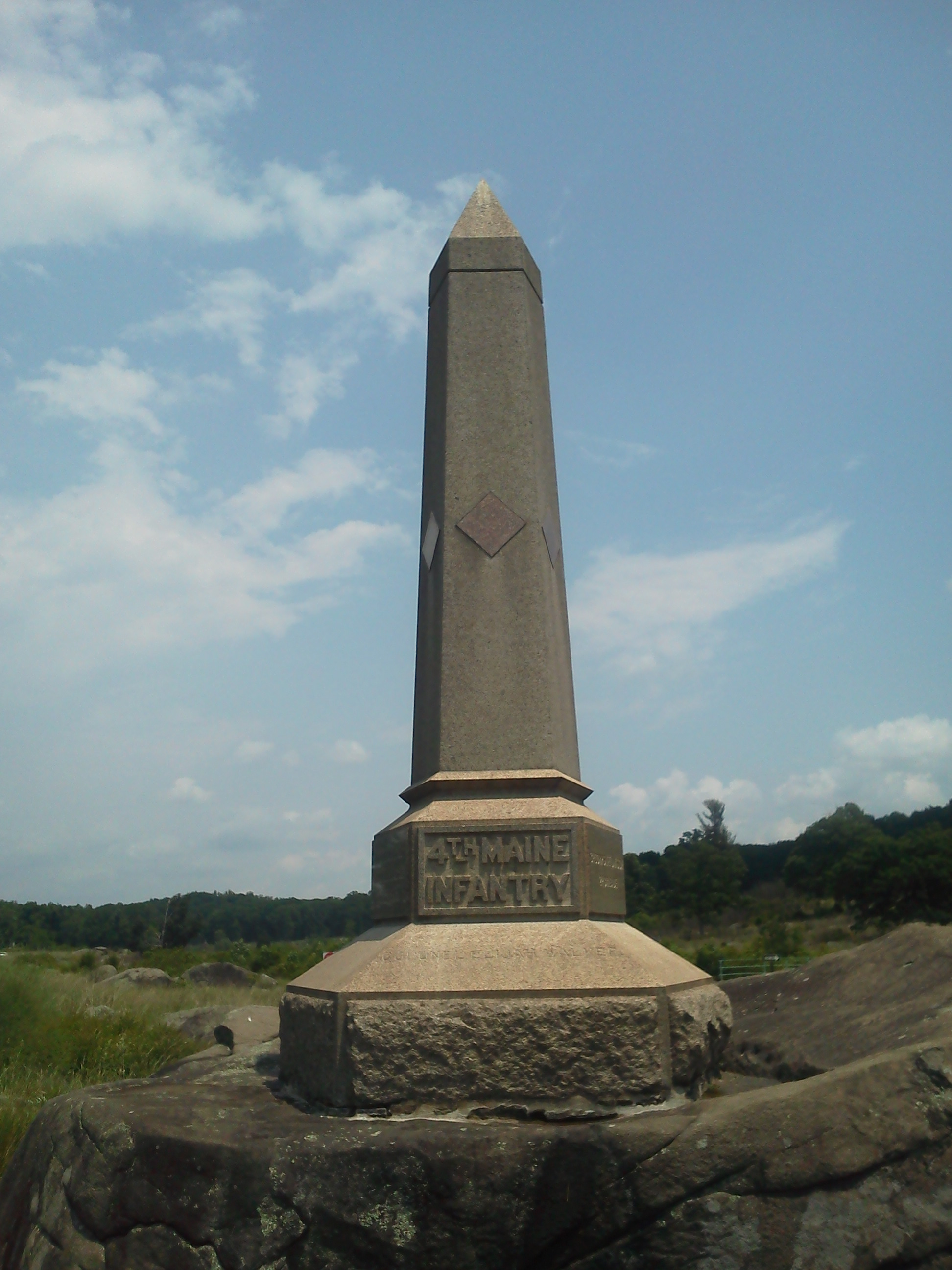
- A monument to the unit at Gettysburg
- Active: June 15, 1861, to July 19, 1864
- Country: United States of America
- Allegiance: Union
- Branch: United States Army
- Type: Infantry
- Size: 1,440
- Engagements: American Civil War: First Battle of Bull Run; Battle of Fredericksburg; Battle of Chancellorsville; Battle of Gettysburg; Battle of the Wilderness; Battle of Spotsylvania Court House; Battle of Cold Harbor

Commanders
- Colonel: Hiram G. Berry

Insignia
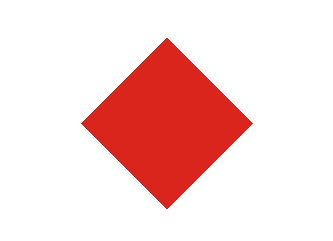
- 1st Division, III Corps

The 4th Maine Infantry Regiment was assembled in Rockland, Maine, on By May 20, 1861, with Colonel Hiram G. Berry as its commanding officer. He received four Knox County companies, one from Searsport, Winterport, Wiscasset, and Damariscotta, and two from Belfast. In all, 1,085 men, including a regimental band, were mustered. The regiment was mustered out of service July 19, 1864, with the expiration of their term. The veteran volunteers and recruits were transferred to 19th Maine Infantry. Of the 1440 men that served in the regiment during the war 170 men were killed in action or died of wounds received in battle. An additional 443 were wounded, 137 men perished of disease, and 40 men expired in Confederate prisons.

== Detailed History ==
This regiment was organized for active service May 8, 1861, and was mustered into the United States service on June 15 at Rockland. Co. A (Belfast Artillery), Co. K (Belfast City (Grays), and Co. F (Brooks Light Infantry), had formed part of the state militia, but the other companies were without previous experience. The regiment left Rockland for Washington on June 17, and was armed with the Springfield smooth-bore musket. Passing through New York, it was presented with two beautiful flags. It participated in all the important battles of the Army of the Potomac during its three years' term of service. Gen. Kearney wrote as follows of the conduct of its gallant colonel at Bull Run: "Col. Berry manifested such a genius for war, and such a pertinacity in the fight, as proved him fit for high command." It is stated that the 4th Me. saved the day at Williamsburg, while at Fair Oaks, White Oak Swamp, Gaines' Mill, Glendale, Gettysburg, the Wilderness, and on many other bloody fields it rendered magnificent service. The heroic commander of the regiment, Hiram G. Berry, was killed amid the awful carnage of the Battle of Chancellorsville, having attained to the rank of major-general and being esteemed one of the most brilliant officers in the service. On June 25, 1864, the regiment arrived in Rockland, its term of service having expired on the 15th, and after being furloughed was mustered out on July 19. It returned under the command of Elijah Walker, who had gone out as captain of Co. B. There were 46 officers in the regiment, including 10 recruits; privates of the original organization, 966; recruits, 513; total, 1,525. Number of officers mustered out, 17; prisoners of war, 2; privates mustered out, 224; prisoners, 37; officers discharged, 5; resigned, 41; privates discharged for disability, 366; privates transferred to other commands, 435; officers died of wounds, 14; of disease, 2; privates died of wounds, 139; of disease, 112; privates deserted, 131. Total, 1,525. The number of officers lost by casualties during the service of the regiment was 65; mustered out July 19, 1864, 17; prisoners of war, 2. Total, 84. Thirty-eight officers were promoted from the ranks.

== Engagements ==
- First Bull Run, VA - July 21, 1861
- Peninsular Campaign
  - Siege of Yorktown, VA - April 5-May 4, 1862
  - Williamsburg, VA - May 4, 1862
  - Seven Pines, VA - May 31, 1862
  - Gaines Mill, VA - June 27–29, 1862
  - White Oak Swamp, VA - June 30, 1862
  - Malvern Hill, VA - July 1, 1862
- Northern Virginia Campaign
  - Second Bull Run, VA - August 29–30, 1862
  - Chantilly, VA - September 1, 1862
- Fredericksburg, VA - December 13, 1862
- Chancellorsville, VA - May 1–4, 1863
- Gettysburg, PA - July 1–3, 1863
- Bristoe Campaign
  - Wapping Heights, VA - July 21–23, 1863
  - Kelly's Ford, VA - November 7, 1863
- Mine Run, VA - November 26-December 1, 1863
- Wilderness, VA - May 5–7, 1864
- Spotsylvania, VA - May 7–20, 1864
- Po River, VA - May 11, 1864
- North Anna, VA - May 23–27, 1864
- Totopotomy, VA - May 26–30, 1864
- Cold Harbor, VA - May 31-June 12, 1864

== Casualties and total strength ==
The 4th Maine enrolled 1,440 men during its existence. 170 men were killed in action or died of wounds received in battle, with another 443 wounded. An additional 137 men died of disease, and 40 men died in Confederate prisons.

== Militia Units ==
- Company A - Belfast Artillery
- Company F - Brooks Light Infantry
- Company K - Belfast City Grays

== See also ==
- List of Maine Civil War units
- Maine in the American Civil War
