= List of Maine units in the American Civil War =

US flag 35 stars, In use 4 July 1863–3 July 1865

List of military units raised by the state of Maine during the American Civil War.

== Infantry ==
- 1st Maine Volunteer Infantry Regiment
- 2nd Maine Volunteer Infantry Regiment
- 3rd Maine Volunteer Infantry Regiment
- 4th Maine Volunteer Infantry Regiment
- 5th Maine Volunteer Infantry Regiment
- 6th Maine Volunteer Infantry Regiment
- 7th Maine Volunteer Infantry Regiment
- 8th Maine Volunteer Infantry Regiment
- 9th Maine Volunteer Infantry Regiment
- 10th Maine Volunteer Infantry Regiment
- 11th Maine Volunteer Infantry Regiment
- 12th Maine Volunteer Infantry Regiment
- 13th Maine Volunteer Infantry Regiment
- 14th Maine Volunteer Infantry Regiment
- 15th Maine Volunteer Infantry Regiment
- 16th Maine Volunteer Infantry Regiment
- 17th Maine Volunteer Infantry Regiment
- 18th Maine Volunteer Infantry Regiment
- 19th Maine Volunteer Infantry Regiment

- 20th Maine Volunteer Infantry Regiment
- 21st Maine Volunteer Infantry Regiment
- 22nd Maine Volunteer Infantry Regiment
- 23rd Maine Volunteer Infantry Regiment
- 24th Maine Volunteer Infantry Regiment
- 25th Maine Volunteer Infantry Regiment
- 26th Maine Volunteer Infantry Regiment
- 27th Maine Volunteer Infantry Regiment
- 28th Maine Volunteer Infantry Regiment
- 29th Maine Volunteer Infantry Regiment
- 30th Maine Volunteer Infantry Regiment
- 31st Maine Volunteer Infantry Regiment
- 32nd Maine Volunteer Infantry Regiment
- 1st Maine Veteran Volunteer Infantry Regiment
- 1st Maine Infantry Battalion
- Company of Maine Sharpshooters [Company D, 2nd U.S. Sharpshooters]
- 1st Battalion Maine Sharpshooters
- Maine Coast Guard Companies
- Maine State Guard
- Maine Home Guard
- Unattached companies of Maine infantry

== Cavalry ==
- 1st Maine Volunteer Cavalry Regiment
- 2nd Maine Volunteer Cavalry Regiment

== Artillery ==
- 1st Maine Heavy Artillery Regiment
- 1st Maine Battery
- 2nd Maine Battery
- 3rd Maine Battery
- 4th Maine Battery

- 5th Maine Battery
- 6th Maine Battery
- 7th Maine Battery
- Maine Garrison Artillery

== See also ==
- Lists of American Civil War Regiments by State
- Maine in the American Civil War
