= 8th Maine Infantry Regiment =

- Active: September 7, 1861, to January 18, 1866
- Country: United States
- Allegiance: Union
- Branch: Infantry
- Engagements: Siege of Fort Pulaski; Battle of Drewry's Bluff; Overland Campaign; Battle of Cold Harbor; Bermuda Hundred Campaign; Second Battle of Petersburg; Siege of Petersburg; Battle of the Crater (reserves); Battle of Chaffin's Farm; Battle of Fair Oaks & Darbytown Road; Third Battle of Petersburg; Battle of Rice's Station; Appomattox Campaign; Battle of Appomattox Court House; }

The 8th Maine Infantry Regiment was an infantry regiment that served in the Union Army during the American Civil War.

== Service ==
The 8th Maine Infantry was organized in Augusta, Maine and mustered in for a three-year enlistment on September 7, 1861.

The regiment was attached to Viele's 1st Brigade, General Thomas West Sherman's South Carolina Expeditionary Corps, October 1861 to April 1862. 1st Brigade, 1st Division, Department of the South, to November 1862. District of Beaufort, South Carolina, X Corps, Department of the South, to April 1863. District of Hilton Head, South Carolina, X Corps, Department of the South, to November 1863. District of Beaufort, South Carolina, X Corps, to April 1864. 2nd Brigade, 3rd Division, X Corps, Army of the James, Department of Virginia and North Carolina, to May 1864. 1st Brigade, 3rd Division, X Corps, to June 1864, 2nd Brigade, 2nd Division, XVIII Corps, to December 1864. 4th Brigade, 1st Division, XXIV Corps, to May 1865. 2nd Brigade, 1st Division, XXIV Corps, May 1865. 2nd Brigade. 1st Division, XXIV Corps, to August 1865. Department of Virginia to January 1866.

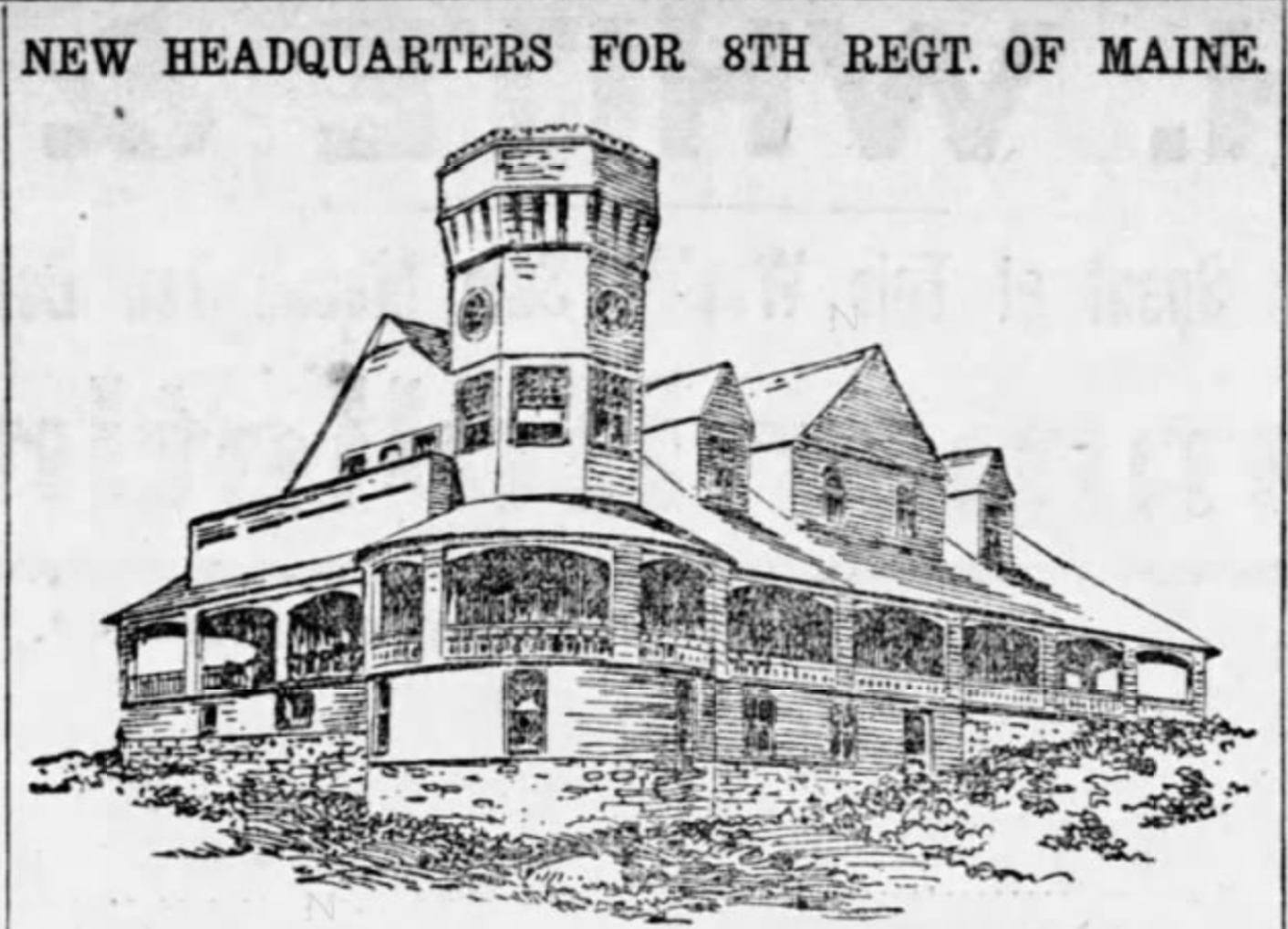

The 8th Maine Infantry mustered out of service January 18, 1866.

== Detailed History ==
This regiment made up of companies from different parts of the state, and was organized at Augusta, Sept. 7, 1861, to serve three years. It entered the service with 770 enlisted men, and in bravery and efficiency was excelled by few, if any regiments in the service. It left the state Sept. 10, for Hempstead, Long Island, N. Y., and subsequently for Fortress Monroe, Va., where it formed a part of Gen. T. W. Sherman's expedition to Port Royal, S. C., which sailed on Oct. 29, and landed at Hilton Head Nov. 8, 1861. For several months the men were engaged in throwing up breastworks and building fortifications. On May 1, 1862, they moved to Tybee Island in the Savannah River, and took a prominent part in the attack on and capture of Fort Pulaski, one of the defenses of Savannah. From this time until the spring of 1864, the regiment was employed for the most part in doing guard duty at Hilton Head and Beaufort, S. C., and at Jacksonville, Fla. It suffered much sickness as the result of the exposures of the spring campaign in 1862, and from diseases contracted in a southern climate. In Nov., 1862, about 300 well drilled and disciplined recruits were sent to the regiment from Maine. In Nov., 1863, while at Beaufort, S. C., its ranks were again replenished by the addition of nearly 200 drafted men, who proved excellent soldiers. In March, 1864, 16 officers and 330 enlisted men, who had reenlisted for a term of three years, received a furlough of 35 days and returned to their homes. In April, 1864, the 8th was transferred to the Department of Virginia, and on May 4, moved to Bermuda Hundred, where it took part in all the active operations of the Army of the James. Sixty veterans, whose term of service had expired, returned to the state, and were mustered out of service on Sept. 15, 1864. The regiment was still large enough, however, to retain its organization as many men had reenlisted and it had received 570 recruits. Until the surrender of Lee at Appomattox, it was engaged in numerous skirmishes and arduous picket and guard duties, and took part in the following important engagements: Drewry's Bluff, losing 96 men, killed, wounded and prisoners; Cold Harbor, where it lost 79 men; the operations before Petersburg, losing 50 men; Chaffin's Farm; Fair Oaks, where it again lost heavily, Spring Hill; capture of Forts Gregg and Baldwin, Rice's Station and Appomattox Court House. After Lee's surrender, it was at Richmond until Aug., 1865, at Manchester until the following November, and at Fortress Monroe until Jan. 18, 1866, when the men were mustered out and proceeded to Augusta, Me., where they were paid and finally discharged.

== Casualties ==
The regiment lost a total of 381 men during service; 6 officers and 128 enlisted men killed or mortally wounded, 4 officers and 243 enlisted men died of disease.

== Commanders ==
- Colonel Henry Boynton
- Colonel William Miltimore McArthur
- Colonel John D. Rust

== See also ==
- List of Maine Civil War units
- Maine in the American Civil War
