= 1st Maine Sharpshooters Battalion =

- Active: October 27, 1864, to June 21, 1865
- Country: United States
- Allegiance: Union
- Branch: Sharpshooters
- Engagements: Siege of Petersburg; Appomattox Campaign; Battle of Five Forks; Battle of Amelia Springs; Battle of High Bridge; Battle of Appomattox Court House

The 1st Maine Sharpshooters Battalion was a sharpshooter battalion in the Union Army during the American Civil War.

== Service ==
The 1st Battalion Maine Sharpshooters was organized in Augusta, Maine October 27 through December 29, 1864.

Companies A and B left Maine for City Point, Virginia, November 12, 1864, and assigned to duty there until January 1865.

Company C was organized November 29, 1864, and moved to Galloupe's Island, Boston Harbor, then moved to City Point, Virginia, January 1–5, 1865.

Company D was organized December 2, 1864. Company E was organized November 28, 1864. Company F was organized December 29, 1864, all three moved to City Point, Virginia, to join the other companies. All were ordered to the Petersburg front and attached to 3rd Brigade, 1st Division, V Corps, Army of the Potomac, January to June 1865.

The 1st Battalion Maine Sharpshooters ceased to exist on June 21, 1865, when its members were transferred to the 20th Maine Infantry.

== Detailed service ==
The regiment was involved in the Siege of Petersburg from January 5 to April 2, 1865. Dabney's Mills, Hatcher's Run, February 5–7. Fort Fisher, Petersburg, March 25. Appomattox Campaign March 28-April 9. White Oak Road March 29. Quaker Road March 30. Boydton Road March 30–31. Five Forks April 1. Amelia Court House April 5. High Bridge April 6. Appomattox Court House April 9. Surrender of Lee and his army. Moved to Washington, D.C., May 2–12 and participated in the Grand Review of the Armies May 23.

== Casualties ==
The regiment lost a total of 19 enlisted men during service; 7 enlisted men killed or mortally wounded, 12 enlisted men due to disease.

== See also ==
- List of Maine Civil War units
- Maine in the American Civil War
