= 1st United States Colored Heavy Artillery Regiment =

1st Regiment Heavy Artillery U.S. Colored Troops
- Active: 1864–1866
- Country: United States
- Allegiance: United States Union
- Branch: Artillery; United States Colored Troops
- Size: Regiment
- Engagements: American Civil War: Stoneman's 1865 raid

The 1st Regiment, United States Colored Heavy Artillery (USCHA) was a unit of African-American troops that served in the Union Army during the American Civil War. The regiment was organized at Knoxville, Tennessee on February 20, 1864.

== History ==
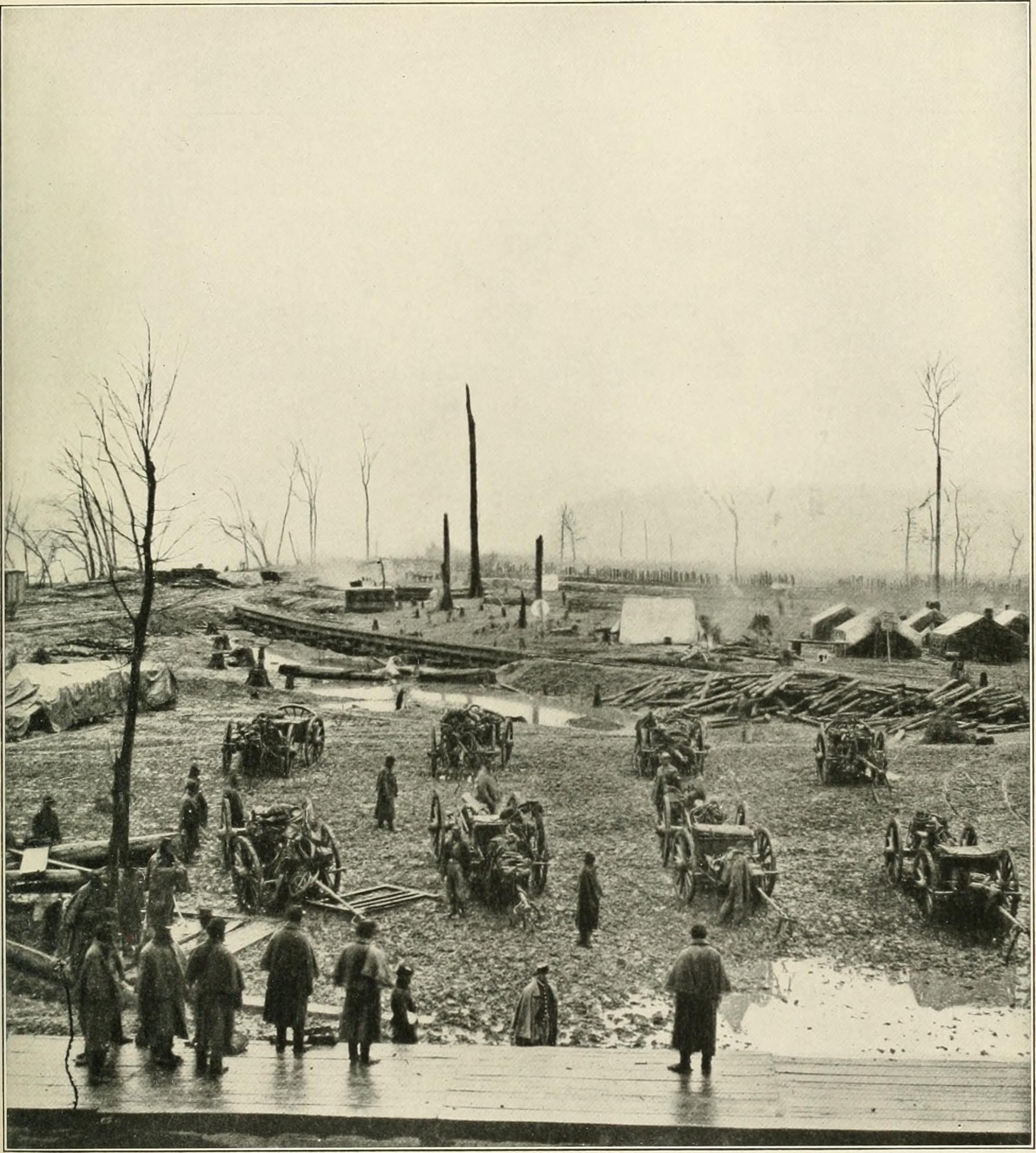
Original caption: 6646. Federal camp at Johnsonville, Tenn.: This is a view taken at Johnsonville the day before its evacuation, in December, 1864. In the foreground is the depot platform and just back of that is the 1st Tennessee Colored Battery. In the background is the camp, the troops drawn up in line. Per The Photographic History of the Civil War this image was taken November 24, 1864. It is unclear if the "First Tennessee Colored Battery" and the 1st Regiment, United States Colored Heavy Artillery are the same or different units

Organization of the regiment may have been instigated in some small part by Lt. Colonel Thomas J. Morgan, commander of the 14th U.S. Colored Troops. In an 1893 reminiscence, John Encill MacGowan wrote that circa April 1864 at Knoxville he was the "senior officer in charge of organizing the First United States Colored Heavy Artillery." The unit was stationed at Knoxville until January, 1865, and then were based in Greeneville, District of East Tennessee, until March, 1866. The regiment was mustered out March 31, 1866.

The newly organized unit was supervised by "General Davis Tillson, Chief of Artillery, Department of Ohio, commanding defenses of Knoxville, Loudon and Kingston. The regiment had between 1,100 and 1,700 soldiers drawn mostly from Tennessee and North Carolina. According to a 2003 article in the journal Army History, "More than 25,000 black artillerymen, recruited primarily from freed slaves in Confederate or border states, served in the Union Army during the Civil War...Federal military authorities armed and equipped the soldiers in these twelve-company heavy artillery regiments as infantrymen and ordinarily used them to man the larger caliber guns defending coastal and field fortifications located near cities and smaller population centers in Louisiana, Mississippi, Tennessee, Kentucky, and North Carolina."

From February 1864 until February 1865 the 1st Regiment was attached to the Army of the Ohio (2nd Brigade, 4th Division, 23rd Corps) under Gen. Schofield, and then in March 1865 transferred to the Army of the Cumberland, under Gen. Thomas. (The surrender at Appomattox Courthouse was signed April 9, 1865, initiating the conclusion of the American Civil War.) From March 1865 to March 1866, the 1st Regiment USCHA was part of the 1st Brigade, 4th Division, District of East Tennessee, Army of the Cumberland.

== Actions ==
- Operations against Confederate troops led by Joseph Wheeler in East Tennessee August 15–25, 1864
- Operations in northern Alabama and east Tennessee January 31-April 24, 1865
- Stoneman's 1865 raid

== Incidents ==
Three members of the regiment were tried on rape charges, convicted and executed.

== Notable enlisted men ==
- Sgt. Moses Smith, later Knoxville policeman and city alderman, "U.S. local officer" of U.S. Custom House in Knoxville
- Edward Taylor, who served in Co. M 1 U.S.C.H.A., is buried in the family graveyard of the whites who once owned him; former Confederate Major General George Duffield Taylor, a cousin of Robert Love Taylor and Alf Taylor, testified at a pension hearing on his behalf
- Joseph George, retired sergeant, murdered 1896 in Marysville, Tennessee, leaving a widow and nine children
- Henry Smith, first sergeant of Company G, married Florence Johnson, a formerly enslaved housemaid and cook for U.S. President Andrew Johnson

== Post-bellum ==
Between 14 and 30 veterans of the 1st U.S. Colored Heavy Artillery are buried at the historic Odd Fellows Cemetery in Knoxville.

== See also ==
- Franklin–Nashville campaign
- Massacre at Fort Pillow
- Memphis riots of 1866
- List of United States Colored Troops Civil War units
