= Daniel White (general) =

- Born: 1833; Winterport, Maine
- Died: 1895 (aged 61–62); Boston, Massachusetts
- Military career
- Allegiance: United States of America: Union
- Branch: Union Army
- Rank: Colonel; Bvt. Brigadier General
- Unit: 2nd Maine Infantry Regiment
- Commands: 31st Maine Infantry Regiment
- Conflicts: American Civil War
- Other work: Businessman

Daniel White (1833–1895) was a Union Army officer in the American Civil War from the state of Maine.

== Biography ==
Born in Winterport, Maine, a suburb of Bangor, White's father was a sea captain. In 1855 he spent a year mining for gold in California, returning to start a manufacturing venture in Bangor. With the outbreak of the American Civil War in 1861, White raised and commanded a company of the 2nd Maine Infantry Regiment, the first regiment to march out of the state. When the unit was mustered out of service in 1863, White returned to the front with the 31st Maine Infantry Regiment, and was promoted to Colonel the following year. During the Battle of the Crater, part of the Richmond-Petersburg Campaign, White was captured by Confederate forces and held as a prisoner of war for seven months, but eventually was repatriated through a prisoner exchange. In 1865 he was brevetted Brigadier General of Volunteers.

After the war White ran a soap manufactory in Bangor, and remained an active veteran and member of the Grand Army of the Republic. He died in Boston in 1895, and is buried at Mount Hope Cemetery, Bangor.

== See also ==
- List of American Civil War brevet generals (Union)
