= Society of the Army of the Potomac =

The Society of the Army of the Potomac was a military society founded in 1869 which was composed of officers and enlisted men who served with the Army of the Potomac during the American Civil War.

== History ==
After the conclusion of the Civil War, a number of organizations were founded by veterans of the Union armed forces to commemorate the service and sacrifice of those who had served the Union cause during the war. The most prominent of these organizations were the Military Order of the Loyal Legion of the United States (MOLLUS) and the Grand Army of the Republic (GAR). Several other organizations were also founded to commemorate specific organizations such as the Society of the Army of the Cumberland and the Society of the Army of Tennessee.

In 1869, the Society of the Army of the Potomac was founded and Lieutenant General Philip Sheridan was elected as its first president. A total of 12 vice presidents were also elected, representing 10 corps which served with the army as well as the artillery and the general staff.

As the Society did not provide for hereditary membership, the Society gradually diminished as the veterans of the Civil War died off during the early twentieth century. By 1906, the Society had diminished to only 350 members. It held its last annual reunion in 1927.

== Insignia ==
The Society had an elaborate insignia, made of gold, which was manufactured by Bailey, Banks and Biddle jewelers of Philadelphia.

The insignia has a top piece of crossed cavalry sabres, a blue and white ribbon, a pair of crossed cannons below the ribbon and a planchet in the form of a six armed cross enameled in red with the badges of six of the corps assigned to the army. In the center of the cross is a seal with a crescent moon, a star and a cypher of the letters A and P.

Reproductions of the insignia, not made of gold, are sold on an on-line auction website.

== Prominent members ==
Note - the rank indicated is the highest held by the individual either in the Regular Army or the Volunteers either during or after the Civil War.

- General Ulysses S. Grant
- General Philip Sheridan
- Lieutenant General Samuel Baldwin Marks Young
- Major General George Meade
- Major General Ambrose Burnside
- Major General Joseph Hooker
- Major General George McClellan
- Major General Daniel Butterfield
- Major General Silas Casey
- Major General Joshua Chamberlain
- Major General George Custer
- Major General Abner Doubleday
- Major General George Sears Greene
- Major General George Lewis Gillespie Jr.
- Major General Winfield Scott Hancock
- Major General Daniel Sickles
- Major General Emory Upton
- Major General Gouverneur K. Warren
- Brevet Major General Henry Jackson Hunt
- Brevet Major General Alexander S. Webb
- Brigadier General Lucius Fairchild
- Brevet Brigadier General Stephen Moffitt
- Brevet Brigadier General Nelson Viall
- Brevet Colonel Elisha Hunt Rhodes
- Brevet Major Augustus P. Davis
