= Russell B. Shepherd =

American businessperson (1829–1901)

Russell Benjamin Shepherd (September 14, 1829 - January 1, 1901) was an American businessman and politician from Maine.

Shepherd was born in 1829 in Fairfield, Maine. His parents were Quakers. He attended common schools in Fairfield before attending Bloomfield Academy in nearby Skowhegan, Maine. He then traveled to California to work in mines. California was in the midst of the California Gold Rush. After two years, he returned to Maine and studied at Waterville College, graduating in 1857. He then went into teaching for five years which included time as the Principal of Bloomfield Academy and the girls' high school in Bangor, Maine. In August 1862 he joined the Union Army, being commissioned as First Lieutenant and adjutant in the 18th Maine Volunteer Infantry Regiment. A year later the regiment was renamed 1st Maine Heavy Artillery Regiment. When he mustered out of service on September 8, 1865, Shepherd was the regiment's commander with the rank of Colonel. After the war ended he was brevetted brigadier general. He purchased a cotton plantation in Georgia after leaving the Army, where he resided for nearly a decade. He then returned to Skowhegan, where he resided for the remainder of his life. A Republican, Shepherd was elected to the Maine House of Representatives, the Maine Senate, and the Executive Council.

== See also ==
- List of American Civil War brevet generals (Union)
