= Tillson Farm Barn =

- U.S. National Register of Historic Places
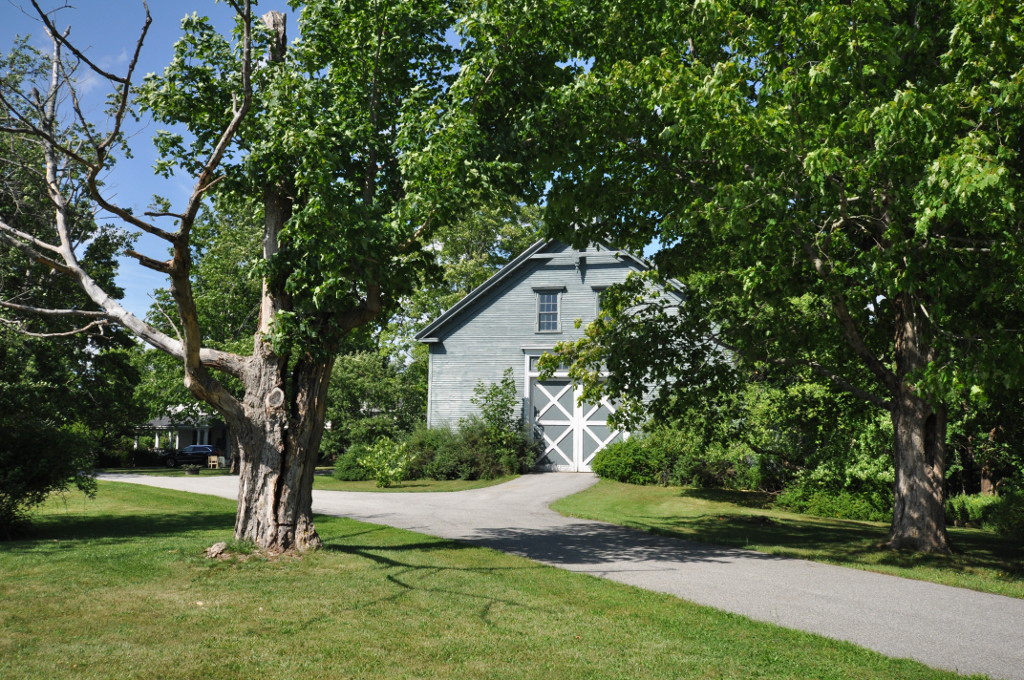

- Location within Maine Location within the United States
- Location: Off Warrenton Rd., Rockport, Maine
- Coordinates: 44°7′49″N 69°5′23″W
- Area: less than one acre
- Built: 1880
- Architectural style: Italianate
- NRHP reference No.: 90001902
- Added to NRHP: December 18, 1990

The Tillson Farm Barn is an architecturally significant 19th-century barn on Warrenton Road in the Glen Cove area of Rockport, Maine. Probably built in the early 1880s, it is distinguished for its relatively elaborate Italianate decoration. It was listed on the National Register of Historic Places in 1990.

== Description and history ==
The Tillson Farm Barn stands on the south side of Warrenton Road, directly south of the head of Glen Cove, and northwest of the Riley School campus. It is a single-story rectangular wood-frame structure with a gabled roof, weatherboard exterior, and granite foundation. The roof is capped by two square cupolas, each of which has paired windows on each side, with chamfered corner posts and a bellcast hip roof. The front facade faces south (away from the road, from which it is screened by trees), and is dominated by a large tracked board-and-batten door with a transom window above. There are two sash windows above the door, with hooded moulding and cornices, and there is a decorative truss in the gable above, whose vertical member extends above the roof to form a sort of finial. The rake edge of the gable is adorned with modillions. The interior of barn, although utilitarian in nature, features turned posts and tongue-and-groove paneling in some of the stalls.

The land on which the barn was built was purchased by Davis Tillson in the late 1870s, and the barn is first listed on the tax rolls in 1886. (The house standing on the property nearby is a later structure not associated with the Tillsons.) Most of Maine's 19th-century agricultural barns have basically vernacular appearances, making this one particularly unusual for its elaborate decorative treatment.

== See also ==
- Gen. Davis Tillson House, Tillson's Gothic Revival house in Rockland
- National Register of Historic Places listings in Knox County, Maine
