= Augustus P. Davis =

American army officer

- Born: May 10, 1835; Gardiner, Maine
- Died: May 21, 1899 (aged 64); Pittsburgh, Pennsylvania

Brevet Major Augustus Plummer Davis (May 10, 1835 – May 21, 1899) was a Union Army officer during the American Civil War. He is best known as the founder of the Sons of Union Veterans of the Civil War.

== Early life ==
Davis was born in Gardiner, Maine and was the son of Anthony and Mary Davis. His father was of Welsh extraction. He had ancestors who served in the American Revolution and the War of 1812. At the age of 14 Davis left home and travelled to San Francisco as part of the 1849 California Gold Rush. His dreams of finding a fortune did not come to pass and he returned his career as a sailor in 1850. He worked on various ships over the next five years. He enlisted in the Royal Navy for four years during the Crimean War. He was discharged from the Royal Navy in 1860 and returned to his family in Maine later that year.

== American Civil War ==
Shortly after the attack on Fort Sumter in April 1861, Davis volunteered to serve in the 11th Maine Volunteer Infantry Regiment and was elected as captain of Company F on May 11, 1861. Shortly afterwards, the 11th Maine was sent south to serve with the Army of the James. In April 1862 he was detached from the 11th Maine and detailed as Provost Marshal of the division commanded by Major General Silas Casey. He was wounded in action at the Battle of Fair Oaks and spent several weeks recovering in the hospital.

On March 7, 1863, Davis resigned from the Army and returned to Maine. The resignation was accompanied by a surgeon's certificate dated the same day and signed by Dr. D. W. Hand, Surgeon and Medical Director of General Peck's Division. In reference to Davis, Dr. Hand wrote, ...he has tubercular deposits in the right lung, with pleuritic adhesions on that side. In consequence, I believe the exposure incident to field service will very soon assuredly break down his health. Soon after his arrival in Maine, on April 24, 1863, he was appointed as Provost Marshal for the 3rd District of Maine and re-commissioned as captain. He held this position until he was honorably discharged on August 15, 1865. On June 22, 1867 Davis received a brevet (i.e. honorary promotion) to the rank of major to date from March 15, 1865.

== Later life ==
After the war, Davis joined Alexander Hays Post 3 of the Grand Army of the Republic in Pittsburgh. On January 14, 1880, he was elected as a Veteran Companion of the First Class of the Pennsylvania Commandery of the Military Order of the Loyal Legion of the United States (MOLLUS). He was assigned MOLLUS insignia number 1981.

On November 12, 1881, Davis organized the first camp (i.e. local chapter) of the Sons of Veterans of the United States of America (SV) which would later be renamed as the Sons of Union Veterans of the Civil War (SUVCW). In Davis' original conception, the SV was to be a military training program for young men aged 14 and above. In addition to instilling discipline and patriotism, the SV was also intended to be a military reserve force which could be called on in time of war. Although Davis was ineligible for membership in the SV, in August 1884 Davis was declared by the SV's Commander-in-Chief to be a Past Commander-in-Chief and a Past Grand Division Commander and was given the privilege of joining the camp of the SV of his own choosing.

Although the SV was never officially affiliated with the Grand Army of the Republic (GAR), the ties between the two organizations were strong. On February 13, 1954, Albert Woolson, the last surviving member of the GAR, signed a deed of conveyance giving all remaining GAR property to the SUVCW. Davis died in Pittsburgh in 1899. He was buried at Allegheny Cemetery in Pittsburgh.

== Personal life ==
In 1866, Davis married Mary Ann Gilpatrick. They had one son, Herbert Anthony Davis, born on January 27, 1868. Mary Ann died suddenly on March 11, 1872. Three months later, Davis married Lizzie E. Parks. Shortly after his second marriage, Davis moved to Pittsburgh, Pennsylvania on the advice of his doctor to live in a drier climate. In Pittsburgh, Davis pursued a career as an insurance executive. Davis' second son, Charles K. Davis, was born in Pittsburgh shortly after his arrival. Davis and his wife divorced in 1876. That same year, Davis' disability pension was denied since he had a respiratory condition since childhood. Davis' pension was eventually restored in 1886.

Davis belonged to numerous American fraternal, patriotic, and veterans' organizations to include the Military Order of the Loyal Legion of the United States, General Society of the War of 1812, Grand Army of the Republic, Sons of Union Veterans of the Civil War, Knights of Pythias, Society of the Army of the Potomac, Society of the Army of the James, Union Veteran League, Sons of the American Revolution, and the Military Order of Foreign Wars.
