= Camp Barry =

Artillery military camp in the US

- Washington, D.C.
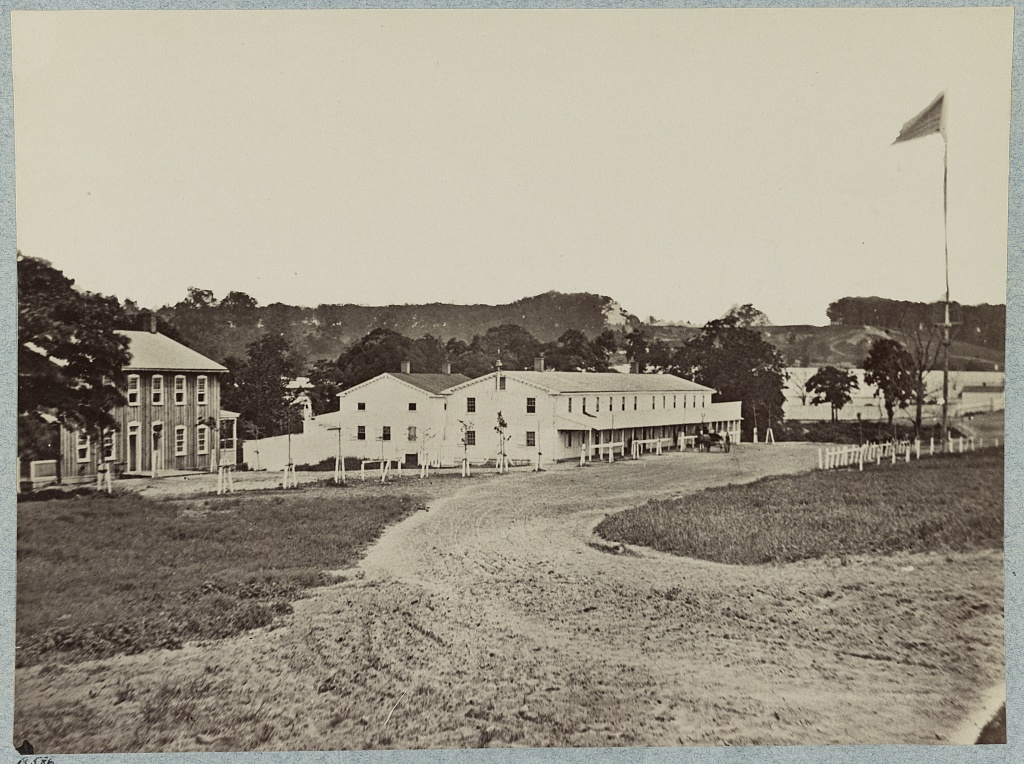
- Barracks on the right at Camp Barry during the Civil War

Site information
- Controlled by: Union Army
- Condition: Residential Area

Location
- Coordinates: 38°54′03.1″N 76°58′55.2″W

Site history
- Built: 1862
- In use: 1865
- Materials: Timber
- Battles/wars: American Civil War

Camp Barry was a temporary artillery military camp near Washington, D.C., United States, during the Civil War.

== Location ==
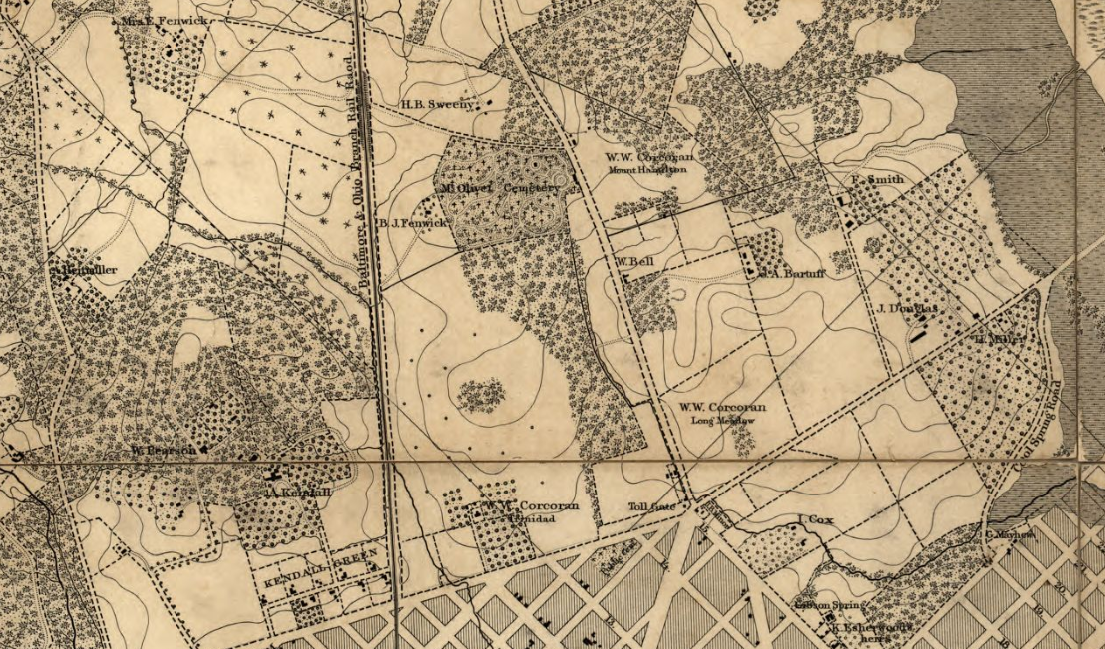
The Corcoran properties near H Street in 1861

It was located on the "Corcoran Farm located on H Street NE near the Bladingsburg Tollgate".

William W. Corcoran owned several sections of land around the Tollgate as seen on maps at the time. These included:

- "Trinidad" (now Trinidad, Washington, D.C.)
- "Long Meadow" (later part of Graceland Cemetery and now part of the Carver Langston neighborhood)
- "Mount Hamilton" further north on the Bladingsburg Turnpike.

While the exact location is not known, all the descriptions of the camp mention the Bladingsburg tollgate as being close by. It is generally believed that it was located on "Long Meadow".

== History ==
It was established as an artillery camp for the instruction of all volunteer batteries, drills and discipline preparation for service in the field as well as an artillery depot. Originally setup with Sibley tents, wooden barracks were built in the winter of 1862–1863.

The following troops barracked at the camp:

- Battery H, 1st Rhode Island Light Artillery from October 28, 1862, to January 19, 1863. It replaced the James rifled guns they had received in Rhode Island with three-inch ordnance guns there. They were the first to move in the wooden barracks on January 1, 1863
- 12th Independent Battery, Ohio Light Artillery (Union Ohio Volunteers) from June 1863 to September 1863.
- 7th Battery Light Artillery ("G") (Union Maine volunteers) from the time they left the State of Maine on February 1, 1864, to April 25, 1864
- 3rd Battery Light Artillery ("C") (Union Maine volunteers) from March 25, 1864, to July 5, 1864.
- 2nd Battery Light Artillery ("B") (Union Maine volunteers) from November 5, 1863, to April 25, 1864.
- 10th Independent Battery, New York Light Artillery (Union New York Volunteers) July 1863 to June 1864.
- 1st Battalion, Maine Light Artillery (Union Maine Volunteers) from April 20, 1864, to July 30, 1864.
- 16th Independent Battery, Massachusetts Light Artillery from July, 1864 to November 1864.

On April 3, 1865, Richmond, Virginia, is captured by the Union Army. The Secretary of War, Edwin Stanton, received a telegraph informing him of the news. The news spreads all over Washington, D.C., and Battery H of the 14th Pennsylvania Artillery started firing one hundred guns at the camp.

On Wednesday, May 17, 1865, during the Trial of the Murderer of President Lincoln, the Camp is mentioned by Lieutenant John J. Taffey, a prosecution witness when cross-examined by Mr. Doster.

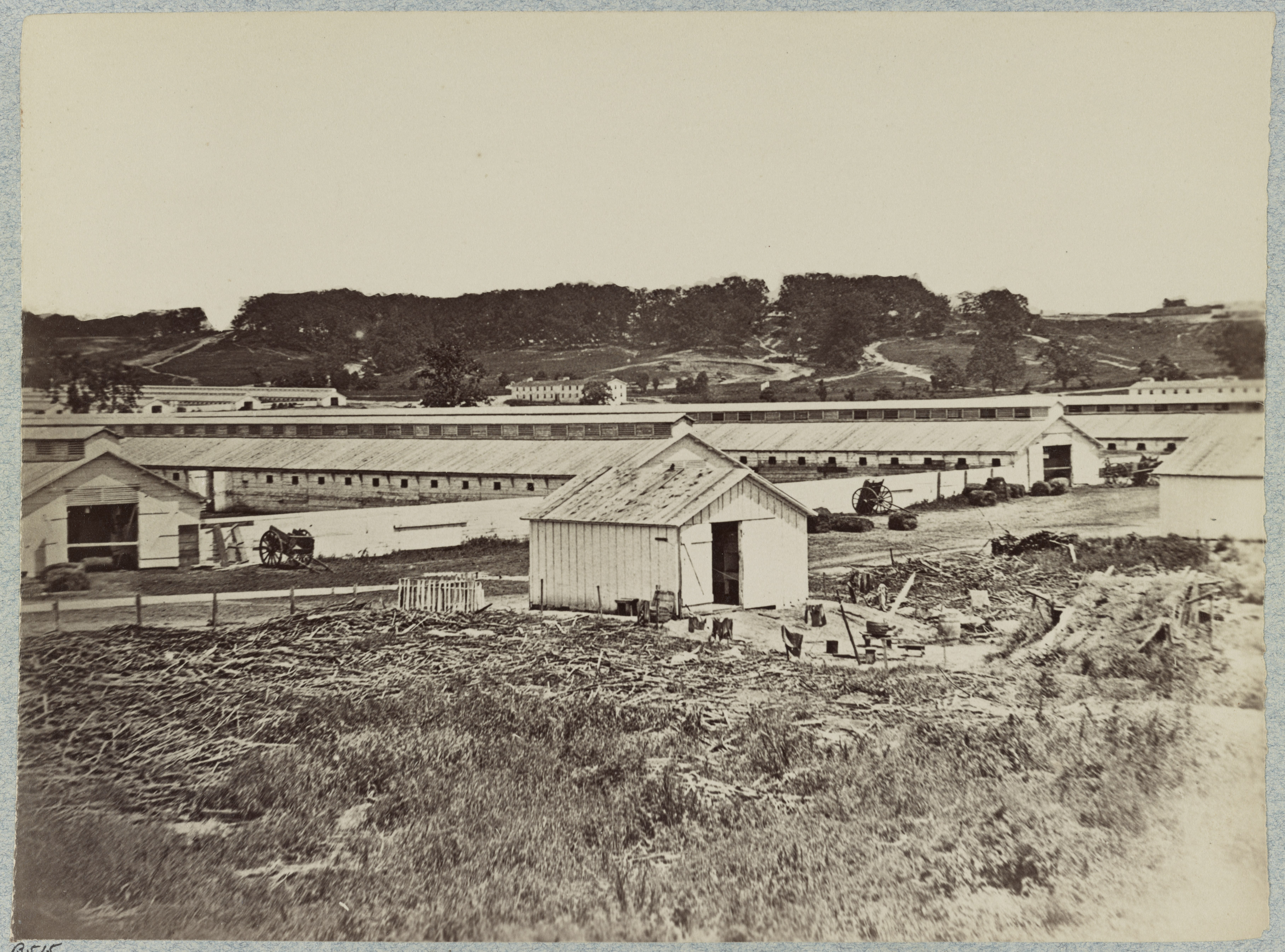
Artillery Depot at Camp Barry

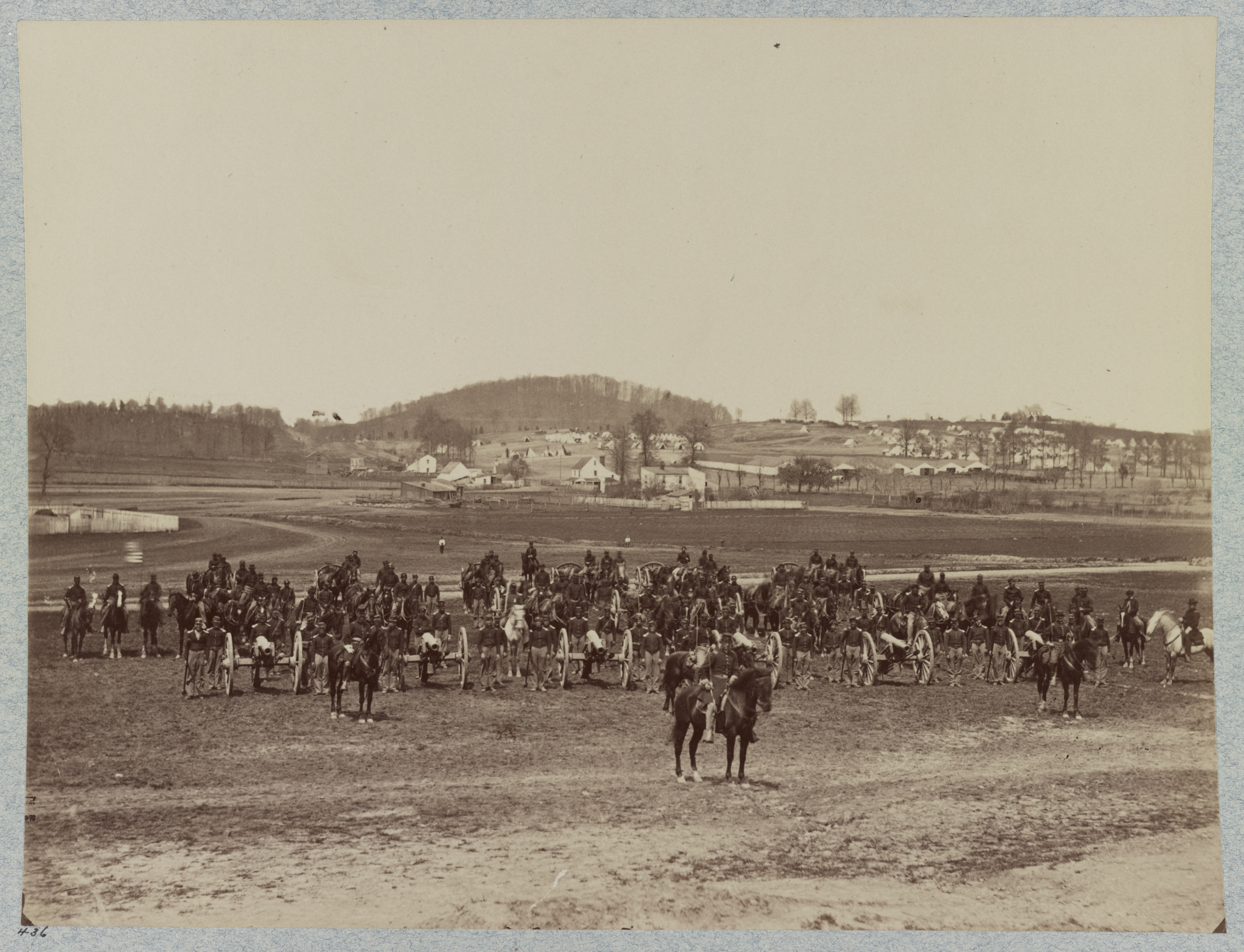
17th New York Battery at Camp Barry

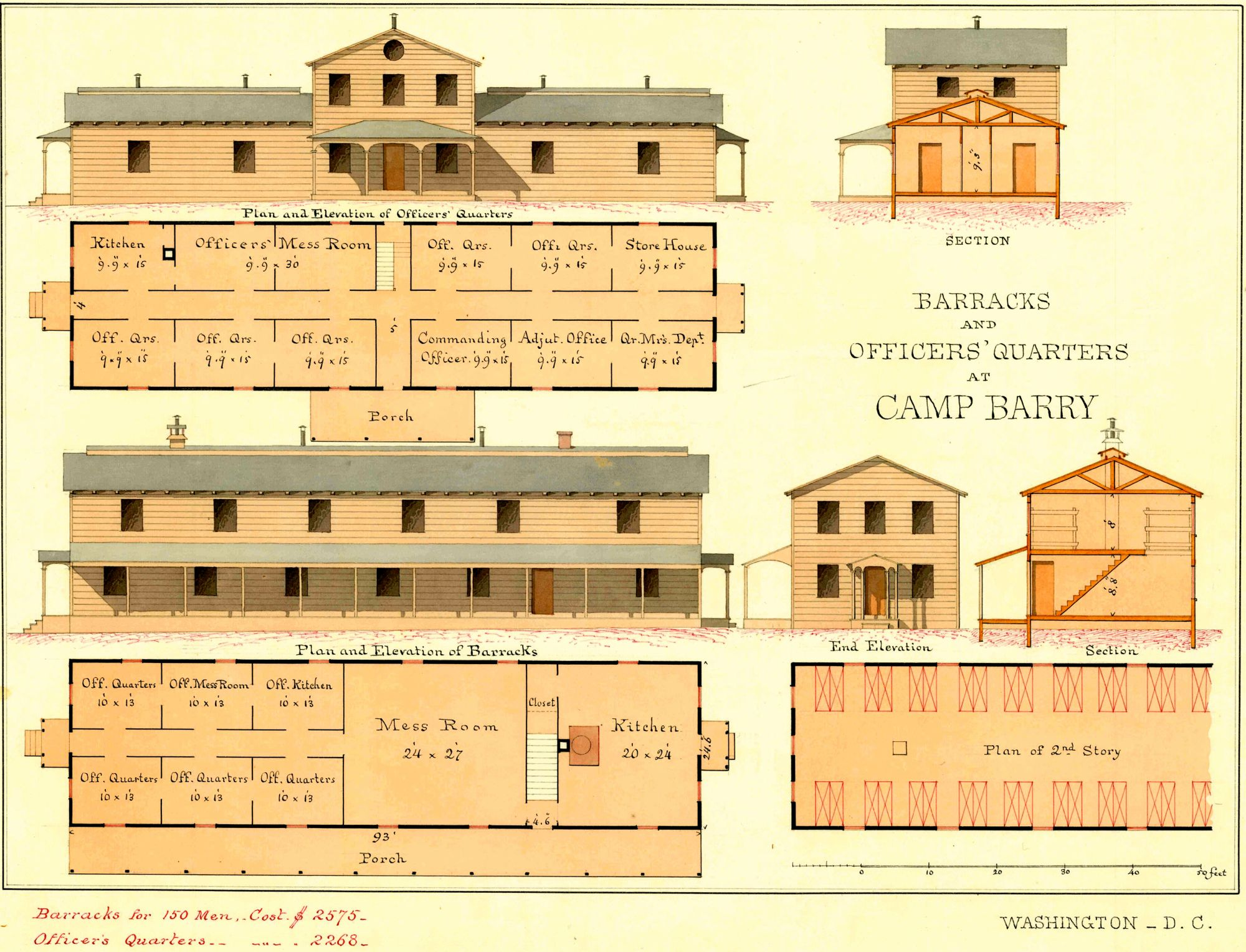
Plans for the Barracks and Officers' Quarters at Camp Barry, Washington DC

== See also ==
- Civil War Defenses of Washington
- Washington, D.C., in the American Civil War
