= 12th Ohio Independent Light Artillery Battery =

12th Ohio Battery
- Active: March 17, 1862, to July 12, 1865
- Country: United States
- Allegiance: Union
- Branch: Artillery
- Engagements: Battle of Cheat Mountain; Battle of McDowell; Battle of Cross Keys; Battle of Groveton; Second Battle of Bull Run; Chancellorsville Campaign

12th Ohio Battery was an artillery battery that served in the Union Army during the American Civil War.

== Service ==
The 12th Ohio Battery was created from Company G, 25th Ohio Infantry Regiment (which originally entered service on July 27, 1861) and permanently detached on March 17, 1862, under Captain Aaron C. Johnson.

The battery was attached to Milroy's Independent Brigade, Department of the Mountains, to June 1862. Milroy's Independent Brigade, I Corps, Army of Virginia, to September 1862. Artillery, 2nd Division, XI Corps, Army of the Potomac, to January 1863. Provost Guard, Army of the Potomac, to May 1863. Unattached, Artillery Reserve, Army of the Potomac, to June 1863. Camp Barry, Defenses of Washington, D.C., XXII Corps, to September 1863. Artillery Brigade, XI Corps, Army of the Cumberland, to December 1863. 2nd Division, Artillery Reserve, Department of the Cumberland, to April 1864. Garrison Artillery, Murfreesboro, Tennessee, Department of the Cumberland, to July 1864. 1st Brigade, Defenses Nashville & Chattanooga Railroad, Department of the Cumberland, to July 1865.

The 12th Ohio Battery mustered out of service on July 12, 1865.

== Detailed service ==
Prior to being detached as artillery the company was ordered to western Virginia July 29, 1861, and attached to 1st Brigade, Army of Occupation West Virginia, to November 1861, then attached to Milroy's Cheat Mountain District, West Virginia, to March, 1862. It performed duty along the Baltimore & Ohio Railroad from Grafton to the Ohio River until August 21, 1861. Moved to Cheat Mountain Summit August 21. Action at Cheat Mountain September 12–17. Cheat Mountain Pass September 14–15. Greenbrier October 3–4. Moved to Huttonsville November 25, and duty there until February 27, 1862. Expedition to Camp Baldwin December 11–13, 1861. Buffalo Mountain December 12–13. Raid to Huntersville December 31-January 5, 1862. At Elkwater until March.

After being detached as artillery, the battery participated in the expedition on the Seneca April 1–12. At Staunton to May 7. Battle of McDowell May 8. Franklin May 10–12. Battle of Cross Keys June 8. Pope's Campaign in northern Virginia August 16-September 2. Fords of the Rappahannock August 21–23. Freeman's Ford and Hazel Run August 22. Battle of Groveton August 29. Second Battle of Bull Run August 30. Duty in the defenses of Washington, D.C., until December. Moved to Fredericksburg, Va., December 12–16. "Mud March" January 20–24, 1863. Chancellorsville Campaign April 27-May 6. Duty in the defenses of Washington, D.C., until September. Moved to Bridgeport, Ala., September 25-October 6. Garrison duty at Nashville, Tenn., until April 1864, and at Murfreesboro, Tenn., until July 1865. Defenses of Murfreesboro December 5–12, 1864. Wilkinson's Pike December 7.

== Casualties ==
The battery lost a total of 20 enlisted men during service; 3 enlisted men killed or mortally wounded, 17 enlisted men died due to disease.

== Commanders ==
- Captain Aaron C. Johnson

== See also ==
- List of Ohio Civil War units
- Ohio in the Civil War
