= Davis Tillson =

American army general and politician

Davis Tilson
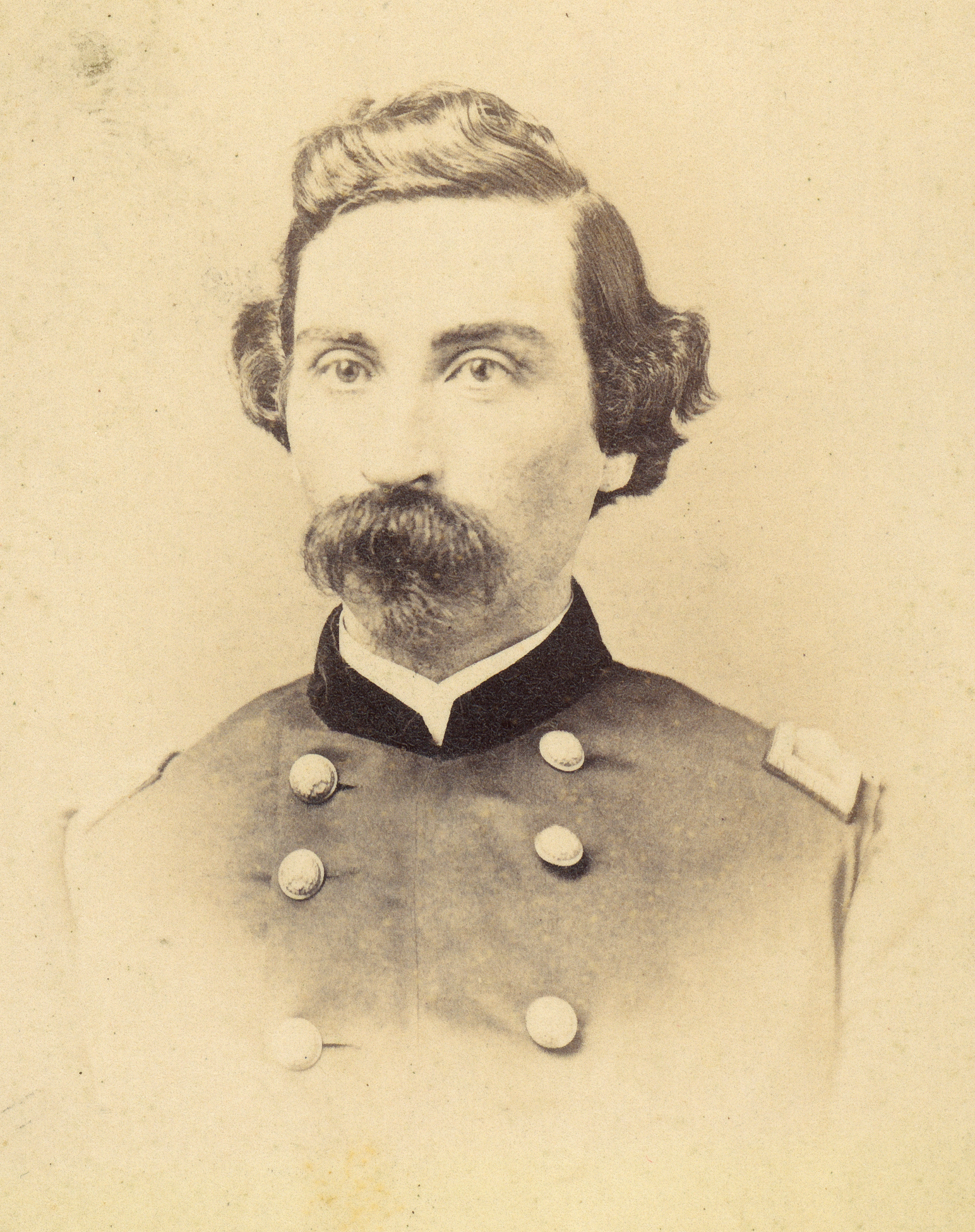
- Born: April 14, 1830; Rockland, Maine, U.S.
- Died: April 30, 1895 (aged 65); Rockland, Maine, U.S.
- Burial place: Achorn Cemetery, Rockland
- Military career
- Allegiance: United States of America
- Branch: Maine Militia; Union Army
- Service years: 1858–1861; 1861–1867
- Rank: Brigadier General; Brevet Major General
- Commands: Adjutant-General of Maine; 2nd Maine Battery; Artillery, III Corps; Artillery, Department of the Ohio; 4th Division, XXIII Corps; District of East Tennessee
- Conflicts: American Civil War: Battle of Cedar Mountain; Second Battle of Bull Run
- Other work: politician, businessman, Freedmen's Bureau agent

Davis Tillson (April 14, 1830 – April 30, 1895) was a general in the Union Army during the American Civil War. Being mostly connected to his home in Rockland, Maine throughout his life, he also served as a state representative, militia leader and Freedmen's Bureau agent, eventually becoming a business magnate.

== Biography ==
=== Early life ===
Tillson was born in Rockland, Maine, on April 14, 1830. He attended the United States Military Academy at West Point from 1849 as a member of the class of 1853. Suffering a puncture wound in a foot, his health issues worthened so much that it was amputated in 1850. He resigned from the academy in the next year. In 1857 he was elected to the Maine House of Representatives and in the next year became Adjutant-General of the state's militia, serving on that post till the start of the American Civil War. In July 1861 Tillson was made a U.S. Customs agent by President Abraham Lincoln. He was married to Margaret E. Tillson (née Achorn) and had two daughters.

=== American Civil War ===
After the American Civil War broke out, Tillson resigned from his posts, became an artillerist in late 1861, and organized the 2nd Maine Battery. Throughout the winter, him and his unit were kept in the state by the Trent Affair, eventually leaving and joining the Army of Virginia in April 1862. Tillson soon became a divisional artillery commander in the III Corps, fighting at Cedar Mountain, and he headed the corps artillery at Second Bull Run. Later in the year he was made Inspector of Artillery of the defences at Washington D.C. In March 1863 he was promoted to Brigadier General, backdated to November 29, 1862. With that rank he went westwards as Chief of Artillery of the Department of the Ohio for a year. During that time he also supervized the organization of the 1st U.S. Colored Heavy Artillery Regiment. Afterwards he served as brigade commander in the XXIII Corps in East Tennessee. During the final months of the war he briefly led the division and the District of East Tennessee.

=== Later life ===
Tillson was brevetted Major General for his services in the war but stayed in the Volunteer service until the end of 1866. During that time he served as Assistant Commissioner of the Freedmen's Bureau in Georgia. He remained in the area for another year, trying out life as a cotton planter, before returning home to Maine. There the businessman found success in the quarrying of granite and limestone. Tillson died at Rockland on April 30, 1895, and is buried there on Achorn Cemetery.

Two buildings of his, the home in Rockland and a barn house in nearby Glen Cove, are still existing and are listed in the National Register of Historic Places.

== See also ==
- List of American Civil War generals (Union)
