= Henry W. Wheeler =

American Union soldier during Civil War

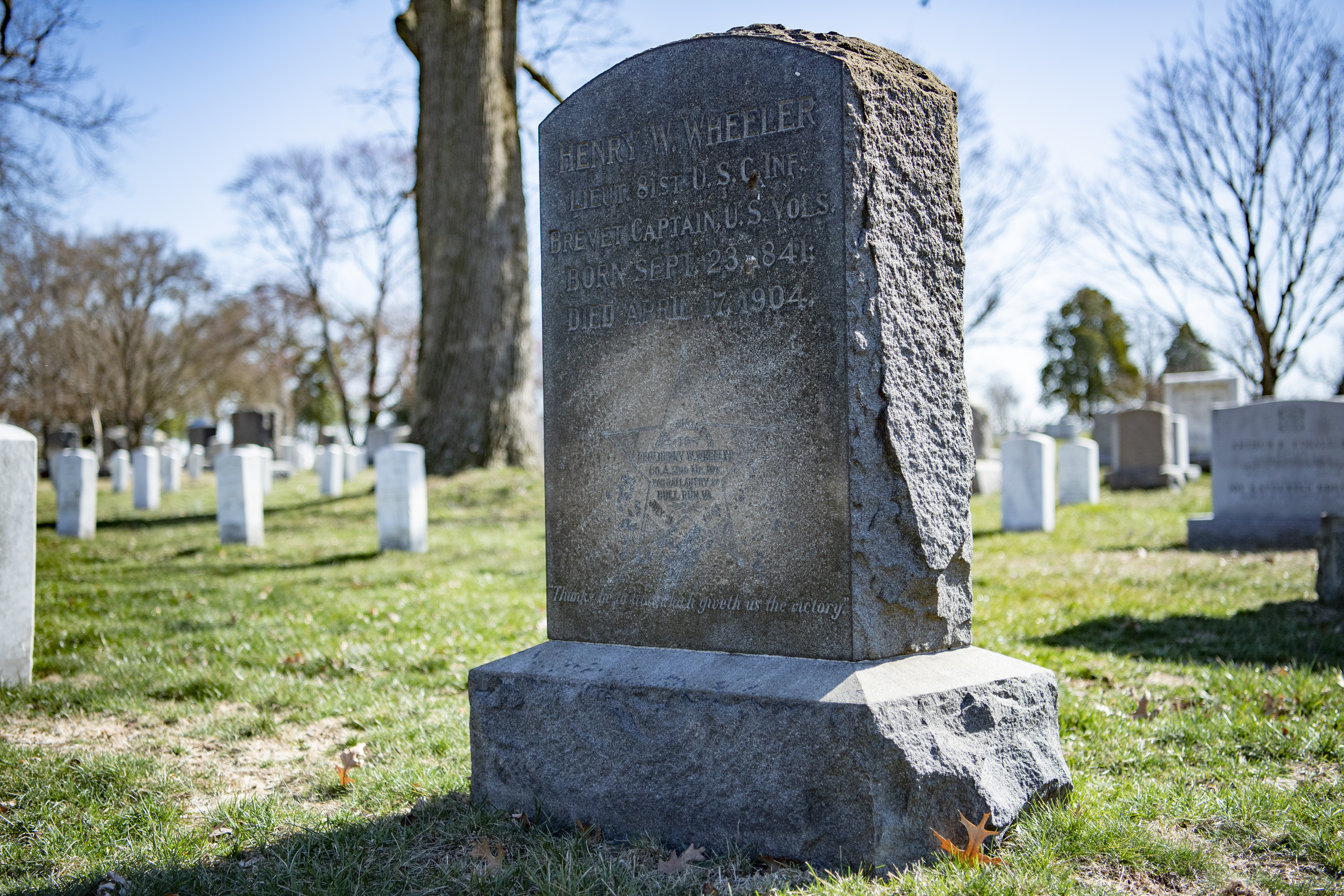
Grave at Arlington National Cemetery

Henry W. Wheeler (September 23, 1841 – April 17, 1904) was an American soldier and recipient of the Medal of Honor who fought in the American Civil War.

He was born in Fort Smith, Arkansas on September 23, 1841. He joined the 2nd Maine Volunteer Infantry as a private on April 25, 1861. Wheeler earned his Medal of Honor on July 21, 1861, during the First Battle of Bull Run, Virginia. In August 1866, Wheeler received a brevet rank of captain for his actions during the war.

Wheeler died on April 17, 1904, and was buried at Arlington National Cemetery in section 3, plot 1496.

== Medal of Honor citation ==
For extraordinary heroism on 21 July 1861, in action at Bull Run, Virginia. Private Wheeler voluntarily accompanied his commanding officer and assisted in removing the dead and wounded from the field under a heavy fire of artillery and musketry.
