= 11th Maine Infantry Regiment =

- Active: November 12, 1861 - February 2, 1866
- Country: United States
- Allegiance: Union
- Branch: Infantry
- Engagements: Peninsula Campaign; Siege of Yorktown; Battle of Williamsburg; Battle of Seven Pines; Battle of Bottom's Bridge; Battle of White Oak Swamp; Battle of Malvern Hill; Battle of Gloucester Court House; Battle of Fernandia; Siege of Charleston; Battle of Chester Station; Bermuda Hundred Campaign; Battle of Proctor's Creek; Petersburg Campaign; First Battle of Deep Bottom; Second Battle of Deep Bottom; Battle of Chaffin's Farm; Siege of Petersburg; Battle of New Market Roads (October 7, 1864); Battle of Darbytown Road (October 13, 1864); Battle of Hatcher's Run; Appomattox Campaign; Battle of Fort Gregg; Battle of Appomattox Court House

The 11th Maine Infantry Regiment was an infantry regiment that served in the Union Army during the American Civil War.

== Service ==
The 11th Maine Infantry was organized in Augusta, Maine, and mustered in for a three-year enlistment on November 12, 1861, under the command of Colonel John Curtis Caldwell.

The regiment was attached to Davis' Provisional Brigade, Army of the Potomac, to January 1862. 1st Brigade, Casey's Division, Army of the Potomac, to March 1862. 1st Brigade, 3rd Division, IV Corps, Army of the Potomac, to June 1862. 1st Brigade, 2nd Division, IV Corps, to December 1862. Naglee's Brigade, Department of North Carolina, to January 1863. 2nd Brigade, 2nd Division, XVIII Corps, to February 1863. 1st Brigade, 2nd Division, XVIII Corps, Port Royal, South Carolina, Department of the South, to April 1863. District of Beaufort, South Carolina, X Corps, Department of the South, to June 1863. Fernandina, Florida, Department of the South, to October 1863. 1st Brigade, Morris Island, South Carolina, X Corps, Department of the South, to April 1864. 2nd Brigade, 1st Division, X Corps, Army of the James, Department of Virginia and North Carolina, to May 1864. 3rd Brigade, 1st Division, X Corps, to December 1864. 3rd Brigade, 1st Division, XXIV Corps, to July 1865. 2nd Brigade, 1st Division, XXIV Corps, to August 1865. Department of Virginia, to February 1866.

The 11th Maine Infantry mustered out of service at City Point, Virginia, on February 2, 1866.

== Detailed service ==
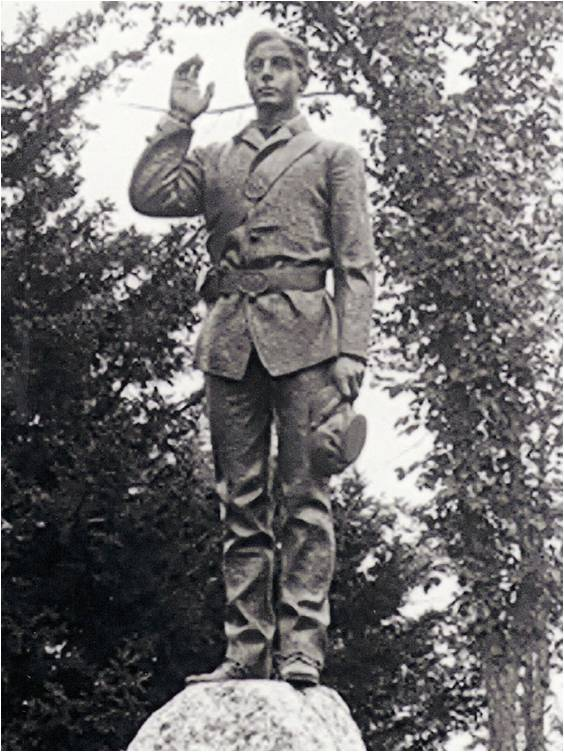
Union private Daniel A. Bean of Brownfield, Maine, 11th Maine Volunteer Infantry Regiment by John Wilson (sculptor)

Left Maine for Washington, D.C., November 13. Duty in the defenses of Washington, D. C., until March 1862. Advance on Manassas, Va., March 10–15. Moved to Newport News March 28. Siege of Yorktown April 5-May 4. Battle of Williamsburg May 5. Operations about Bottom's Bridge May 20–23. Battle of Fair Oaks, Seven Pines, May 31-June 1. Guard Bottom's Bridge June 13–26. Seven days before Richmond June 25-July 1. Destruction of railroad bridge over Chickahominy June 27. Bottom's Bridge June 28–29. White Oak Swamp June 30. Malvern Hill July 1. At Harrison's Landing until August 15. Moved to Yorktown August 16–22, and duty there until December 26. Expedition to Matthews County December 11–15. Moved to Morehead City, N.C., December 26-January 1, 1863, then to Port Royal, S.C., January 28–31. To St. Helena Island February 10, and duty there until April 4. Expedition against Charleston April 4–12. At Beaufort, S.C., until June. Moved to Fernandina, Fla., June 4–6, and duty there until October 6. (A detachment acting as artillery on Morris Island, S.C., during siege of Fort Wagner, and operations against Charleston, July to October 1863.)

The regiment moved to Morris Island October 6 and siege operations against Charleston until April 1864, then ordered to Gloucester Point, Va. Butler's operations on south side of James River and against Petersburg and Richmond May 4-June 15. Occupation of City Point and Bermuda Hundred May 5. Port Walthal May 6–7. Ware Bottom Church May 9. Swift Creek or Arrowfield Church May 9–10. Operations against Fort Darling May 12–16. Drury's Bluff May 14–16. Bermuda Hundred May 17-June 20. Action at Bermuda Hundred June 2 and 14. Port Walthal, Bermuda Front, June 16–17. Siege operations against Petersburg and Richmond June 16, 1864, to April 2, 1865. Deep Bottom June 20 and 25. Grover House, Deep Bottom, July 21. New Market Heights, Deep Bottom, July 27–28. Strawberry Plains August 14–18. In trenches before Petersburg August 27-September 26. New Market Heights September 28–29. Chaffin's Farm September 29–30. Darbytown and New Market Roads October 7. Darbytown Road October 13. Fair Oaks October 27–28. Chaffin's and Johnson's Farms October 29. Non-veterans left front for muster out November 7. Duty on north side of James River before Richmond until March 27, 1865. (Detached for duty at New York City during election of 1864, November 5–17, 1864.) Moved to Hatcher's Run March 27–29. Appomattox Campaign March 28-April 9. Assault and capture of Forts Gregg and Baldwin and fall of Petersburg April 2. Pursuit of Lee to Appomattox April 3–9. Rice's Station April 6. High Bridge April 7. Clover Hill, Appomattox Court House, April 9. Surrender of Lee and his army. Duty at Richmond, Va., April 24 to November 24, and at Fredericksburg, Va., until January 19, 1866. Mustered out at City Point, Va., February 2, 1866.

== Casualties ==
The regiment lost a total of 359 men during service; 7 officers and 115 enlisted men killed or mortally wounded, 4 officers and 233 enlisted men died of disease.

== Commanding officers ==
- Colonel John Curtis Caldwell - promoted to brigadier general
- Colonel Harris Merrill Plaisted
- Colonel Jonathan Augustus Hill
- Lieutenant Charles Sellmer

== Notable members ==
- Private Ruel C. Burgess, Company D - member of the Maine legislature
- Captain Augustus P. Davis, Company F - founder of Sons of Union Veterans of the Civil War
- Private Elwin A. Ireland, Company B - U.S. Marshal for the Territory of Utah, 1882 - 1886

== See also ==
- List of Maine Civil War units
- Maine in the American Civil War
