= Gen. Davis Tillson House =

Historic house in Maine, United States

- U.S. National Register of Historic Places
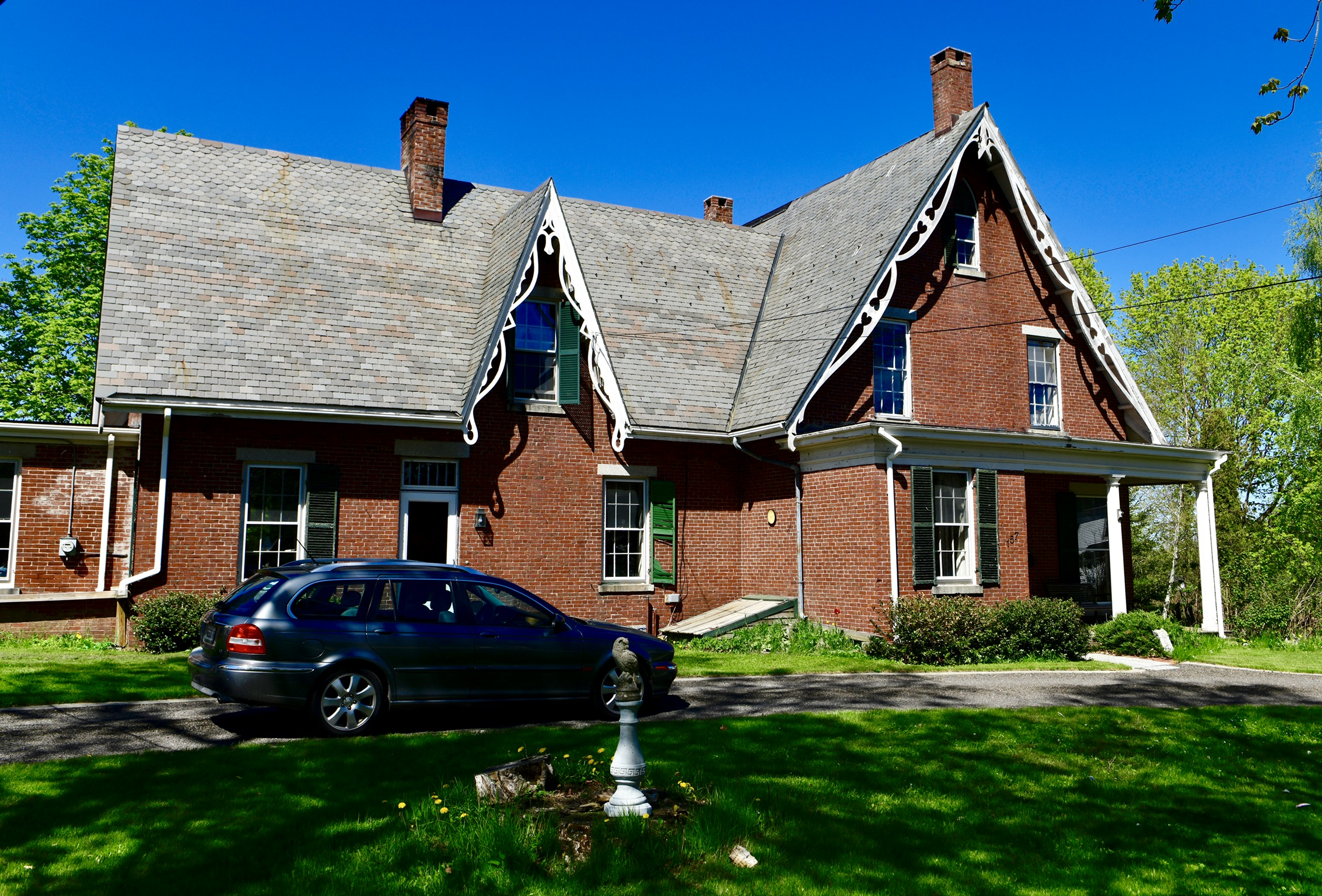

- Location within Maine
- Location: 157 Talbot Ave., Rockland, Maine
- Coordinates: 44°6′34″N 69°7′19″W
- Area: 0.5 acres (0.20 ha)
- Built: 1853
- Architectural style: Gothic Revival
- NRHP reference No.: 83000464
- Added to NRHP: January 11, 1983

The Gen. Davis Tillson House is a historic house at 157 Talbot Avenue in Rockland, Maine. Built in 1853, it is one of the region's finest examples of residential Gothic Revival architecture, and is unusual statewide for its execution in brick. It was built for Davis Tillson, a general during the American Civil War and a prominent local businessman, and was listed on the National Register of Historic Places in 1983.

== Description and history ==
The Tillson House stands on the north side of Talbot Avenue, in a rural residential area west of downtown Rockland. It is 2 1/2 stories in height, with a gabled roof, brick walls, and wooden trim. The gables are steep, in the Gothic Revival tradition, and the main end gables as well as dormer gables are decorated with jigsawn vergeboard. The front facade is six bays wide, with the right three in a projecting gabled section. Two of that gables bays are recessed, forming a porch with Gothic columns, and the gable edge extends to a crested railing above the first floor. Most windows are sash, with granite sills and lintels; windows near the gable peaks have Gothic-arched tops and granite sills.

The house was built in 1853, and is the only major example of the Gothic Revival in Rockland. The house was built for Brigadier General Davis Tillson, and artillery and infantry commander in the American Civil War, seeing action at Cedar Mountain and elsewhere. Tillson was also a prominent local businessman, owning some of Rockland's lime manufactories, and building its large city wharf.

== See also ==
- Tillson Farm Barn, an architecturally distinguished barn built by Tillson in Rockport
- National Register of Historic Places listings in Knox County, Maine
