= 1st Maine Heavy Artillery Regiment =

- Active: August 21, 1862 – September 20, 1865
- Disbanded: September 20, 1865
- Country: United States
- Allegiance: Union
- Branch: Artillery
- Size: Regiment
- Engagements: American Civil War: Battle of Spotsylvania Court House; Siege of Petersburg; Second Battle of Petersburg

The 1st Maine Heavy Artillery Regiment was a regiment in the Union Army during the American Civil War. It suffered more casualties in an ill-fated charge during the Second Battle of Petersburg than any Union regiment lost in a single day of combat throughout the war. It was also the Union regiment with the highest number of officers killed (23)

The regiment was mustered in Bangor, Maine, in 1862 as the 18th Maine Volunteer Infantry Regiment and consisted mostly of men and officers from the Penobscot River Valley (the area around Bangor and points east). It was commanded by Col. Daniel Chaplin, a Bangor merchant. Charles Hamlin, son of Vice President Hannibal Hamlin, was originally an officer in this regiment, but was promoted to a position on the staff of Maj. Gen. Hiram G. Berry before it saw significant action.

The regiment's name was changed in 1863 to the 1st Maine Heavy Artillery Regiment, and it served in the defenses of Washington, D.C. before being reassigned to the Army of the Potomac during the Overland Campaign in the spring of 1864. At the Battle of Spotsylvania Court House, the regiment took its first heavy casualties—6 officers and 76 men killed, and another 6 officers and 388 men wounded. At the Second Battle of Petersburg, however, an ill-advised charge across an open field toward Confederate breastworks on June 18, 1864, ordered by Chaplin, resulted in the greatest single loss of life in a Union regiment to occur in the war, with 7 officers and 108 men killed, and another 25 officers and 464 men wounded. These casualties constituted 67% of the strength of the 900-man force. Chaplin survived the action but was later killed by a sharpshooter. The regiment was commanded by Russell Benjamin Shepherd for the remainder of the war.

All in all, the 1st Maine sustained one of the highest casualty rates in the war, with 423 killed, and another 260 died of disease. A monument to the 1st Maine stands on the former battlefield at Petersburg.

== See also ==
- List of Maine Civil War units
- Maine in the American Civil War
