= Tortugas Banks =

Coral reefs in the Florida Keys, US

Coordinates: 24.6251°N 83.0695°W

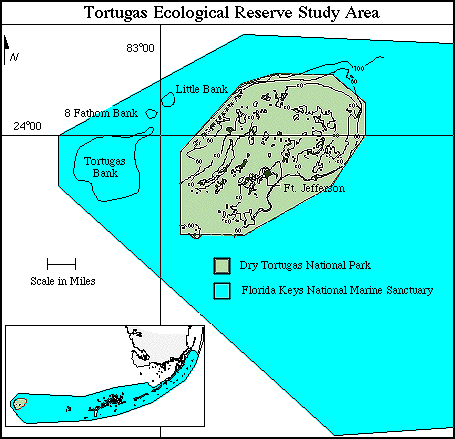
Tortugas Bank overview map

The Tortugas Banks are coral reefs that developed on a foundation of Pleistocene karst limestone at depths of 20 to 40 m. The banks are extensive with low coral diversity, but high coral cover. The most conspicuous coral is Montastraea cavernosa, and black coral (Antipatharia) are common on the outer bank edges. The banks are also used by groupers and snappers that support a major fishery. The banks lie within the Florida Keys National Marine Sanctuary.

== Features ==
Tortugas Bank is the westernmost feature of the Florida Keys, but it is a submarine feature, wholly submerged, without any islands or above-water rocks. The least known depth is 11 meters. A depth of less than 18 meters is found in a circle of 4 km diameter around the center of the bank. Tortugas Bank is about 14 km west of Loggerhead Key, the westernmost islet of the Dry Tortugas and the closest piece of land. 8 Fathom Bank, about 6.5 km northeast of the center of Tortugas Bank Little Bank, about 11 km northeast of the center of Tortugas Bank
