= William Googins =

Union United States Army soldier

William Hayes Googins (August 20, 1838 – May 1, 1926) was a Union veteran of the American Civil War. He was a soldier in the 27th Maine Regiment known for its controversial, and later revoked, Medals of Honor.

== Biography ==
William Googins was born on August 20, 1838, in Old Orchard now Old Orchard Beach, Maine. He was the seventh child and fourth son of Nathaniel Littlefield Googins (1798–1879) and Lucy Thurston (1803–1870). He spent most of his early life in Old Orchard.

Googins enlisted in the volunteer 27th Maine Infantry Regiment as a private in Company A, and was mustered into service on September 30, 1862. He was one of 300 or so people to remain in service after their term expired.

After the war, William Googins married Priscilla Libby Prescott (1848–1886) – a descendant of many royal families. Their union produced six children;

- Maude Lucy (1869–?) Maude modeled for some of Winslow Homer's paintings.
- Roswell Sumner (1871–1966)
- Charlotte Hannah (1873–1965)
- Lawrence Melville (1877–1900) Died in the Boxer Rebellion
- Helen Mildred (1878–1971)
- Priscilla May (1886–1887)

== Medal of Honor ==
After being ordered to the rear for muster out, over 300 men of the 27th Maine Regiment agreed to remain beyond their service time in the defenses of Washington, D.C., during the Gettysburg campaign. The lack of an agreeable list of those who stayed behind in Washington resulted in all members of the Regiment controversially receiving the Medal of Honor. In 1917 the U.S. Congress purged these medals.

== See also ==
- List of Medal of Honor recipients

== Bibliography ==
- Pullen, John J. (1997). A Shower of Stars: The Medal of Honor and the 27th Maine (illustrated ed.). Stackpole Books. ISBN 0-8117-0075-5.
