= Hiram Gregory Berry =

Union Army general

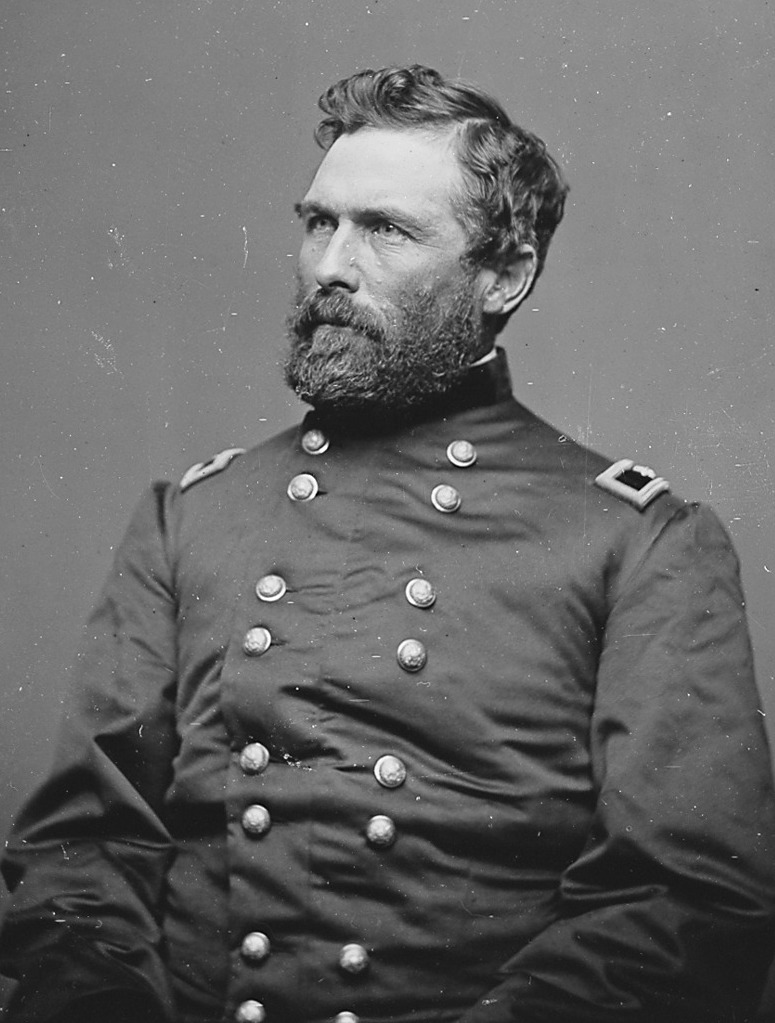
- Hiram Gregory Berry
- Born: August 27, 1824; East Thomaston (now Rockland), Maine
- Died: May 3, 1863 (aged 38); Chancellorsville, Virginia
- Burial place: Achorn Cemetery, Rockland, Maine
- Military career
- Allegiance: United States of America
- Branch: United States Army; Union Army
- Service years: 1861–1863
- Rank: Major General
- Commands: 4th Maine Volunteer Infantry Regiment; 3rd Brigade, 2nd Division, III Corps; 2nd Division, III Corps
- Conflicts: American Civil War; First Battle of Bull Run; Battle of Williamsburg; Battle of Seven Pines; Battle of Chancellorsville †

Hiram Gregory Berry (August 27, 1824 – May 3, 1863) was an American politician and general in the Army of the Potomac during the American Civil War.

== Birth and early years ==
Hiram Gregory Berry was born on August 27, 1824, on his parents' farm in the Meadows of Thomaston (now the City of Rockland), Maine. He was the fourth child of Frances Gregory Berry and Jeremiah Berry. He had 3 brothers and one sister.

Hiram G. Berry was born in Rockland, Maine, where he worked as a carpenter and a navigator. He served several terms in the State Legislature and subsequently became the mayor of Rockland. He also originated and commanded the "Rockland Guard," a volunteer militia company, which held a reputation for drill and discipline.

On April 21, 1852, Hiram co-founded the Rockland Steam Manufacturing Company along with I. K. Kimball, A. H. Kimball, and Joseph C. Libby. The company created doors, sashes, and blinds. Its buildings, however, caught fire in 1855 and were destroyed.

After being elected on October 8, 1853, Berry was a director of the Lime Rock National Bank in Rockland. On October 19, 1857, after its president Knott Crockett died, he assumed presidency of the bank. He resigned from his position to enter the army on June 5, 1861.

== Civil War service ==
At the beginning of the Civil War, he went to Augusta and offered his services to the Governor and was given orders to recruit a regiment.". He participated in the First Battle of Manassas under the command of O.O. Howard. For his gallant service at Bull Run he was promoted to brigadier general in March 1862.

Berry was reassigned to the command of the 3rd Brigade of Hamilton's Division (later Kearny's), 3rd Corps. The 3rd Brigade consisted of four regiments: the 2nd Michigan Volunteer Infantry Regiment; 3rd Michigan Volunteer Infantry Regiment, 5th Michigan Volunteer Infantry Regiment and the 37th New York Volunteer Infantry Regiment. Berry's decisive action at the Battle of Williamsburg benefited General Hooker. His brigade fought in the Battle of Seven Pines and the Seven Days Battles around Richmond. Berry was then promoted to Major-General on November 29, 1862.

Berry was placed in command of the 2nd Division of the III Corps, succeeding Major General Daniel Sickles, who had ascended to corps command.

Berry was killed by a sharpshooter's round at 7:26 am (Gould, Edward (1899), Major-General Hiram G. Berry, page 267) on May 3, 1863, during the Battle of Chancellorsville. Next in seniority was Brigadier General Gershom Mott, who was severely wounded; therefore, Joseph Warren Revere assumed command of Berry's Division, though Revere's poor decisions led to his court-martial.

== See also ==
- List of American Civil War generals (Union)
