= Maine in the American Civil War =

Flag of the 20th Maine Volunteer Infantry Regiment in the war.

As a fervently abolitionist and strongly Republican state, Maine contributed a higher proportion of its citizens to the Union armies than any other, as well as supplying money, equipment and stores. No land battles were fought in Maine. The only episode was the Battle of Portland Harbor (1863) that saw a Confederate raiding party thwarted in its attempt to capture a revenue cutter.

Abraham Lincoln chose Maine's Hannibal Hamlin as his first Vice President. The future General Joshua L. Chamberlain and the 20th Maine Volunteer Infantry Regiment played a key role at the Battle of Gettysburg, and the 1st Maine Heavy Artillery Regiment lost more men in a single charge during the siege of Petersburg than any Union regiment in the war.

== Maine's contributors ==
Maine was so eager for the cause that it ended up contributing a larger number of combatants, in proportion to its population than any other Union state. About 80,000 men from Maine served in the U.S. military as soldiers and sailors. They were organized into 32 infantry and two cavalry regiments, and seven light artillery batteries and one heavy artillery regiment. Hundreds of civilians served as nurses, doctors, relief workers, and agents at home and on the field of battle. Many served in the United States Sanitary Commission or United States Christian Commission, as well as similar organizations. According to a letter by Walter Stone Poor, a Union soldier from Maine, his reason for fighting for the Union in the war was to end slavery, a cause he stated he would gladly give his life for:

What a splendid cause is this on which we are engaged. I think it is the grandest that ever enlisted the sympathies of man. Nobler even than the Revolution for they fought for their freedom while we fight for that of another race. I firmly believe that the doom of slavery is fixed and if it is not wholly rooted out by the present war, measures will be taken to wipe it out forever. If such an event can be consummated by any sacrifice of mine, it shall be cheerfully made. I could die for this as readily as I could lie down to rest at the close of a day of wearisome toil. Men have called this age dull. They can do so no more ... War is bad, heaven knows, but slavery is far worse. If the doom of slavery is not sealed by the war, I shall curse the day I entered the Army, or lifted a finger in the preservation of the Union. Of the old Union we have had enough and more than enough.

— Walter Stone Poor, letter to George Fox (May 15, 1861), emphasis added.

=== The homefront ===
Reconstruction of a unique American flag flown in Tremont, c.1863, per description

During the early part of the war, several vocal abolitionist organizations kept the issue of slavery in the public eye. Newspaper editors informed the populace of the conduct and outcome of the war efforts. Maine factories produced ships, naval stores, and supplies, army equipment, tents, etc.

Thomas Lincoln Casey oversaw the state's coastal fortifications including forts McClary and Preble. He completed the massive Fort Knox on the Penobscot River.

No Civil War land battles were fought in Maine, but anti-Confederate passions were inflamed in June 1863 when Southern raiders triggered the Battle of Portland Harbor after seizing a revenue cutter and trying to escape to the ocean.

== Notable leaders from Maine ==
=== Political ===
Hannibal Hamlin of Paris, Maine, was Lincoln's vice-president during his first term. A strong orator and opponent of slavery, he urged both the issuance of the Emancipation Proclamation and the arming of African Americans. He became aligned with Radical Republicans, which may have caused him to be dropped from the ticket in 1864.

Augusta newspaperman and U.S. Congressman James G. Blaine was a powerful voice on Capitol Hill and dominated post-war politics during the Reconstruction period. The Fourteenth Amendment to the United States Constitution was substantially Blaine's proposition, and later he was the 1884 Republican nominee for president.

=== Union Army ===
More than two dozen men from Maine served in the Union army as generals, and dozens more Mainers led brigades at one time or another as colonels. The highest-ranking officer was Maj. Gen. Oliver O. Howard of Leeds, who commanded the XI Corps in several major battles, including Chancellorsville and Gettysburg. He had lost an arm at the Battle of Seven Pines during the 1862 Peninsula Campaign. In the fall of 1863, Howard and his corps were transferred to the Western Theater to join the Army of the Cumberland in Tennessee. In the Battle of Chattanooga, Howard's corps helped capture Missionary Ridge and force the retreat of Gen. Braxton Bragg. In July 1864, Howard became commander of the Army of the Tennessee and fought in the Atlanta campaign. He led the right wing of Maj. Gen. William T. Sherman's forces in the famous March to the Sea and the subsequent Carolinas campaign.

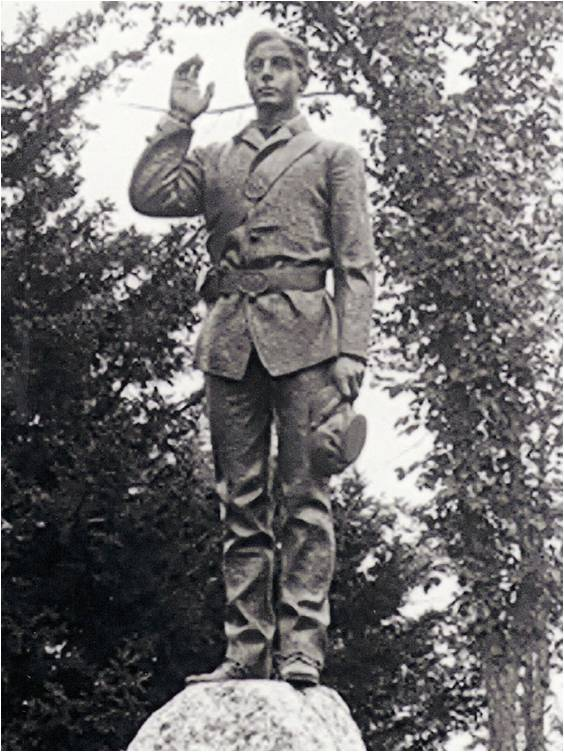
Union private Daniel A. Bean of Brownfield, Maine, 11th Maine Volunteer Infantry Regiment by John Wilson

Perhaps the most widely known officer from Maine to today's generation is Brewer native Joshua Lawrence Chamberlain, whose exploits in defending Little Round Top during the July 1863 Battle of Gettysburg were celebrated in the book Killer Angels and the corresponding 1993 film Gettysburg. His subordinate officers, including Ellis Spear and Holman S. Melcher, and the men of the 20th Maine successfully repulsed a series of charges made by Alabama troops of the Confederate Army of Northern Virginia. Earlier in the war, the 20th had been led by Adelbert Ames of Rockland. The son of a sea captain, Ames rose at Gettysburg to command of a division. He led the successful assault in the Second Battle of Fort Fisher (commanding the 2nd Division, XXIV Corps), accompanying his men into the formidable coastal fortress as most of his staff were shot down by Confederate snipers.

Other notable generals from Maine included George Lafayette Beal of Norway, who led a brigade in the Red River Campaign and the Valley Campaigns of 1864. He was promoted to general for gallant service at the Battle of Cedar Creek, where his brigade broke the Confederate lines during the turning point of the battle. Hiram Berry of Rockland was killed at Chancellorsville while leading his 2nd Division of the III Corps in a bayonet charge. James G. Blunt, a fiery abolitionist born in Trenton, won a victory at the Battle of Honey Springs, bringing much of the Indian Territory into Union control. In 1864, Blunt's division inflicted the final defeat to Sterling Price at the Second Battle of Newtonia, ending Price's Missouri Raid.

Hiram Burnham of Narraguagus was killed while assaulting Confederate positions near Richmond, Virginia, during the Battle of Chaffin's Farm. Lowell's John C. Caldwell led a division in the Army of the Potomac at Gettysburg in the fighting in the Wheatfield. Aaron S. Daggett of Greene was the last surviving Union Civil War general when he died in 1938 at the age of 100. Neal Dow of Portland led a brigade during the Federal capture and occupation of New Orleans and later commanded the District of Florida.

Brothers Francis and James Fessenden, members of a prominent Maine political family, were both generals in the Union Army. Cuvier Grover of Bethel commanded a division in the XIX Corps during the capture of Baton Rouge and the siege of Port Hudson. Hampden's Cyrus Hamlin led a brigade of black troops at Port Hudson and in other engagements. Albion P. Howe of Standish commanded 2nd Division of the VI Corps at Fredericksburg, Chancellorsville, and Gettysburg. Rufus Ingalls of Denmark, Maine, was the Quartermaster General of the Army of the Potomac and later of all armies operating during the sieges of Richmond and Petersburg. He built up the huge supply depot at City Point, Virginia.

Erasmus D. Keyes of Kennebec County commanded the IV Corps of Army of the Potomac during the first half of the war. Augusta's Seth Williams was assistant adjutant general of the Army of the Potomac and later was inspector general on the staff of Ulysses S. Grant. At Appomattox Court House in April 1865, he carried Grant's message offering to accept Robert E. Lee's surrender to the Confederate lines and later delivered Grant's terms to the Confederate Army of Northern Virginia.

Danville Leadbetter, born in Leeds, cast his lot with the Confederacy and became a general in its army.

Others, including William Googins of Old Orchard Beach, and John F. Chase of Chelsea, Maine served as private soldiers.

=== Union Navy ===
James Alden Jr. of Portland commanded the steam sloop USS Brooklyn in the action with Fort Gaines and Fort Morgan and with the Confederate gunboats in the Battle of Mobile Bay. Henry K. Thatcher of Thomaston commanded the West Gulf Blockading Squadron in a combined arms action against Mobile, which surrendered April 12, 1865.

== See also ==
- Maine Units in the Civil War
- People of Maine in the American Civil War
- History of Maine
- New Hampshire in the American Civil War
- Union (American Civil War)
