= Columbia Falls Air Force Station =

Closed US Air Force radar station in Washington County, Maine

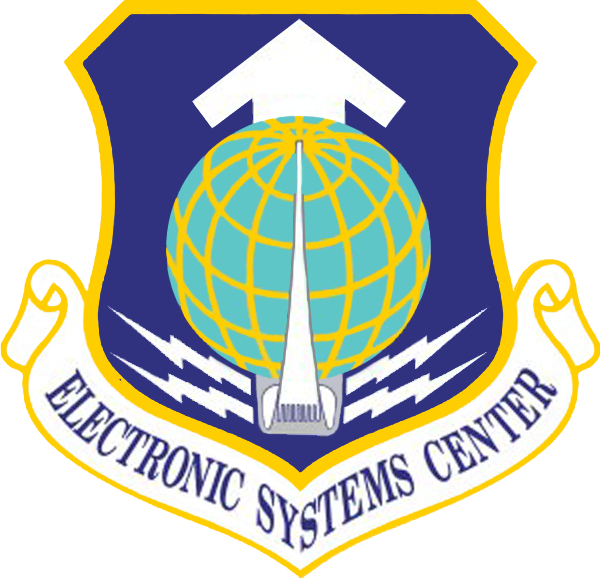
Columbia Falls Air Force Station
- Part of Electronic Systems Division; Air Force Materiel Command (AFMC)

Site information
- Type: Air Force Station
- Controlled by: United States Air Force
- Condition: cold storage / deactivated

Location
- Location of Columbia Falls AFS, Maine
- Coordinates: 44°47′42″N 067°48′41″W

Site history
- Built: 1980s
- Built by: GE Aerospace
- In use: 1970s-1990s
- Materials: AN/FPS-118 Rx over-the-horizon backscatter radar array

Garrison information
- Garrison: 776 Radar Squadron

Columbia Falls Air Force Station is a closed United States Air Force radar station in Washington County, Maine. Located 16.0 miles (25.7 km) northwest of Machias, Maine and 10.0 miles (16.1 km) north of Columbia Falls, it went operational in 1990 but was closed in 1997 and placed in "warm storage" with minimal maintenance. It was deactivated and placed in "cold storage" in 2002.

== History ==
Development of Columbia Falls AFS can be traced to work undertaken by USAF engineers in the early 1970s who were developing an Over-the-horizon radar (OTH-B) system. The system was based on a frequency modulation/continuous wave (FM/CW) radar capable of detecting and tracking objects at over-the-horizon ranges. In concept it involved bouncing radar signals off the ionosphere which allows radar to overcome the curvature of the Earth.

The first, most northernmost 60 degree sector of coverage was built as the OTH-B Experimental Radar System (ERS). At that time the operations were conducted at the receive site at Columbia Falls AFS. The system was bi-static, with the transmitter being located at Moscow Air Force Station. System and Initial Operational testing was conducted from June 1980 to June 1981. Successful testing resulted in the decision to develop operational OTH-B systems for the east and west coasts and in Alaska.

The east coast OTH-B system was designed and built by GE Aerospace and consisted of an AN/FPS-118 radar with the transmitter located at Moscow AFS and the receiver at the newly constructed Columbia Falls AFS. The transmitter and receiver stations were manned by personnel of the 776th Radar Squadron. Data processing took place at Maine Air National Guard's Bangor Air National Guard Base which was close to the geographic halfway point between the TX/RX facilities.

The east coast OTH-B system was tested in the late 1980s and went operational when it was handed over to USAF in 1990. It was the largest of the three OTH-B systems and was so powerful that it could even detect changes in ocean currents. Transmissions from the Moscow AFS site covered an arc from 16.5° to 76.5° and from 900 km (560 mi) to 3,300 km (2,100 mi) in range.

The fall of the Soviet Union and end of the Cold War saw the OTH-B systems rendered obsolete for detecting intruding military aircraft, however, the east coast OTH-B continued operations until 1997 and its data saw use by the United States Border Patrol for tracking aircraft used by drug smugglers, as well as the National Oceanic and Atmospheric Administration which made use of the measurements of ocean currents and weather patterns.

The facility was placed in "warm storage" in 1997 and in 2002 it was deactivated and placed in "cold storage" with equipment removed from the site.
