= Maine–Montenegro National Guard Partnership =

Maine-Montenegro State Partnership
- Part of the U.S. European Command State Partnership Program
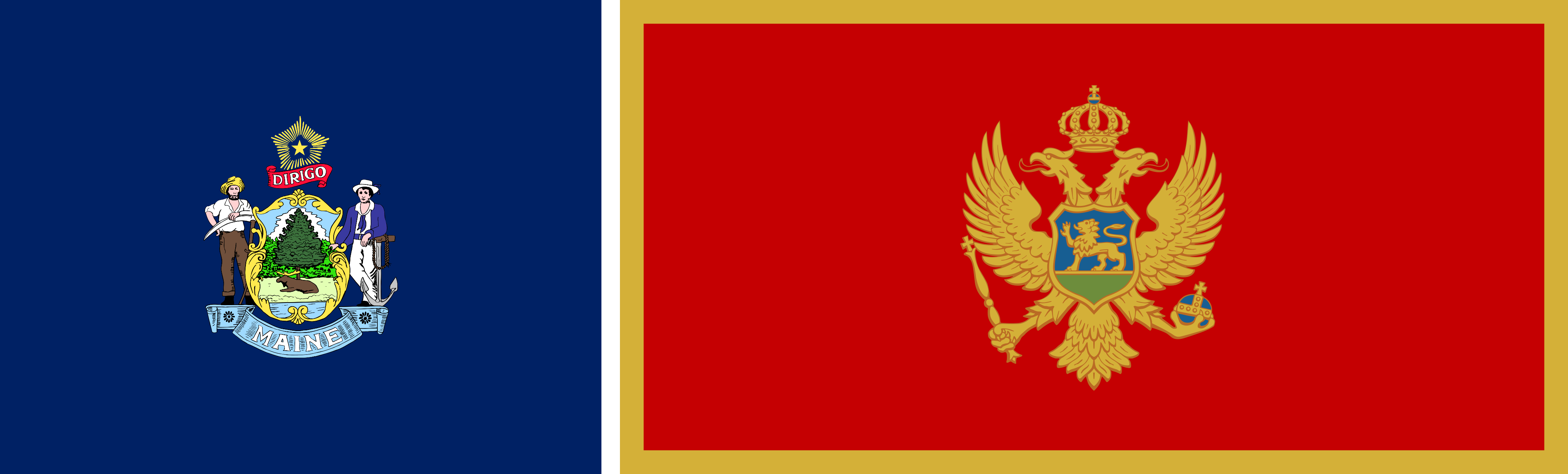
- Origin: 20 November 2006
- Country president: Filip Vujanović
- Prime minister: Duško Marković
- Minister of defense: Predrag Bošković
- Ambassador to U.S.: Srdjan Darmanović
- Ambassador to Montenegro: Margaret Uyehara
- Adjutant general: Maj Gen Douglas A. Farnham
- 2012 Engagements: 8
- NATO member: Yes (2017)
- EU member: No

The Maine–Montenegro National Guard Partnership is one of 25 European partnerships that make up the U.S. European Command State Partnership Program and one of 88 worldwide partnerships that make-up the National Guard State Partnership Program. Montenegro signed a bilateral affairs agreement with the U.S. Department of Defense and the state of Maine in 2006 establishing the Maine-Montenegro State Partnership Program.

The partnership aims to develop self-sustaining relationships between the Montenegrin Ministry of Defense and the Maine National Guard as well as various civilian organizations in order to exchange knowledge in areas such as emergency management and disaster response, border and port security, economic security, peacekeeping operations and counter terrorism.

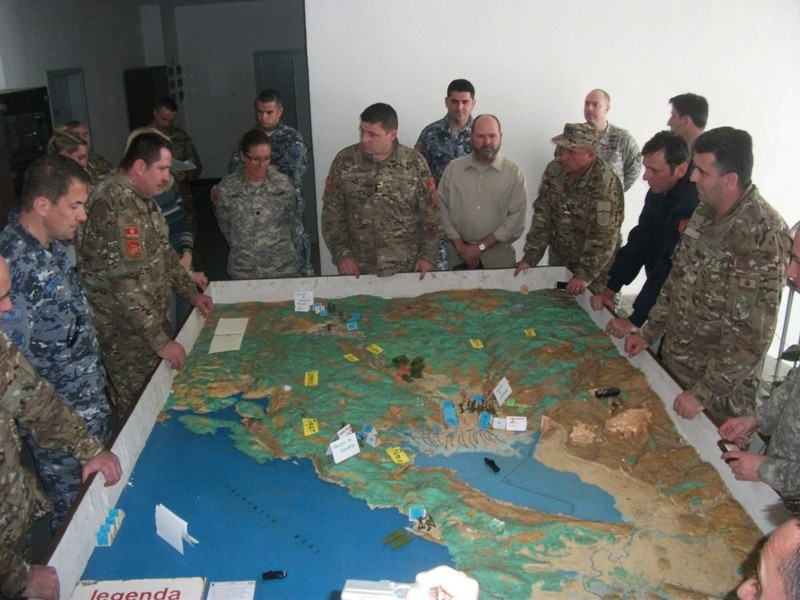
Members of the Maine National Guard and the Military of Montenegro participate in a State Partnership Program event on 20 March 2014 focused on the Military Decision Making Process of logistics units.

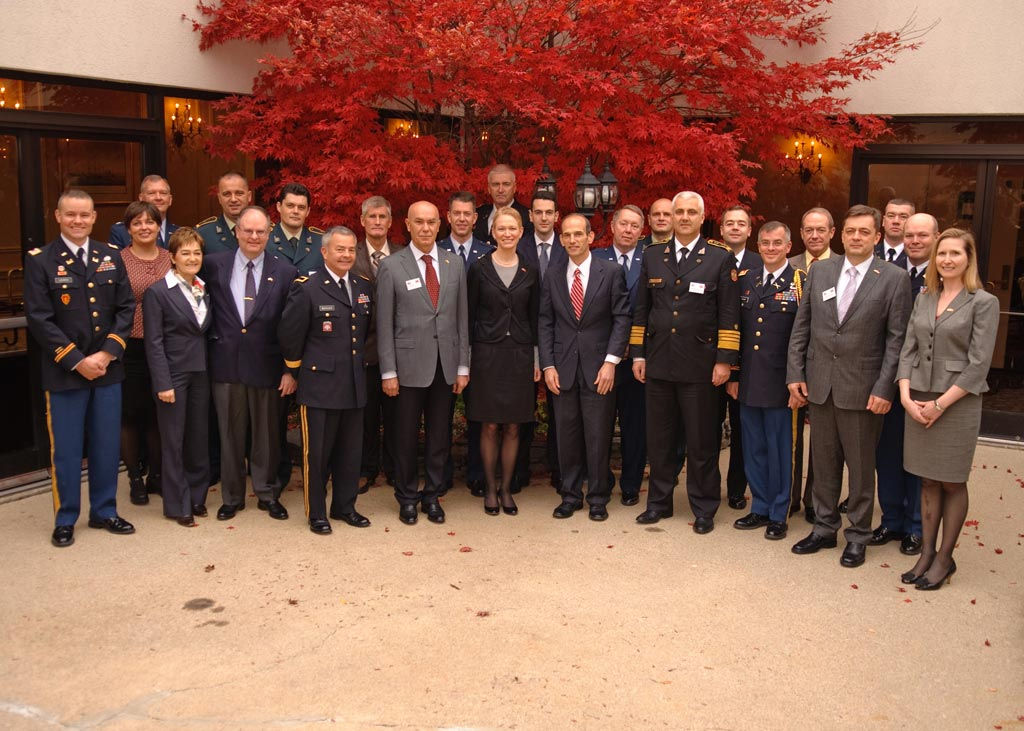
Group photo at the 15 November 2010 bilateral defense consultation. This meeting defined upcoming events in the development of the Montenegrin armed forces.

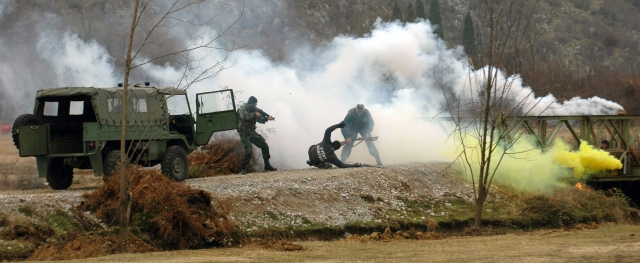
Members of the Montenegrin Special Forces participate in a tactical capabilities demonstration at the Danilovgrad Training Center in Montenegro for Maine National Guard leaders.

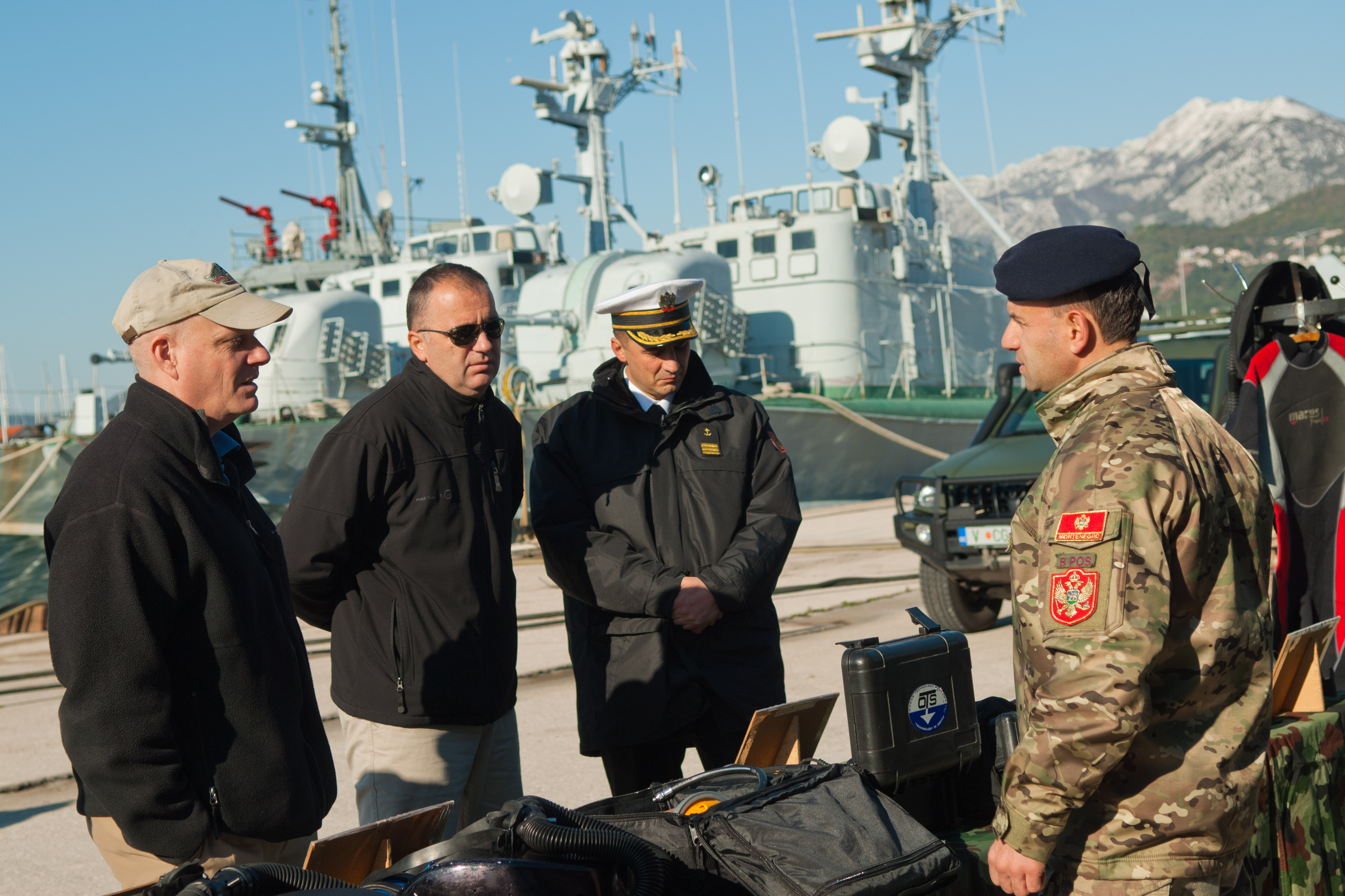
Brig. Gen. James Campbell, adjutant general for the Maine Army National Guard examines one of the recently acquired weapons for the Montenegrin Naval Forces.

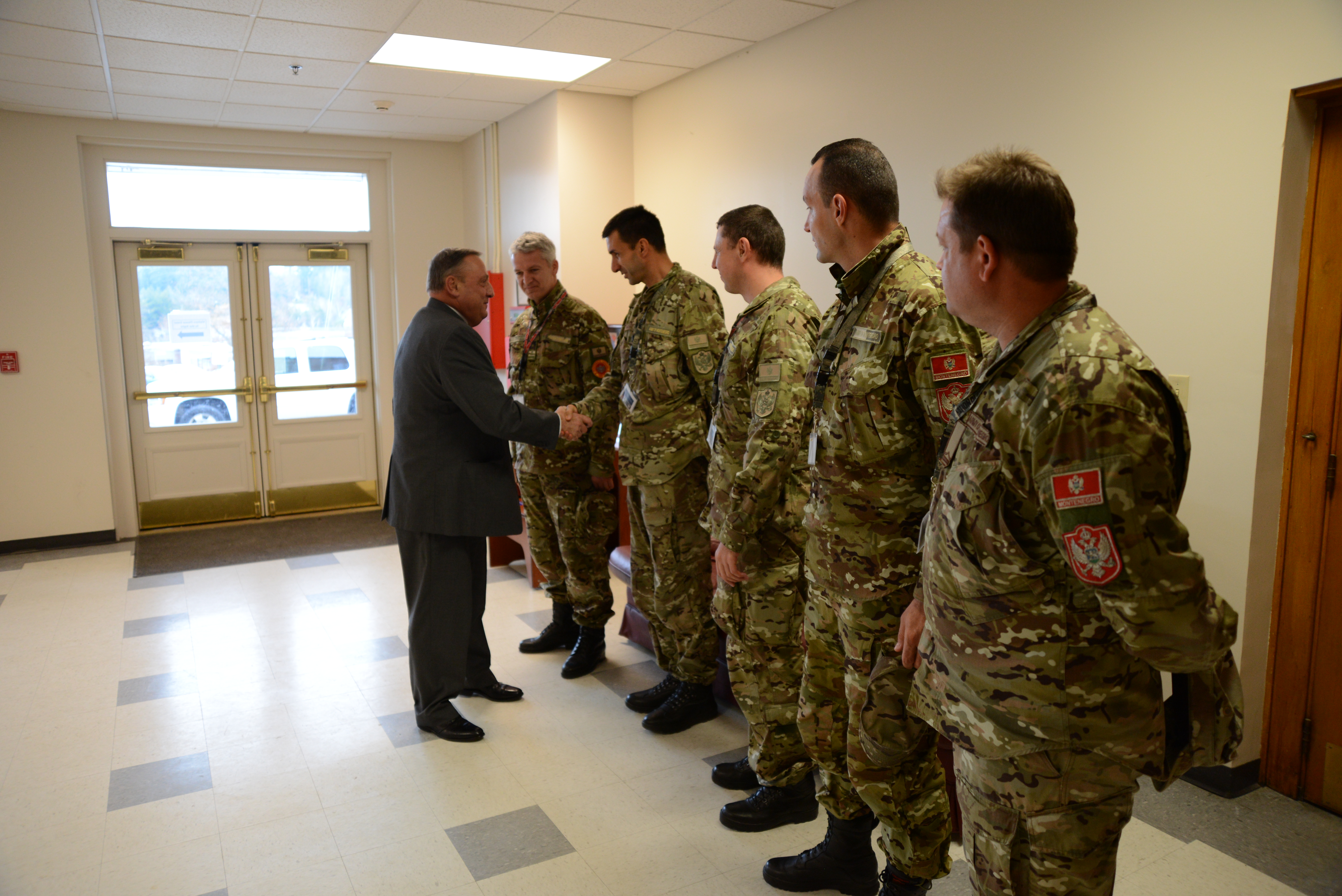
5 members of the Montenegrin Military's cyber defense team meet Maine Governor Paul LePage on 7 November 2013 during the Vigilant Guard 14 Exercise. The large-scale event tested local, state, and federal disaster response capabilities from chemical defense to crowd control to cyber defense.

== History ==
"We're [Maine/Montenegro] very similar states in many respects and both of us have significant coastlines, significant industries and a wide spectrum of possible cooperation and partnership." - MG John Libby, former Adjutant General, Maine National Guard.

Overview:

- State Partnership was established 20 NOV 06.
- Montenegro is a candidate for EU membership, member of the UN, a NATO partner and participating in a NATO Membership Action Plan for full NATO membership.
- The military is composed of land, naval, and air forces with a Special Forces component. It continues to provide 6-month ISAF Security Platoon rotations, small individual ISAF support missions and military observer mission in Liberia.
- Montenegro seeks to participate in more peacekeeping missions under UN and NATO after military modernization and reorganization.
- The government is a parliamentary democracy, led by a prime minister, with a president as head-of-state. It is working to improve social justice and rule of law. Constitution was approved on 22 Oct 07.

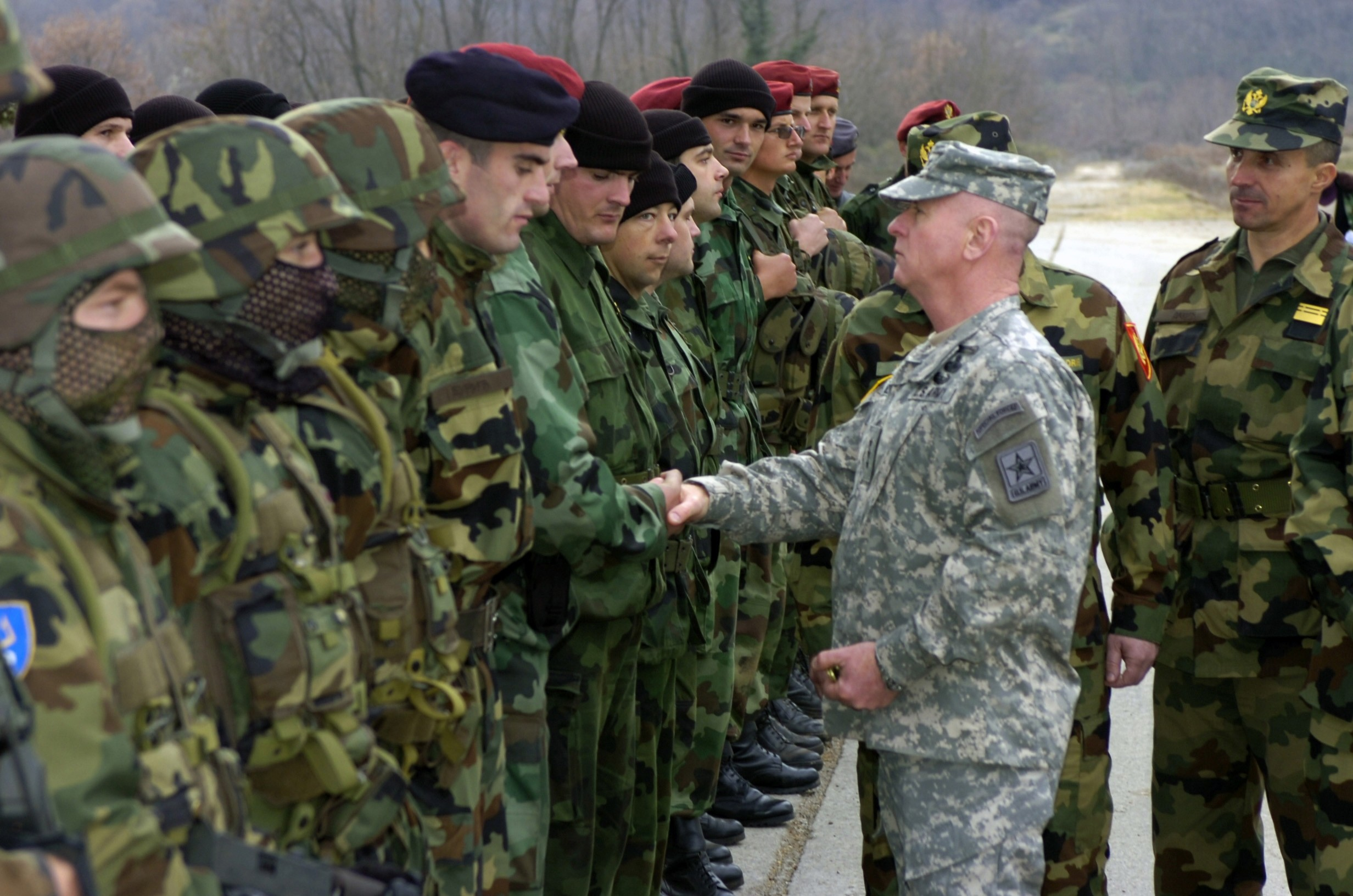
LTG Blum greets members of the Montenegrin Special Forces after their tactical capabilities demonstration at the Danilovgrad Training Center in Montenegro.

On June 3, 2006, Montenegro declared its independence from Serbia and Montenegro, which was formerly part of Yugoslavia until its collapse in 1992. The Maine-Montenegro State Partnership was established a few months later for the purpose of fostering security cooperation between the United States and Montenegro and to support the objectives of the Supreme Headquarters Allied Powers Europe. Ultimately, Montenegro sought NATO membership and saw the SPP as the best possible route to achieving that goal. "They truly want to be part of the Euro-Atlantic community. They absolutely are desirous of being members of NATO, and they see the State Partnership Program being what they consider a fast-track for that," said LTG Blum, then Chief of the National Guard Bureau.

News of the partnership with the United States and the visit by National Guard leaders in December 2006 dominated evening news broadcasts and newspaper front pages in Montenegro. It was widely reported that the partnership offered numerous benefits to Montenegro, including emergency management, English language training for Montenegrin soldiers, officer and noncommissioned officer development, civilian student exchanges and the transformation of the Montenegrin military to an all-volunteer force.

Each year, Maine and Montenegro conduct numerous joint exercises in both locations that span across educational, law enforcement, medical, military, and emergency preparedness endeavors. Within the framework of the Ambassador's Mission Strategic Plan and EUCOM's Theater Security Strategy, the Maine-Montenegro Partnership strengthens bilateral security relationships, enhances partner capacity and promotes effective civil-military relations.

In 2012, Maine and Montenegro conducted eight SPP events, including infantry tactics, extreme climate operations, medical and flight operations, predeployment preparation and others.

On December 10, 2012, military leadership from Maine and Montenegro met in Montenegro to review their progress over the last six years and to discuss the future of their partnership.

== Partnership focus ==
Maine will continue to support Membership Action Plan goals and develop events that support Defense Support to Civilian Authorities and other ISAF preparation related missions.

Military to Military (M2M):

- Prepare Montenegrin participants to participate in Vigilant Guard ’14.
- Develop reverse/co-deployment opportunities, as appropriate
- Move to collective-level training, using MEANG KC-135 for airlift

Interagency (Domestic Operations):

- Management of large-scale disasters through DSCA/CMEP
- Possible Marine Patrol focus on security, navigation, harbor pollution and related issues

Corollary (Civilian Initiatives):

- Continue to build educational, cultural and economic relations to include: Forest Management, Parks and Recreation and Maritime Studies
- Continue to work to develop university interaction and student and faculty exchanges between Maine and Montenegro
