= Moscow Air Force Station =

Closed US Air Force radar station in Somerset County, Maine

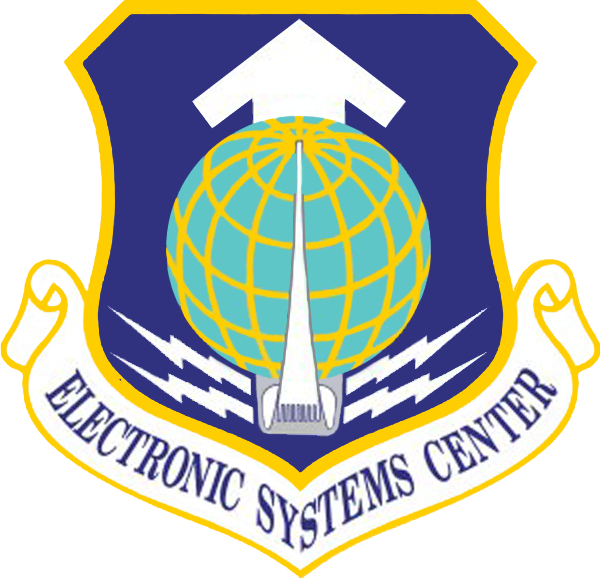
Moscow Air Force Station
- Part of Electronic Systems Division; Air Force Materiel Command (AFMC)

Site information
- Type: Air Force Station
- Controlled by: United States Air Force
- Condition: cold storage / deactivated

Location
- Location of Moscow AFS, Maine
- Coordinates: 45°08′14″N 069°48′07″W

Site history
- Built: 1970s
- Built by: GE Aerospace
- In use: 1970s-1990s
- Materials: AN/FPS-118 Tx over-the-horizon backscatter radar array

Garrison information
- Garrison: 776 Radar Squadron

Moscow Air Force Station is a closed United States Air Force radar station in Somerset County, Maine. Located 6.0 miles (9.7 km) northeast of Moscow, Maine, it went operational in 1990 but was closed in 1997 and placed in "warm storage" with minimal maintenance. It was deactivated and placed in "cold storage" in 2002.

== History ==
Development of Moscow AFS can be traced to work undertaken by USAF Rome Air Development Center [RADC] engineers in the early 1970s who were developing an over the horizon backscatter radar (OTH-B) system. The system was based on a frequency modulation/continuous wave (FM/CW) radar capable of detecting and tracking objects at over-the-horizon ranges. In concept it involved bouncing radar signals off the ionosphere which allows radar to overcome the curvature of the Earth.

A small scale test receiver/transmitter was established in central western Maine at what would become Moscow AFS by the early 1980s. Successful testing resulted in the decision to develop operational OTH-B systems for the east and west coasts and in Alaska.

The east coast OTH-B system was designed and built by GE Aerospace and consisted of an AN/FPS-118 radar with the transmitter located at Moscow AFS and the receiver at the newly constructed Columbia Falls AFS. The transmitter and receiver stations were staffed by personnel of the 776th Radar Squadron. Data processing took place at the Maine Air National Guard's Bangor Air National Guard Base which was close to the geographic halfway point between the TX/RX facilities.

The east coast OTH-B system was tested in the late 1980s and went operational when it was handed over to USAF in 1990. It was the largest of the three OTH-B systems and was so powerful that it could even detect changes in ocean currents.

The fall of the Soviet Union and end of the Cold War saw the OTH-B systems rendered obsolete for detecting intruding military aircraft, however, the east coast OTH-B continued operations until 1997 and its data saw use by the United States Border Patrol for tracking aircraft used by drug smugglers, as well as the National Oceanic and Atmospheric Administration which made use of the measurements of ocean currents and weather patterns.

The facility was placed in "warm storage" in 1997 and in 2002 it was deactivated and placed in "cold storage" with equipment removed from the site. Reports in 2010 indicate that the Moscow AFS property may be divested and sold for a private wind farm development. The site was put up for auction in September 2011 through the U.S. General Services Administration. By October 2011, the arrays had been dismantled and removed from the deactivated station, but microwave towers and various buildings remained. The site was finally sold in late 2011 for approximately US$750,000.
