= Bodwell =

Bodwell may refer to:

- Bodwell Water Power Company Plant
- Bodwell High School
- Bodwell (surname)
- The Bodwell Family - for additional information see family page.
