= Milford Congregational Church =

Historic church in Maine, United States

- U.S. National Register of Historic Places
- Location within Maine Location within the United States
- Location: Main and Ferry Sts., Milford, Maine
- Coordinates: 44°56′48″N 68°38′45″W
- Area: less than one acre
- Built: 1883
- Architect: Wing, Asa T.
- Architectural style: Queen Anne, Romanesque
- NRHP reference No.: 89000841
- Added to NRHP: July 13, 1989

The Milford Congregational Church is a historic church on Main and Ferry Streets in Milford, Maine. Built 1883–85, this Queen Anne Victorian structure is one of the most architecturally sophisticated buildings in the small town. It was listed on the National Register of Historic Places in 1989.

== Description and history ==
The Milford Congregational Church is located at the northwest corner of Ferry Street and Main Street (United States Route 2), near the northern edge of the town's village center. It is a roughly rectangular 1 1/2-story wood-frame structure, with a square tower at its southeastern corner. Its exterior is finished in a variety of clapboarding and cut wood shingles typical of the Queen Anne period. A modern addition extends to the west (along Ferry Street). The east facade has a large stained-glass round-arch window, with the entrance set at the base of the tower to the left. The tower has buttress forms on its south side, and a second stage with half-round windows, above which is a belfry stage with paired round-arch openings, topped by a pyramidal roof.

The local church was organized in 1880, with services conducted by a pastor from Old Town. Land was acquired for the church in 1883, with construction taking two years due to financial constraints. The architect is unknown; the contractor was Asa T. Wing of Old Town, and the stained glass was provided by David T. Welch of Portland. The present vestry portion of the building was probably built before the rest, and was used prior to the construction of the remainder.

== See also ==
- National Register of Historic Places listings in Penobscot County, Maine
