= Milford Air Force Auxiliary Airfield =

Coordinates: 44°58′28.32″N 68°27′30.94″W

Milford Air Force Auxiliary Airfield was an auxiliary airfield of the United States Army Air Forces that was located in Milford, Penobscot County, Maine.

== History ==
It operated from 1942 to 1948, when the Deblois Bombing Range opened nearby. It was originally constructed for the Bangor Precision Bombing Range, and was also used by Dow Army Airfield.

After its closure, the site was used by Dow Air Force Base personnel for a survival school.

== See also ==
- Airfields of the United States Army Air Forces in Maine
