= Milford (CDP), Maine =

Milford, Maine
- Census-designated place
- Location within Maine Location within the United States
- Coordinates: 44°57′07″N 68°37′45″W
- Country: United States
- State: Maine
- County: Penobscot

Area
  - Total: 3.38 sq mi (8.76 km^{2})
  - Land: 3.34 sq mi (8.66 km^{2})
  - Water: 0.042 sq mi (0.11 km^{2})
- Elevation: 125 ft (38 m)

Population (2020)
  - Total: 2,211
  - Density: 661.5/sq mi (255.39/km^{2})
- Time zone: UTC-5 (Eastern (EST))
  - Summer (DST): UTC-4 (EDT)
- ZIP code: 04461
- Area code: 207
- FIPS code: 23-45635
- GNIS feature ID: 2377937

Milford is a census-designated place (CDP) consisting of the main area of settlement within the town of Milford in Penobscot County, Maine, United States. The population was 2,233 at the 2010 census.

== Geography ==
According to the United States Census Bureau, the CDP has a total area of 3.4 square miles (8.8 km^{2}), of which 3.4 square miles (8.7 km^{2}) is land and 0.039 square miles (0.1 km^{2}), or 1.20%, is water.

== Demographics ==
Historical population
Census	Pop.	Note	%±
2020	2,211		—
U.S. Decennial Census

As of the census of 2000, there were 2,197 people, 906 households, and 587 families residing in the CDP. The population density was 681.0 inhabitants per square mile (262.9/km^{2}). There were 955 housing units at an average density of 296.0 per square mile (114.3/km^{2}). The racial makeup of the CDP was 95.72% White, 0.14% Black or African American, 1.64% Native American, 0.55% Asian, 0.05% Pacific Islander, 0.41% from other races, and 1.50% from two or more races. Hispanic or Latino of any race were 0.64% of the population.

There were 906 households, out of which 30.1% had children under the age of 18 living with them, 51.0% were married couples living together, 10.6% had a female householder with no husband present, and 35.1% were non-families. 23.7% of all households were made up of individuals, and 7.7% had someone living alone who was 65 years of age or older. The average household size was 2.42 and the average family size was 2.87.

In the CDP, the population was spread out, with 22.2% under the age of 18, 12.1% from 18 to 24, 31.7% from 25 to 44, 21.7% from 45 to 64, and 12.4% who were 65 years of age or older. The median age was 36 years. For every 100 females, there were 97.6 males. For every 100 females age 18 and over, there were 93.9 males.

The median income for a household in the CDP was $36,250, and the median income for a family was $42,315. Males had a median income of $31,453 versus $25,227 for females. The per capita income for the CDP was $17,624. About 11.0% of families and 12.2% of the population were below the poverty line, including 10.3% of those under age 18 and 12.1% of those age 65 or over.
