= Maine Wing Civil Air Patrol =

- Maine Wing of Civil Air Patrol

Associated branches
- United States Air Force

Command staff
- Commander: Col Mark R. Hyland
- Deputy Commander: Lt. Col Catherine Spaulding
- Chief of Staff: Lt. Col Lewis Curtis

Current statistics
- Cadets: 170
- Seniors: 173
- Total Membership: 343
- Website: www.mewg.cap.gov
- Statistics as of 25 June 2025

The Maine Wing of Civil Air Patrol (CAP) is the highest echelon of Civil Air Patrol in the state of Maine. Maine Wing headquarters are located in Augusta, Maine. The Maine Wing consists of over 300 cadet and adult members at over 10 locations across the state of Maine.

== Mission ==
The Maine Wing of Civil Air Patrol performs the three missions of Civil Air Patrol: providing emergency services, offering cadet programs for youth, and providing aerospace education for both CAP members and the general public.

=== Emergency services ===
The Maine Wing of the performs emergency services missions, including assisting the Maine State Police in searching for missing or overdue aircraft, as well as the prosecuting of emergency distress beacons as reported by the Air Force Rescue Coordination Center. Members of the Maine Wing train to obtain Incident Command Staff, Ground Team, and Air Crew Search And Rescue (SAR) qualifications. The wing also performs aerial photography missions following natural disasters, as well as performing search and rescue missions. The wing has a Critical Incident Stress Management team used to assess members and non-members for signs of trauma or stress when responding to an emergency.

=== Cadet programs ===
Civil Air Patrol offers cadet programs for youth aged 12 to 21, which includes aerospace education, leadership training, physical fitness, and moral leadership. The Maine Wing offers an annual encampment where cadets are provided with additional training.

=== Aerospace education ===
Civil Air Patrol educates youth through cadet programs and educational material provided to teachers through the education system. Adult members may assist in providing aerospace education to cadets.

== Organization ==
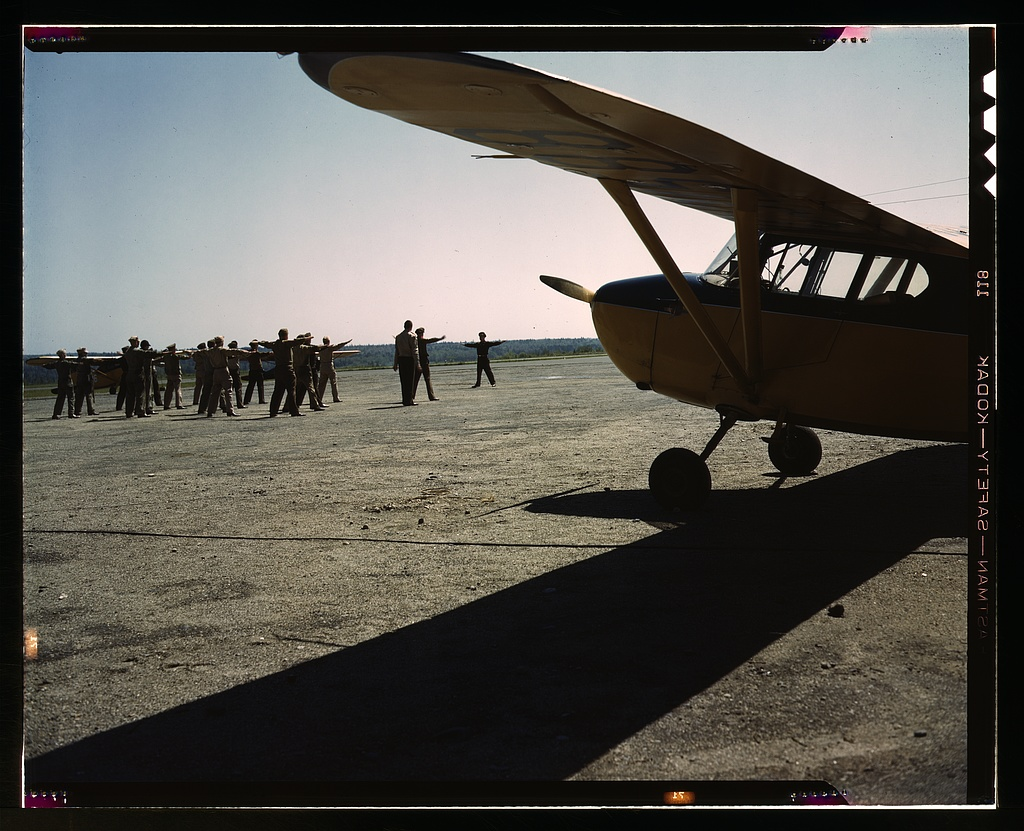
Civil Air Patrol members exercise near a CAP plane at Bar Harbor, Maine, in 1943.

Squadrons of the Maine Wing
Designation	Squadron Name	Location	Notes
ME021	21st Composite Squadron	Brunswick	
ME033	33rd Composite Squadron	Caribou	
ME035	35th Composite Squadron	Bangor	
ME036	36th Composite Squadron	Augusta	
ME038	38th Composite Squadron	Bar Harbor	
ME056	56th Composite Squadron	Waterville	
ME058	58th Composite Squadron	Portland	
ME075	75th Composite Squadron	Machias	
ME077	77th Composite Squadron	Lewiston	
ME078	78th Composite Squadron	Sanford	
ME999	Maine State Legislature Squadron	Augusta	

== See also ==
- Maine Air National Guard
- Maine State Guard
