= 776th Radar Squadron =

Inactive US Air Force unit

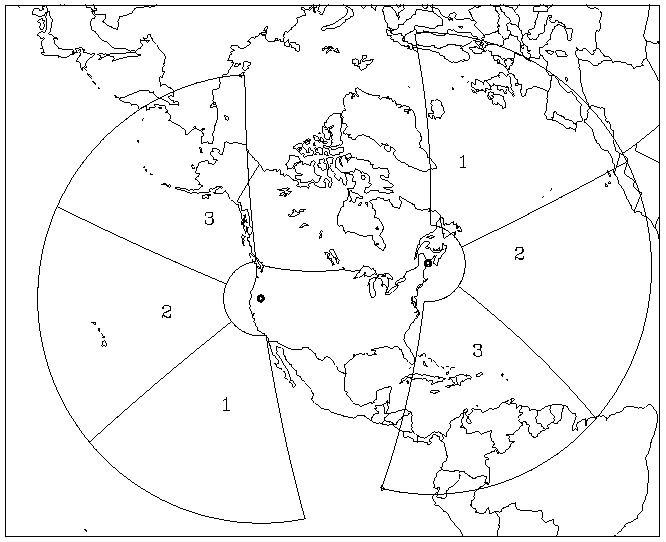
- over-the-horizon radar coverage
- Active: 1951–1980; 1985–1991
- Country: United States
- Branch: United States Air Force
- Role: Radar Surveillance
- Decorations: Air Force Outstanding Unit Award

Insignia
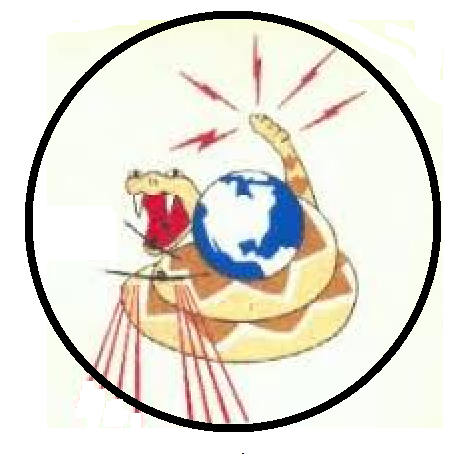
- 776th Radar Squadron emblem (Note: The rattlesnake design was approved 30 January 1955. It was later placed on a white disc outlined black.)

The 776th Radar Squadron is an inactive United States Air Force unit. It was last assigned to the Northeast Air Defense Sector, Air Combat Command, stationed at Bangor Air National Guard Base, Maine, where it was inactivated on 6 September 1991.

From 1951 to 1980, the unit was a General Surveillance Radar squadron providing for the air defense of North America. From 1985 to 1991, it operated Over The Horizion Backscatter(OTH-B) radar for Tactical Air Command.

== Lineage ==
- Constituted as the 776th Aircraft Control and Warning Squadron on 14 November 1950

Activated on 27 November 1950
Redesignated 776th Radar Squadron (SAGE), 15 January 1961
Redesignated 776th Radar Squadron on 1 February 1974
Inactivated on 30 September 1980

- Activated 1 October 1985

Inactivated 6 September 1991

=== Assignments ===
- 542d Aircraft Control and Warning Group, 27 November 1950
- 28th Air Division, 6 February 1952
- San Francisco Air Defense Sector, 1 July 1960
- Portland Air Defense Sector, 1 August 1963
- 26th Air Division, 1 April 1966
- 27th Air Division, 15 September 1969
- 26th Air Division, 19 November 1969 - 30 September 1980
- 24th Air Division 1 October 1985
- Northeast Air Defense Sector, 1 December 1987 - 6 September 1991

Stations

- Point Arena Air Force Station, California, 1 January 1951 – 30 September 1980
- Bangor Air National Guard Base, Maine, 1 October 1985 – 6 September 1991 (HQ Site)

Moscow Air Force Station, Maine (OTH-B Transmitter site)
Columbia Falls Air Force Station, Maine (OTH-B Receiver site)

== See also ==
- Over-the-horizon radar
- List of United States Air Force aircraft control and warning squadrons
