= Sunkhaze Meadows National Wildlife Refuge =

Protected area in Maine, United States

- IUCN category IV (habitat/species management area)
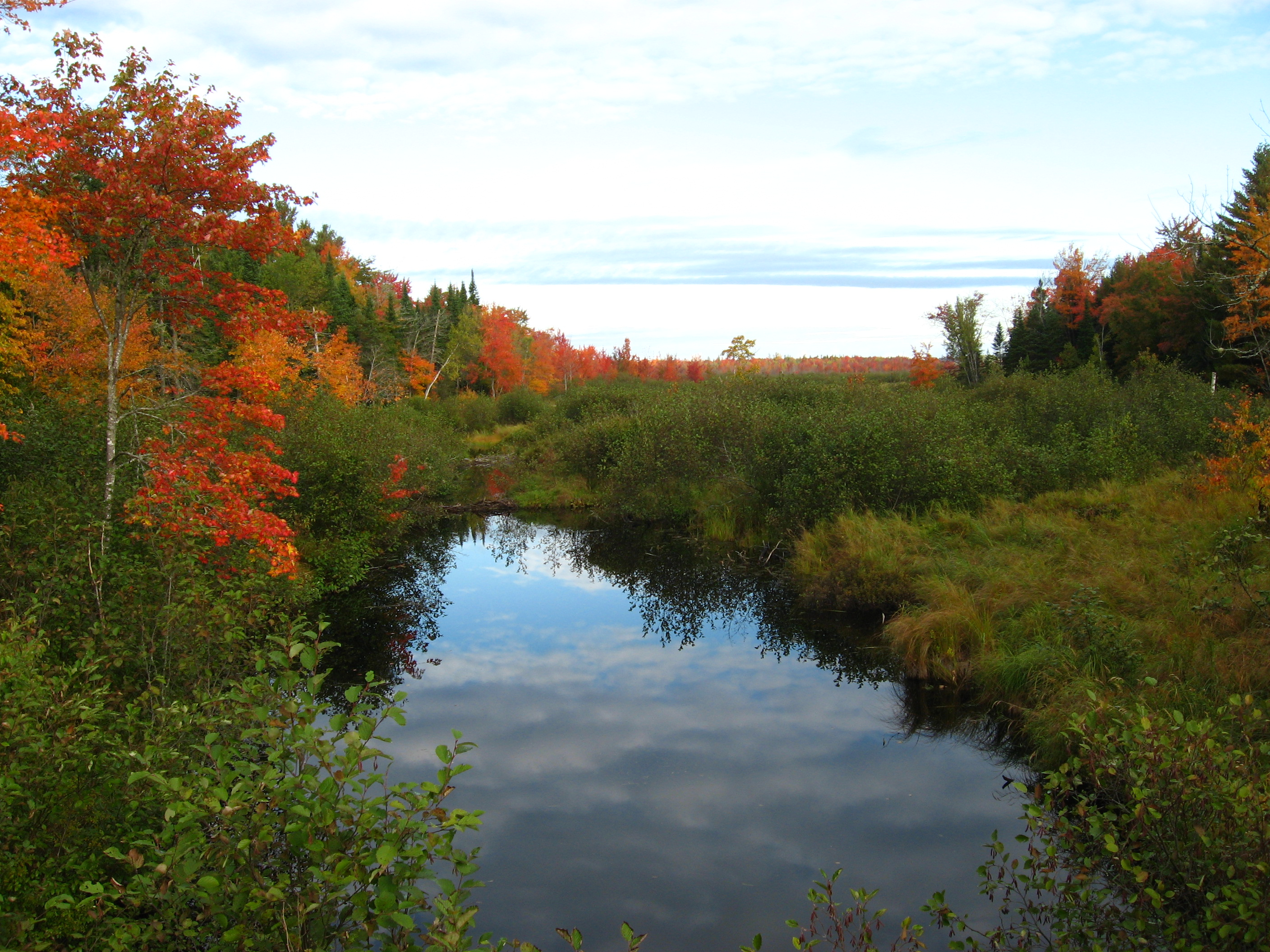

- Location within the United States
- Location: Penobscot County, Maine, United States
- Nearest city: Milford
- Coordinates: 44°59′N 68°34′W
- Area: 11,435 acres (46.28 km^{2})
- Established: 1988
- Governing body: U.S. Fish and Wildlife Service
- Website: Sunkhaze Meadows National Wildlife Refuge

Sunkhaze Meadows National Wildlife Refuge is located in the Town of Milford, Penobscot County, Maine, approximately fourteen miles north of Bangor. The refuge was established in 1988 to ensure the ecological integrity of the Sunkhaze Meadows peat bog and the continued availability of its wetland, stream, forest and wildlife resources to the citizens of the United States. The purpose of acquisition, under the authority of the Fish and Wildlife Act of 1956 was "... for the development, advancement, management, conservation, and protection of fish and wildlife resources ..". and "... for the benefit of the United States Fish and Wildlife Service, in performing its activities and services. Such acceptance may be subject to the terms of any restrictive or affirmative covenant, or condition of servitude ..". The Land and Water Conservation Fund was the source of funding for the purchase

The refuge protects the second-largest peatland in Maine. It contains several raised bogs or domes, separated from each other by extensive areas of streamside meadows. Sunkhaze Stream bisects the refuge along a northeast to southwest orientation and, with its six tributaries, creates a diversity of wetland communities. The bog and stream wetlands, along with the adjacent uplands and associated transition zones, provide important habitat for many wildlife species. The wetland complex consists primarily of wet meadows, shrub thickets, cedar swamps, extensive red and silver maple floodplain forests and open freshwater stream habitats, along with those plant communities associated with peatlands such as shrub heaths and cedar and spruce bogs.

Sunkhaze Meadows National Wildlife Refuge provides habitat for three plants, seven birds, two mollusks and three invertebrates listed as Endangered or Threatened by the State of Maine.

In the early 1990s, the Benton and Sandy Stream Divisions were added to the refuge under the auspices of the 1990 Farm Bill. These small areas are respectively located in the towns of Benton and Unity, Maine. Both are managed for grassland-nesting birds, some of which are rare in Maine.

Four conservation easements are also managed by Sunkhaze Meadows Refuge. They are the Downing, Fortin, Miller, and Quayle Easements, totaling seven separate parcels of land. Downing Easement lands are located in the towns of Corinth and Exeter. Fortin Easement lands are located in Fairfield, while lands of the Miller and Quayle Easements are located in the towns of Starks and Patten, respectively.

The refuge has a surface area of 11,435 acres (46.28 km^{2}).

The 3.5-mile long Johnson Brook Trail within the refuge was designated a National Recreation Trail in 2016.
