= Bangor Air National Guard Base =

US Air National Guard base in Bangor, Maine

- Bangor, Maine in United States of America
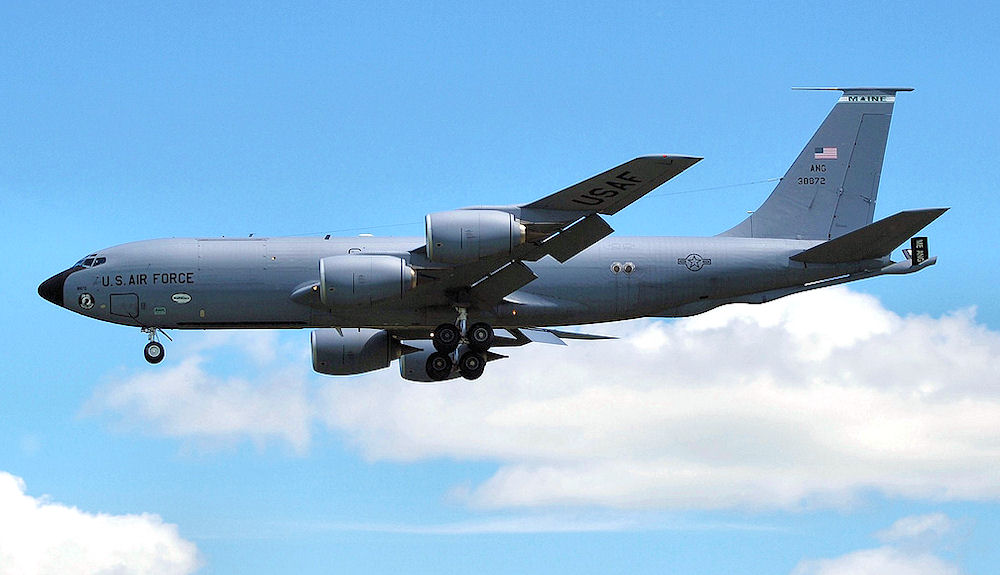
- A US Air Force KC-135R Stratotanker of the 101st Air Refuelling Wing based at Bangor ANGB.

Site information
- Type: Air National Guard Base
- Owner: Department of Defense
- Operator: US Air Force (USAF)
- Controlled by: Air National Guard (ANG)
- Condition: Operational
- Website: www.101arw.ang.af.mil

Location
- Location within Maine Location within the United States
- Coordinates: 44°48′51″N 068°49′51″W

Site history
- Built: 1927 (as Godfrey Field)
- In use: 1927 – present

Garrison information
- Current commander: Colonel Byron Newell
- Garrison: 101st Air Refueling Wing

Airfield information
- Identifiers: IATA: BGR, ICAO: KBGR, FAA LID: BGR, WMO: 726088
- Elevation: 58.5 metres (192 ft) AMSL
Runways
Direction	Length and surface
15/33	3,486.9 metres (11,440 ft) Asphalt
- Airfield shared with Bangor International Airport; Source: Federal Aviation Administration

Bangor Air National Guard Base is a United States Air National Guard base located on the grounds of Bangor International Airport in Bangor, Maine.

Created in 1927 as the commercial Godfrey Field, the airfield was taken over by the U.S. Army just before World War II and renamed Bangor Army Air Field and later Dow Field. It became Dow Air Force Base (AFB) in 1948, when the newly formed U.S. Air Force took over many Army air assets.

In 1968, Dow AFB was closed as part of a nationwide reduction in stateside air force bases and naval air stations to free up funds for combat operations in Southeast Asia. The base was given to the city of Bangor by the General Services Administration as a civilian airport. Maine Air National Guard units continue to be based at the airport in a lease agreement with the city, in an area they had previously occupied when the base was under Air Force control.

== History ==
Godfrey Field opened in 1927 as a commercial airport. Northeast Airlines began commercial operations there in 1931.

=== World War II ===
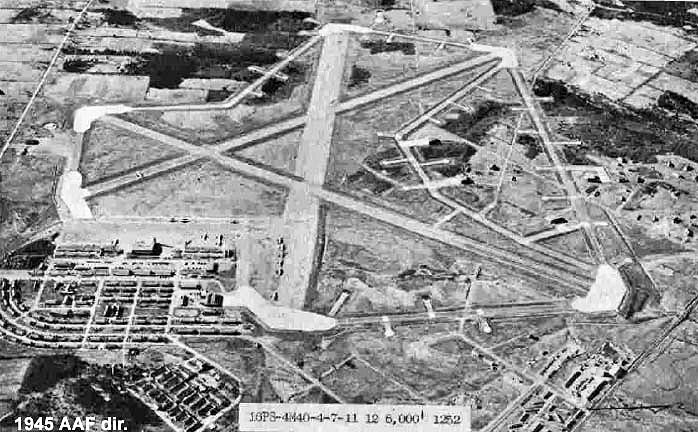
Dow Field, July 1944. Around 1950, the facilities on the south side of the airfield were razed and a new Air Force Base built on the north side of the main runway.

Just before World War II, the United States Army Air Corps took over the base, renamed it Bangor Army Air Field, and placed it under the 8th Service Group, Air Service Command. Bangor AAF prepared and maintained the Lend-Lease aircraft that would be flown by AAC Ferrying Command to RCAF Stations in Newfoundland for eventual transport to Britain. The Army expanded the civil airport, adding three hard-surfaced 7,000-foot runways, aligned 01/19 (N/S), 08/26 (NE/SW) and a main (NW/SE) runway aligned 14/32; along with many hardstands and taxiways to allow the temporary parking of large numbers of aircraft.

In 1942, the station's name was changed to Dow Field to honor James Frederick Dow, an Army Air Corps pilot whose bomber collided with another near Mitchel Field on Long Island, New York, on 17 June 1940. During this time, Milford Auxiliary Airfield was opened nearby at the Bangor Precision Bombing Range.

On 28 February 1942, Dow Field was transferred to Air Service Command (ASC) because of its proximity to the Air Transport Command (ATC) North Atlantic air ferry route to the United Kingdom. Its mission became servicing long-range Boeing B-17 Flying Fortress and, later, Consolidated B-24 Liberator heavy bombers and other combat aircraft before they flew via the Great Circle Route to Prestwick Airport, Scotland; and airfields in Northern Ireland. One of the B-17s that passed through Dow became the most famous B-17 of the war, the Memphis Belle (aircraft). (Once in the British isles, the aircraft were modified for combat missions by Eighth Air Force units for use over Nazi-occupied Europe.) On 5 March 1944, Dow was transferred to Air Transport Command's North Atlantic Wing. In 1944, more than 8,400 aircraft passed through Dow, and about 2,150 in January through May 1945.

After the end of the European war in May 1945, many aircraft returned to the United States via Dow.

=== Cold War ===
==== Air Defense Command ====
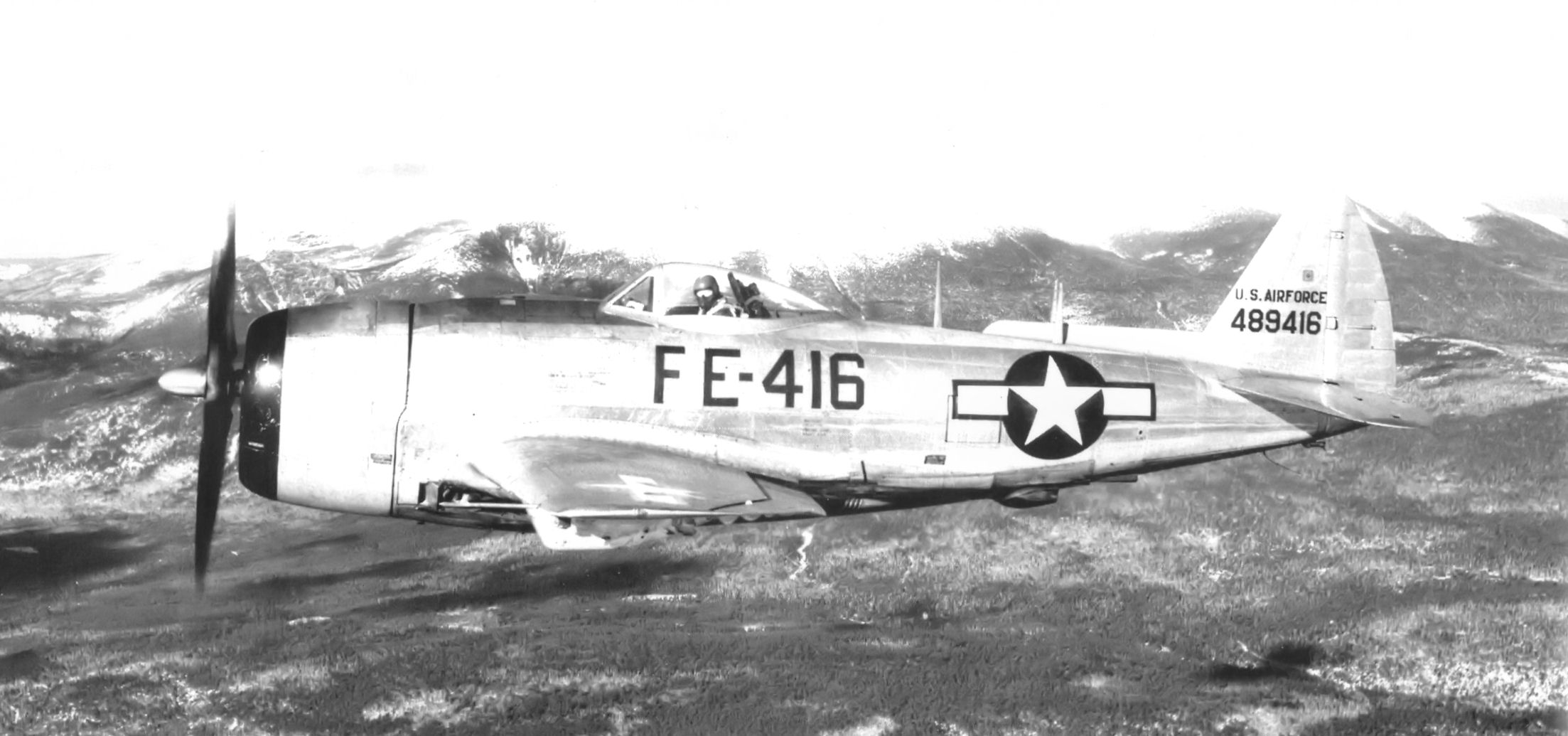
37th Fighter Squadron Republic F-47N-25-RE Thunderbolt, AF Ser. No. 44-89416, Dow AFB, 1948. This aircraft was part of the Last Thunderbolt production block manufactured at Farmingdale, New York.

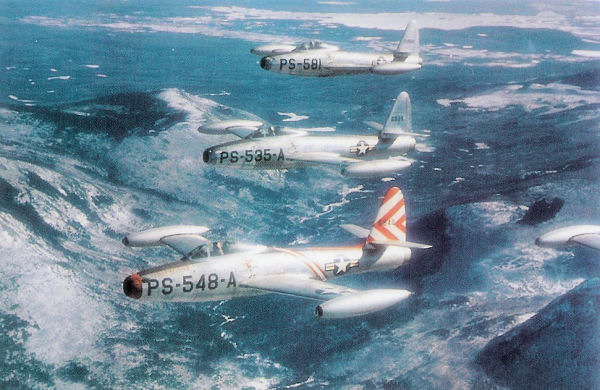
F-84G Thunderjets from the 14th Fighter Group

The base was drawn down during the demobilization in late 1945, and placed in a standby status on 7 May 1946 as a satellite base of Westover Field, Massachusetts. Still, Dow remained part of ATC's North Atlantic Transport route for strategic air transportation between the United States and the United Kingdom, and ATC aircraft passed through the field occasionally.

In November 1946, First Air Force, Air Defense Command, took over the airfield and activated the 14th Fighter Group there, consisting of the P-47N Thunderbolts of the 37th, 48th and 49th Fighter Squadrons. One of the first USAAF groups assigned to Air Defense Command, the unit was responsible for the air defense of the northeastern United States.

4 February 1947: 101st Fighter Group allotted to the State of Maine and received Federal Recognition at Camp Keyes, Augusta, Maine, as the Maine Air National Guard (MeANG).

5 February 1947: 132nd Fighter Squadron allotted to the State of Maine and received Federal Recognition at Dow AFB, Bangor, Maine.

(The Maine Air National Guard was physically established in the area in the Northwest corner of Dow AFB; the area which it continues to occupy to this day, and which later became Bangor Air National Guard Base.)

In July 1947, the group deployed to Muroc AFB, California, to perform acceptance tests on the new F-84B Thunderjets. (The 14th Fighter Group became the 14th Fighter Wing in August 1947.) First operational production USAF F-84Bs arrived at Dow AFB on 7 November; the last P-84B was delivered in February 1948. Throughout the winter of 1947–48, the 14th Fighter Wing lost three F-84s at Dow. Investigators found that the aircraft performed better in the cold Maine climate than during testing in the California desert, yet accidents continued even as spring arrived in 1948.

On 25 August 1948, Dow Air Force Base was assigned to one of ADC's first Air Divisions, the 26th Air Division. Its new mission was defending the northeastern United States from New York City to the Maine-New Brunswick border during daylight and fair weather; the F-82 Twin Mustangs of the 52d Fighter Group (All-Weather) at Mitchel AFB, New York, flew the missions at night and in poor weather.

That year, Deblois Bombing Range was opened nearby and the old Milford Air Force Auxiliary Airfield became part of an Air Force survival school a few years later.

In July 1949, the 14th Fighter Wing sent sixteen F-84Bs to celebrate New York City's new Idlewild Airport. The group was inactivated on 2 October 1949 due to budget cuts.

In the early 1950s, Dow AFB was expanded and rebuilt. A long jet runway was laid down parallel to the wartime NW/SE main runway, and a permanent Air Force Base was built on the north side of the World War II and prewar facility. The older facilities were abandoned and ultimately were torn down. Today, they are a wooded area on the southwest side of the airport. Dow AFB was activated on 1 January 1951. The 4009th Air Base Squadron supported the facility and supervise the remaining construction.

During the Korean War, the Maine Air National Guard was brought into active service at the base. The 101st Fighter-Interceptor Wing activated two F-80C Shooting Star interceptor squadrons (101st FIS, 132d FIS) which were placed under ADC's Eastern Air Defense Force. In 1952, the ANG squadrons were returned to state control and ADC activated the 49th Fighter-Interceptor Squadron at Dow.

The ADC 32d AD also activated several Aircraft Control and Warning Squadrons (128th (WI ANG), 679th, 765th), which were Ground Intercept Radar units. These squadrons were formed at Dow, and later deployed to new radar stations being constructed in Maine which were equipped with long-range radars and then directed the interceptor aircraft at Dow to unknown aircraft which entered their coverage.

On 9 September 1952, Military Air Transport Service Atlantic Division at Westover AFB activated 83d Air Transport Squadron (1600th Air Transport Wing) to Dow AFB as a tenant unit. This was done primarily to relieve overcrowding. The 83d ATS operated C-54 Skymasters from Dow, and its primary mission was to support Northeast Air Command bases and radar stations in Newfoundland and Labrador, Baffin Island, and Greenland. It was reassigned to the 1610th Air Transport Group at Grenier AFB, New Hampshire effective 1 July 1953, however, on 29 May 1953, the eight C-54s of the 83rd ATS departed in a permanent change of station.

In November 1952, jurisdiction of Dow AFB was officially transferred from ADC to Strategic Air Command (SAC). The ADC units remained at the base in a tenant status for a few years, until the 49th FIS was moved and placed under the 4707th Air Defense Wing at Hanscom AFB, Massachusetts in November 1955.

ADC returned to on 1 June 1959, when the 30th Air Defense Missile Squadron was activated 4 miles north-northeast of the base, equipped with 28 CIM-10 Bomarc-A liquid-fueled surface-to-air missiles. Also that month, the 75th Fighter-Interceptor Squadron which was moved from the closing Presque Isle AFB, Maine to Dow to keep interceptors in Maine. The Bomarc missiles remained active until 15 December 1964 when they were inactivated due to limited funding The 75th FIS remained until April 1968 when Dow was inactivated.

==== Strategic Air Command ====
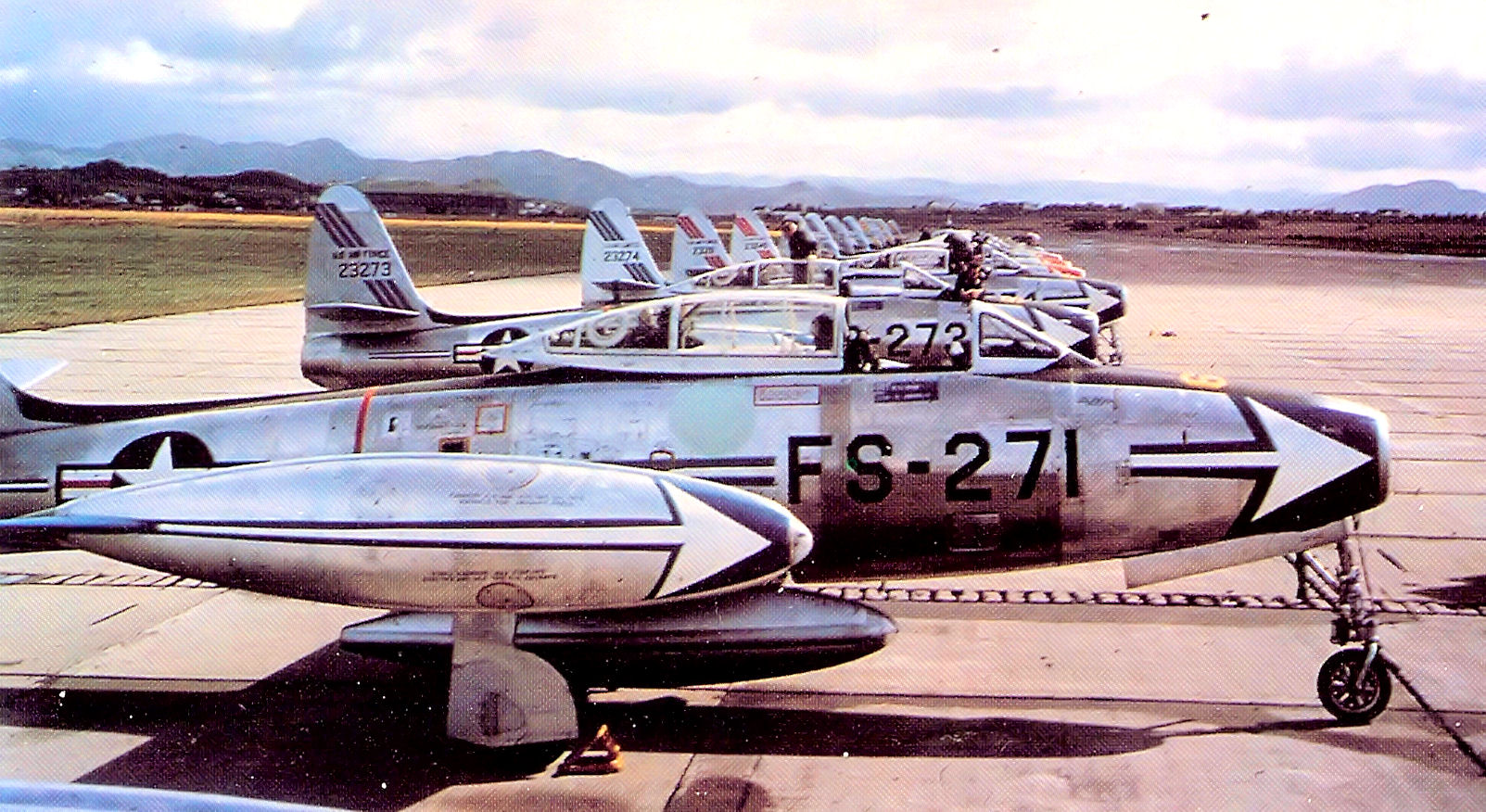
506th Strategic Fighter Wing F-84G Thunderjets 1954

The SAC 506th Strategic Fighter Wing was activated at Dow on 20 November 1952 and was assigned to SAC's Eighth Air Force. The wing included the 457th, 458th and 462d Strategic Fighter Squadrons and was equipped with F-84G Thunderjets. Although assigned to SAC, the group was associated with the ADC units at Dow.

The wing was deployed to Misawa Air Base, Japan in 1953 to support SAC's rotational deployment of fighter units to northern Japan to perform air defense duties, relieving the 12th Strategic Fighter Wing. Under the self-supporting concept, the 506th SFW gained the KB-29P Superfortress 506th Air Refueling Squadron on 23 September 1953. The 506th ARS remained with the wing until 1 March 1955. Upon the wing's return to the United States, the 506th was re-equipped with new F-84F Thunderstreaks, in January 1954 becoming the first SAC fighter wing to be equipped with the swept-wing Thunderjet model. The wing remained at Dow for just over a year until being reassigned to Second Air Force and was transferred to Tinker AFB, Oklahoma on 20 March 1955.

The escort fighters were replaced by the SAC Eighth Air Force 4060th Air Refueling Wing, activated on 8 March 1955. The wing refuelled B-47 Stratojet deployments to Europe and Morocco, with air refueling taking place over the Atlantic Ocean. In addition, during the late 1950s, SAC extended the runway at Dow to 11,000' and alert pads were constructed at the end of Runway 15.

On 15 February 1960, SAC established the 4038th Strategic Wing at Dow as part of SAC's plan to disperse its Boeing B-52 Stratofortress bombers over a larger number of bases, thus making it more difficult for the Soviet Union to knock out the entire fleet with a surprise first strike. The wing consisted of the 341st Bombardment Squadron, of 15 B-52Gs, and the KC-135-equipped 71st Air Refueling Squadron. Half of the aircraft were maintained on fifteen-minute alert, fully fueled, armed, and ready for combat.

The 4038th SW was redesignated as the 397th Bombardment Wing (397th BW) on 1 February 1963 in a name-only redesignation and was assigned to SAC's Eighth Air Force, 6th Air Division. The 341st BS was also redesignated as the 596th Bombardment Squadron, one of the unit's World War II historical bomb squadrons. The 71st ARS designation was unchanged, and component support units were also redesignated to the 397th numerical designation of the newly established wing.

The 397th Bomb Wing continued to conduct strategic bombardment training and air refueling operations to meet operational commitments of Strategic Air Command, including deployments to Southeast Asia during the Vietnam War. By 1968, Intercontinental ballistic missiles (ICBM) had been deployed and become operational as part of the United States' strategic triad, and the need for B-52s had been reduced. In addition, funds were also needed to cover Vietnam War costs., which led to the closure of several other domestic air force bases and naval air stations that year.

Dow AFB officially closed and the "keys" to the major portions of the base were passed to the City of Bangor on 1 April 1968. The 397th Bombardment Wing was inactivated on 25 April 1968, and its aircraft were reassigned to other SAC units.

=== Maine Air National Guard ===
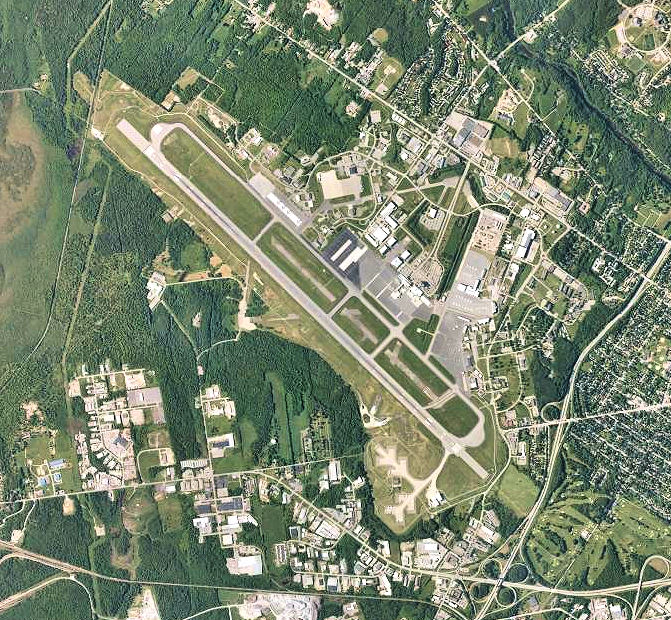
2006 USGS Aerial Photo

With the inactivation of Dow AFB in 1968, most of the base was purchased by the city of Bangor and reopened the following year as Bangor International Airport. The portion of Dow AFB not turned over to the city became the basis for the current Air National Guard Base and the Maine Army National Guard's Army Aviation Support Facility.

Under Maine ANG jurisdiction, the airfield was initially the home to the 101st Air Defense Wing of the Maine Air National Guard, an ANG associate of Aerospace Defense Command's (ADC) 36th Air Division at what was then Topsham AFS, Maine. It operated F-102 Delta Daggers until 1969, then changed to F-101 Voodoo interceptors until 1976. In 1976, the 101st was reassigned to be an associate unit of SAC and was renamed the 101st Air Refueling Wing (101 ARW), operating the KC-135 Stratotanker.

The 101 ARW was later re-equipped with the Boeing KC-135R Stratotanker, which it continues to operate today. and shares the runway with the civilian airport facilities. With the disestablishment of SAC in 1992, the 101 ARW is now operationally gained by the Air Mobility Command (AMC).

=== Over the horizon radar ===
About 1985, the 776th Radar Squadron was reformed with its headquarters at Bangor ANGB. The mission of the squadron was to operate two over the horizon radar (OTH-B) very long-range early warning radar sites. The squadron operated an OTH-B transmitter site at Moscow AFS, Maine, 45°08′14″N 069°48′07″W and a receiver site at Columbia Falls AFS, Maine 44°47′42″N 067°48′41″W. These systems were inactivated in 1997, and the unit was inactivated.

=== Previous names ===
- Godfrey Army Airfield, 1941
- Dow Army Airfield, 1942
- Dow Air Force Base, 1947–1968

=== Major commands to which assigned ===
- Air Service Command, 1941
- Air Transport Command, 1944

On standby status, May–November 1946

- Air Defense Command, 1946
- Strategic Air Command, 1952–1968

Air Defense Command controlled tenant units, 1952–1968

=== Major units assigned ===
- 101st Fighter Group, 4 April 1947

Re-designated 101st Fighter Wing, 1 October 1950
Re-designated 101st Fighter-Interceptor Wing, 1952
Re-designated 101st Air Defense Wing, December 1960
Re-designated 101st Air Refueling Wing, 1976–present

=== Previous aircraft operated ===
- KC-135R Stratotanker (2007–present)
- KC-135E Stratotanker (1984–2007)
- KC-135A Stratotanker (1956–1968) (1976–1984)
- KC-97G Stratofreighter (1955–1963)
- KC-97F Stratofreighter (1955–1963)
- KB-29P Superfortress(1953–1955)
- F-101B Voodoo [1969–1976)
- F-102A Delta Dagger (1969)
- F-89J Scorpion (1959–1969)
- F-89D Scorpion (1957–1959)
- F-94A Starfire (???-???)
- F-86D Sabre (???-???)
- P-51H Mustang (???-???)
- P-51D Mustang (1950)
- P-80C Shooting Star (1948–1950)
- P-47D Thunderbolt (1947–1948)
- F-84G Jan 1953 to Jan 1954
- F-84F Jan 1954 to 1955

== Based units ==
Flying and notable non-flying units based at Bangor Air National Guard Base.

=== United States Air Force ===
Air National Guard

- Maine Air National Guard
  - 101st Air Refueling Wing
    - 101st Operations Group
      - 101st Operations Support Squadron
      - 132nd Air Refueling Squadron – KC-135R Stratotanker
    - 101st Maintenance Group
    - 101st Medical Group
    - 101st Mission Support Group
