= Bodwell (surname) =

Bodwell is a surname. Notable people with the name include:

- Albert E. Bodwell (1851–1926), American architect and designer
- Joseph R. Bodwell (1818–1887), American politician
- Jennie Ferris Bodwell Cave (1902–2001), American politician
- Ebenezer Vining Bodwell (1827–1889), Canadian businessman and politician

The Bodwell Family website provides an extensive history of the family in England, Wales and North America and its genealogy.

== See also ==
- Bodwell (disambiguation)
