= Milford, Maine =

Town in Maine, United States

- Town
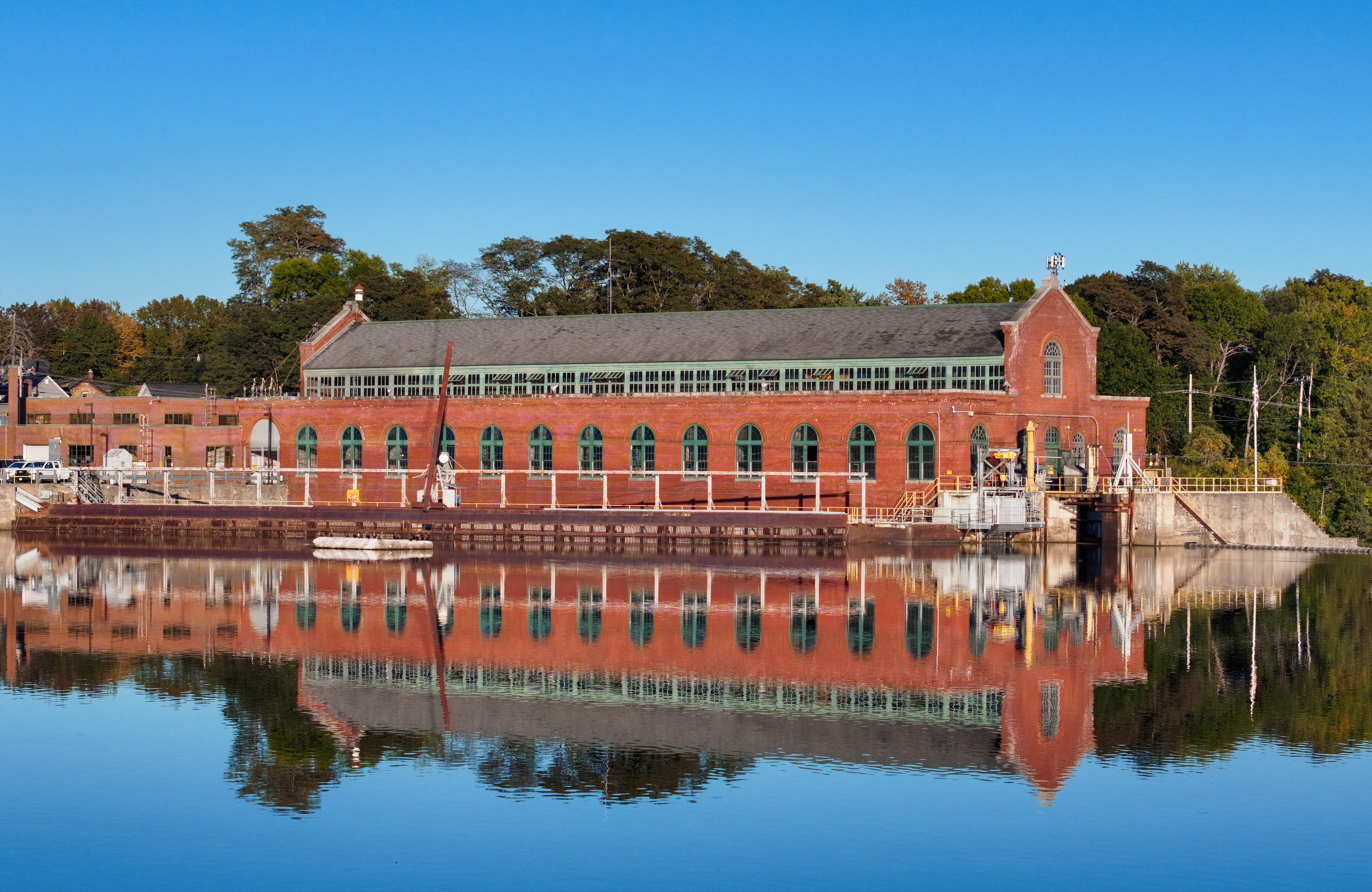
- Bodwell Water Power Company Plant

- Seal
- Motto: "Best Little Town by a Dam Site..."
- Location within Maine Location within the United States
- Coordinates: 44°57′0″N 68°38′24″W
- Country: United States
- State: Maine
- County: Penobscot County

Area
  - Total: 45.80 sq mi (118.62 km^{2})
  - Land: 45.63 sq mi (118.18 km^{2})
  - Water: 0.17 sq mi (0.44 km^{2})
- Elevation: 115 ft (35 m)

Population (2020)
  - Total: 3,069
  - Density: 67/sq mi (26/km^{2})
- Time zone: UTC-5 (Eastern)
  - Summer (DST): UTC-4 (EDT)
- ZIP Code: 04461
- Area code: 207
- GNIS feature ID: 582595
- Website: www.milfordmaine.org

Milford is a town in Penobscot County, Maine, United States. It is located across the Penobscot River from the city of Old Town. The population of Milford was 3,069 at the 2020 census. It contains the census-designated place of the same name. The town's slogan is the "Best little town by a dam site," referring to the Milford Dam abutting Milford on the Penobscot River, south of the Penobscot Indian Island Reservation.

== History ==
The settlement was known as Sunkhaze plantation before it was incorporated as Milford in 1833. Milford was the site of a major 19th-century water powered sawmill on the Penobscot River. Most of its lumber was shipped from nearby Bangor. The large Bodwell Water Power Co. sawmills (1889), owned by Maine Governor Joseph Robinson Bodwell, burned in 1891, almost taking the village with it. The present Bodwell Water Power Co. plant, also known as the Milford Plant of Bangor Hydro, was built in 1906 and is listed on the National Register of Historic Places. It was designed by Wallace C. Johnson, a civil engineer who also worked on hydro-power projects at Niagara Falls.

The Milford Congregational Church, designed and built by Asa T. Wing, is also listed on the National Register.

The Milford Air Force Auxiliary Airfield operated just outside of town.

== Geography ==
According to the United States Census Bureau, the town has a total area of 45.80 square miles (118.62 km^{2}), of which 45.63 square miles (118.18 km^{2}) is land and 0.17 square miles (0.44 km^{2}) is water.

The Sunkhaze Meadows National Wildlife Refuge is located in Milford.

=== Climate ===
This climatic region is typified by large seasonal temperature differences, with warm to hot (and often humid) summers and cold (sometimes severely cold) winters. According to the Köppen Climate Classification system, Milford has a humid continental climate, abbreviated "Dfb" on climate maps.

== Demographics ==
Historical population
Census	Pop.	Note	%±
1840	474		—
1850	687		44.9%
1860	744		8.3%
1870	827		11.2%
1880	734		−11.2%
1890	835		13.8%
1900	838		0.4%
1910	967		15.4%
1920	1,128		16.6%
1930	1,203		6.6%
1940	1,264		5.1%
1950	1,435		13.5%
1960	1,572		9.5%
1970	1,828		16.3%
1980	2,160		18.2%
1990	2,884		33.5%
2000	2,950		2.3%
2010	3,070		4.1%
2020	3,069		0.0%
U.S. Decennial Census

=== 2010 census ===
As of the census of 2010, there were 3,070 people, 1,289 households, and 819 families living in the town. The population density was 67.3 inhabitants per square mile (26.0/km^{2}). There were 1,385 housing units at an average density of 30.4 per square mile (11.7/km^{2}). The racial makeup of the town was 95.7% White, 0.6% African American, 1.4% Native American, 0.5% Asian, 0.2% from other races, and 1.6% from two or more races. Hispanic or Latino of any race were 0.3% of the population.

There were 1,289 households, of which 26.8% had children under the age of 18 living with them, 49.3% were married couples living together, 9.4% had a female householder with no husband present, 4.9% had a male householder with no wife present, and 36.5% were non-families. 23.5% of all households were made up of individuals, and 7.3% had someone living alone who was 65 years of age or older. The average household size was 2.38 and the average family size was 2.81.

The median age in the town was 39.7 years. 18.8% of residents were under the age of 18; 11.1% were between the ages of 18 and 24; 27.5% were from 25 to 44; 30.5% were from 45 to 64; and 12.1% were 65 years of age or older. The gender makeup of the town was 49.3% male and 50.7% female.

=== 2000 census ===
As of the census of 2000, there were 2,950 people, 1,180 households, and 797 families living in the town. The population density was 64.7 inhabitants per square mile (25.0/km^{2}). There were 1,248 housing units at an average density of 27.4 per square mile (10.6/km^{2}). The racial makeup of the town was 96.51% White, 0.10% Black or African American, 1.32% Native American, 0.47% Asian, 0.03% Pacific Islander, 0.41% from other races, and 1.15% from two or more races. Hispanic or Latino of any race were 0.54% of the population.

There were 1,180 households, out of which 33.1% had children under the age of 18 living with them, 54.7% were married couples living together, 9.2% had a female householder with no husband present, and 32.4% were non-families. 21.7% of all households were made up of individuals, and 6.9% had someone living alone who was 65 years of age or older. The average household size was 2.50 and the average family size was 2.93.

In the town, the population was spread out, with 23.7% under the age of 18, 10.7% from 18 to 24, 32.8% from 25 to 44, 21.9% from 45 to 64, and 10.8% who were 65 years of age or older. The median age was 36 years. For every 100 females, there were 98.4 males. For every 100 females age 18 and over, there were 95.3 males.

The median income for a household in the town was $39,500, and the median income for a family was $46,542. Males had a median income of $33,359 versus $25,758 for females. The per capita income for the town was $17,649. About 9.7% of families and 10.8% of the population were below the poverty line, including 9.6% of those under age 18 and 13.8% of those age 65 or over.

== Notable people ==
- Gary Drinkwater, state legislator
- Lulu Hunt Peters, doctor and syndicated health columnist
- Jane Weinberger, author, publisher, wife of Secretary of Defense Caspar Weinberger
