= Maine Coast Guard Battalion =

Maine Coast Guard Companies
- Active: March 18, 1864 to September 6, 1865
- Country: United States
- Allegiance: Union
- Branch: Infantry

The state of Maine organized seven companies of militia infantry for coast guard duties in the Union Army during the American Civil War. They primarily served to garrison coastal fortifications in Maine, with two companies sent to the Defenses of Washington, DC. Very little is known about the organization or command structure of these companies, beyond their commanding officers at the usual rank of captain. Over 800 men served in the seven companies. A New York Times article in 1864 stated that Vice President Hannibal Hamlin served at Fort McClary as a private in the Maine State Guard; some subsequent citations erroneously confuse this with the Maine Coast Guard.

== Companies in service ==
Company A mustered in at Belfast, Maine, March 18, 1864. Stationed at Fort Washington, Maryland. Mustered out May 25, 1865. Captain Charles Baker.

Company B mustered in at Augusta, Maine, April 27, 1864. Stationed at Fort Foote, Maryland. Mustered out June 24, 1865. Captain Oliver J. Conant.

Company C mustered in at Eastport, Maine, May 16, 1864. Stationed at Fort Sullivan, Eastport, Maine. Mustered out September 6, 1865. Captain Thomas P. Hutchinson.

Company D mustered in at Augusta, January 6, 1865. Stationed at Machiasport, Maine. Mustered out September 6, 1865. Captain Charles F. King.

Company E mustered in at Augusta, January 7, 1865. Stationed at Rockland, Maine. Mustered out July 7, 1865. Captains Dumont Bunker and James L. Hunt.

Company F mustered in at Augusta, January 6, 1865. Stationed at Belfast, Maine. Mustered out July 7, 1865. Captain Charles H. Conant.

Company G mustered on March 1, 1865. Stationed at Calais, Maine. Mustered out July 6, 1865. Captain Winslow Roberts.

== See also ==
- List of Maine Civil War units
- Maine in the American Civil War
