= Maine Air National Guard =

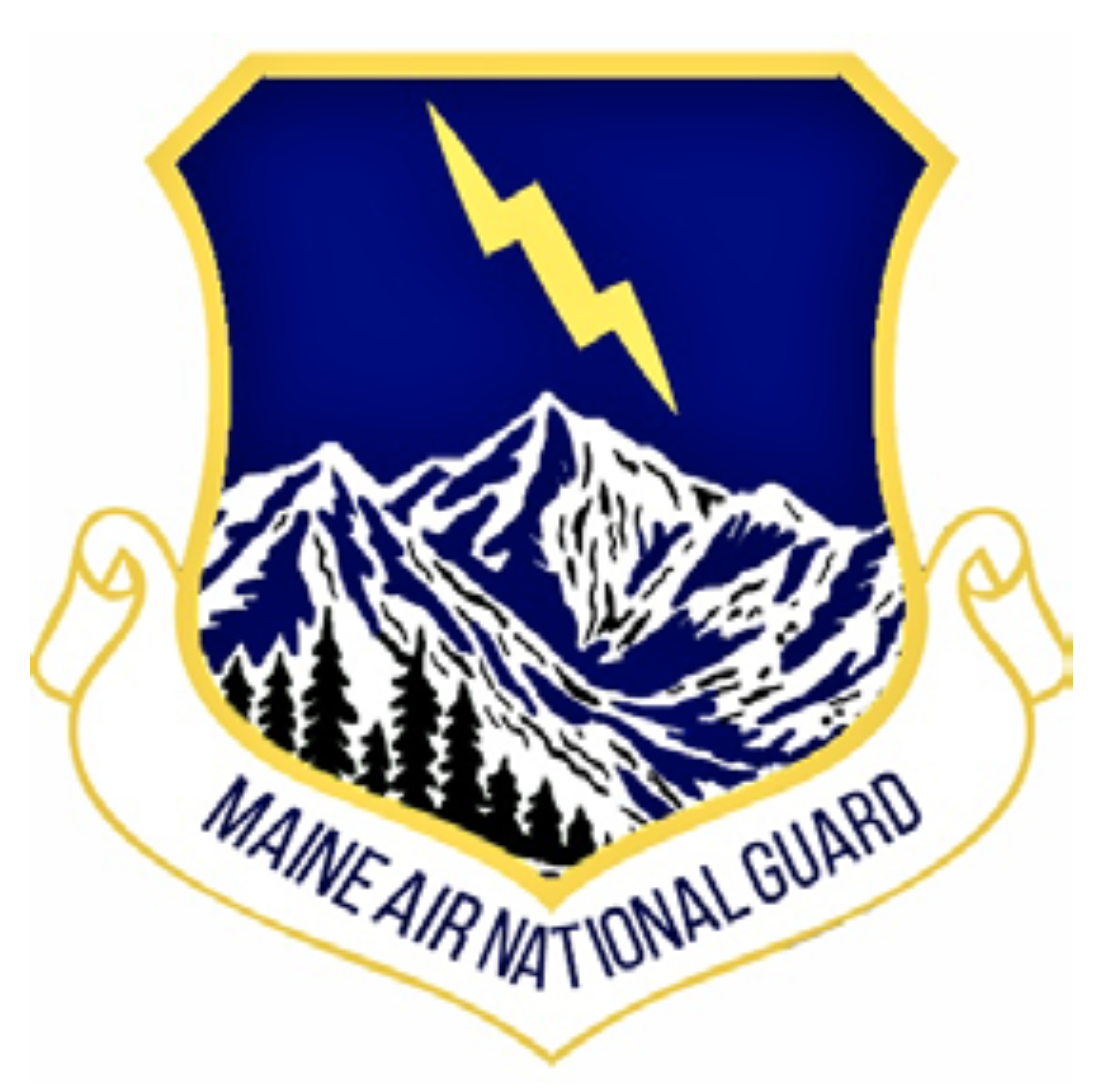
- Emblem of the Maine Air National Guard
- Active: February 4, 1947 – present
- Country: United States
- Allegiance: Maine
- Branch: Air National Guard
- Type: State militia, military reserve force
- Role: "To meet state and federal mission responsibilities."
- Part of: Maine Department of Defense, Veterans, and Emergency Management; Maine National Guard; United States National Guard Bureau
- Garrison/HQ: Maine Air National Guard, Bangor Air National Guard Base, 103 Maineiac Avenue #505, Bangor, Maine, 04401

Commanders
- Civilian leadership: President Donald Trump (Commander-in-Chief); Troy Meink (Secretary of the Air Force); Governor Janet Mills (Governor of the State of Maine)
- Adjutant General of Maine National Guard: Maj. Gen. Douglas A. Farnham
- Maine Air National Guard Commander: Brig. Gen. Frank W. Roy

Insignia
- Logo

Aircraft flown
- Tanker: KC-135R Stratotanker

The Maine Air National Guard (ME ANG) is the aerial militia of the State of Maine, United States of America. It is a reserve of the United States Air Force and along with the Maine Army National Guard, an element of the Maine National Guard of the larger United States National Guard Bureau.

As state militia units, the units in the Maine Air National Guard are not in the normal United States Air Force chain of command. They are under the jurisdiction of the governor of Maine through the office of the Maine Adjutant General unless they are federalized by order of the president of the United States. The Maine Air National Guard is headquartered at Bangor Air National Guard Base, Bangor.

== Overview ==
Under the "Total Force" concept, Maine Air National Guard units are considered to be Air Reserve Components (ARC) of the United States Air Force (USAF). Maine ANG units are trained and equipped by the Air Force and are operationally gained by a major command of the USAF if federalized. In addition, the Maine Air National Guard forces are assigned to Air Expeditionary Forces and are subject to deployment tasking orders along with their active duty and Air Force Reserve counterparts in their assigned cycle deployment window.

Along with their federal reserve obligations, as state militia units the elements of the Maine ANG are subject to being activated by order of the governor to provide protection of life and property, and preserve peace, order and public safety. State missions include disaster relief in times of earthquakes, hurricanes, floods and forest fires, search and rescue, protection of vital public services, and support to civil defense.

== Components ==
The Maine Air National Guard consists of the following major unit:

- 101st Air Refueling Wing

Established 4 February 1947 (as: 132d Fighter Squadron); operates: KC-135R Stratotanker
Stationed at: Bangor Air National Guard Base
Gained by: Air Mobility Command

Support Unit Functions and Capabilities:

- 243d Engineering and Installation Squadron
- 265th Combat Communications Squadron

The 265th CBCS provides mobile/transportable communications packages complete with all personnel and support equipment in support of Air Force flying operations on a world-wide basis. The 265th responds to contingency requirements with individual packages, combinations of packages or communications systems.

Both of these units are stationed in South Portland, Maine.

== History ==
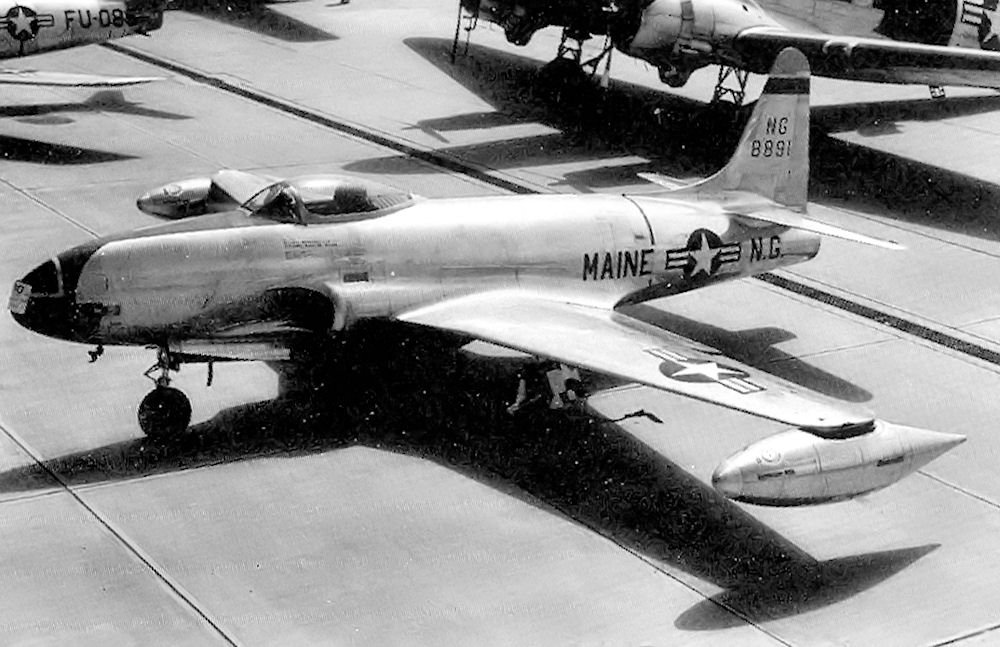
A Lockheed F-80C Shooting Star of the 132d Fighter Squadron, 1950

On 24 May 1946, the United States Army Air Forces, in response to dramatic postwar military budget cuts imposed by President Harry S. Truman, allocated inactive unit designations to the National Guard Bureau for the formation of an Air Force National Guard. These unit designations were allotted and transferred to various State National Guard bureaus to provide them unit designations to re-establish them as Air National Guard units.

The Maine Air National Guard origins date to the formation of the 132d Fighter Squadron at Dow Army Airfield, Bangor, receiving federal recognition on 4 February 1947. It was equipped with F-47D Thunderbolts and its mission was the air defense of the state. 18 September 1947, however, is considered the Maine Air National Guard's official birth, concurrent with the establishment of the United States Air Force as a separate branch of the United States military under the National Security Act.

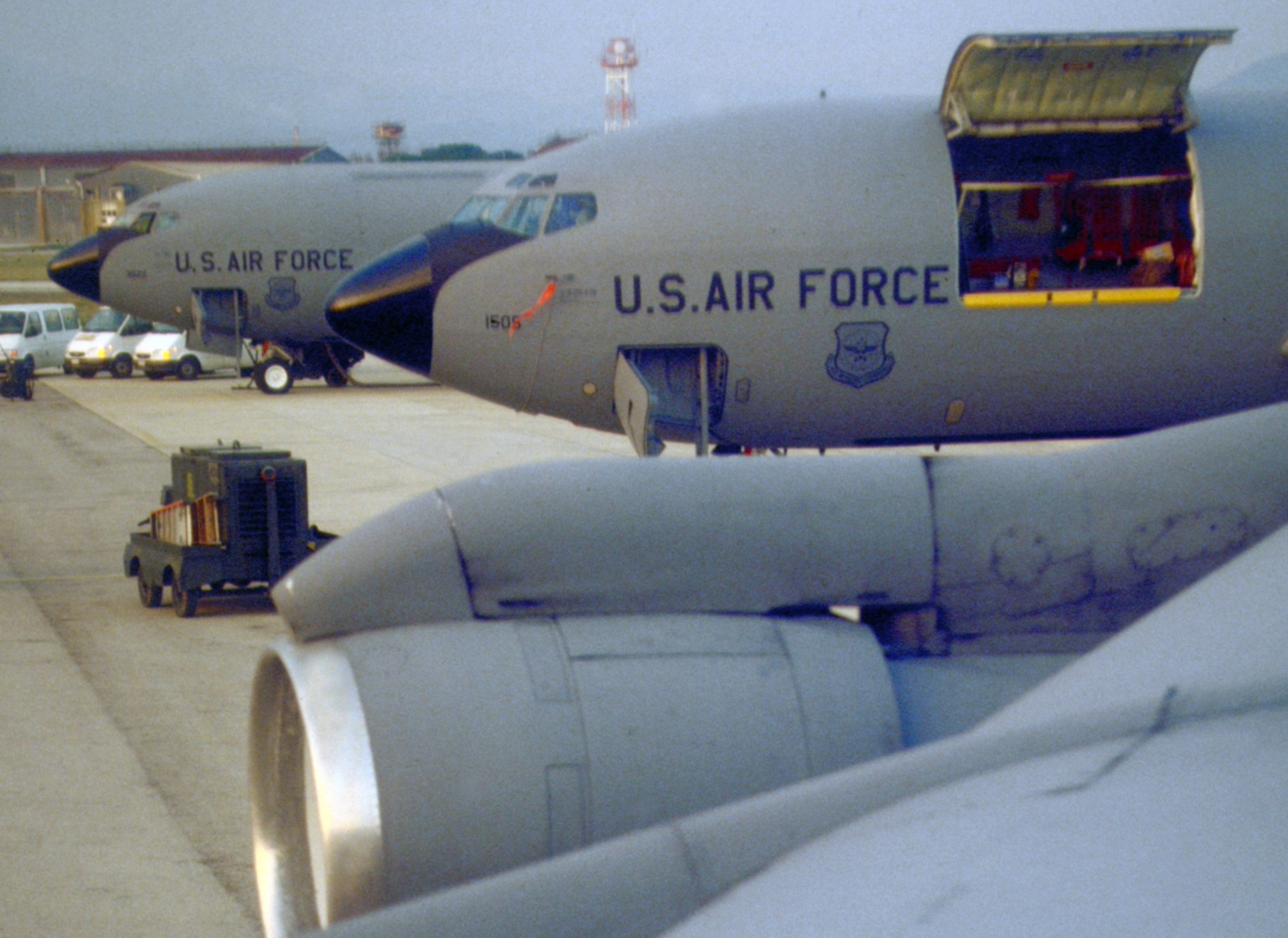
KC-135Es of the 101st Air Refueling Wing at Pisa Airport, Italy, 1996

The 132d was placed under the organization of the 67th Fighter Wing with headquarters at Logan Airport, Boston, Massachusetts (USA). The Maine 101st Fighter Group was federally recognized on 4 April 1947 with station at Camp Keyes, Augusta, Maine. Additional units of the 101st FG were organized and federally recognized. These units were:

- 132d Weather Station
- 201st Air Service Group
- 201st Air Service Group, Det. A

In December 1948 the command was transferred to the Continental Air Command. Two years later the 101st FG was reorganized into a Wing-Base in order to standardize the Guard units with their active duty counterparts. This provided for additional supporting medical, service, transportation and base operating elements.

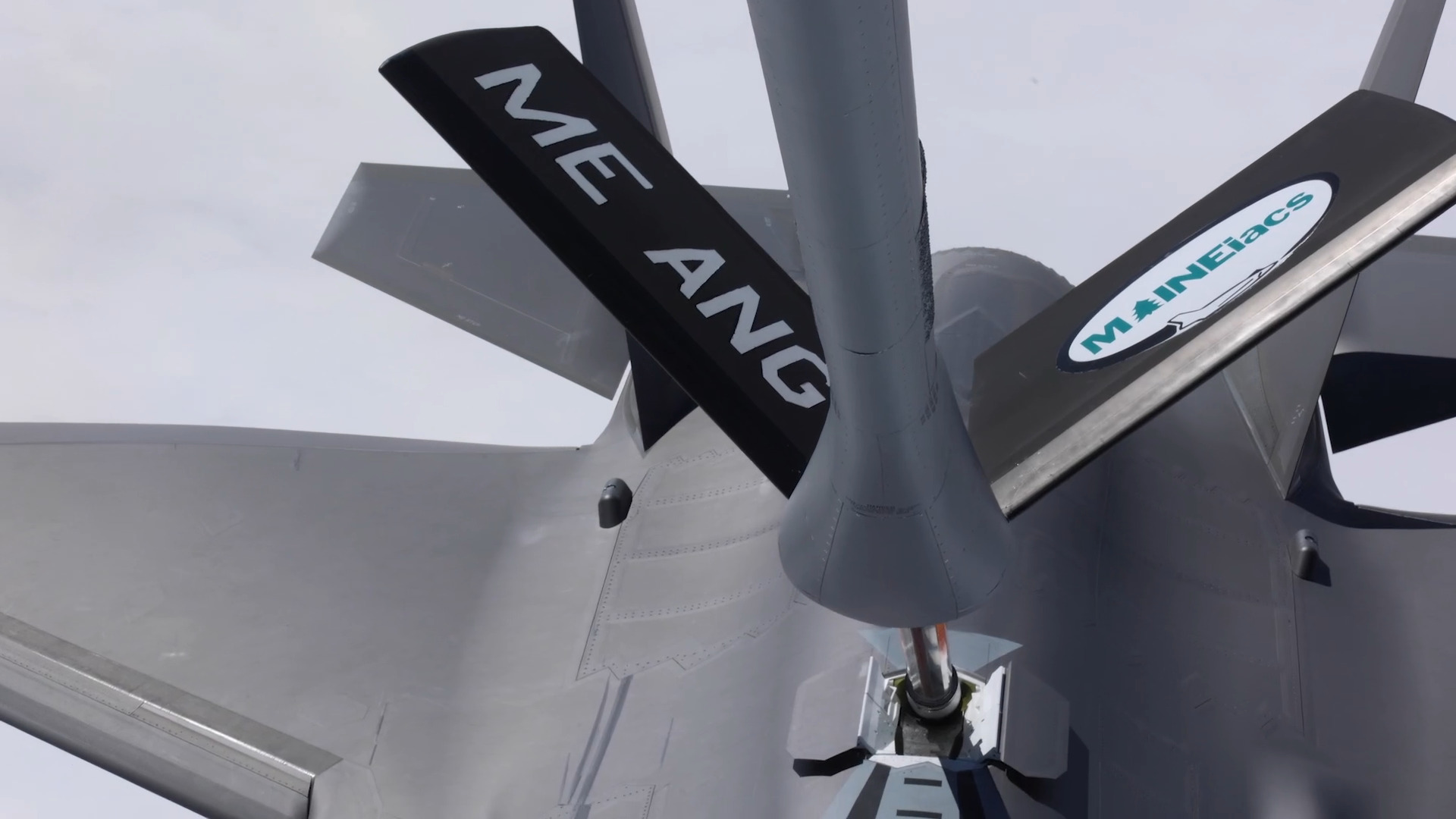
The 101st performs an aerial refueling procedure with an F-35 Lightning, June 5, 2023

The 101st Fighter Group was federalized and ordered to active service on 10 February 1951 as a result of the Korean War, being assigned to the Eastern Air Defense Force, Air Defense Command (ADC). ADC changed the status of the 101st from a Group to a Wing, and established the 101st Fighter-Interceptor Wing. The 101st Fighter-Interceptor Group was assigned to the new Wing as a subordinate unit. Support elements of the wing were the 101st Air Base Group; 101st Maintenance and Supply Group, and 101st Medical Group. The 132d, 133d and 134th Fighter-Interceptor Squadrons remained assigned to the 101st FIG.

The mission of the 101st FIW was the air defense of New England. Its assigned squadrons were dispersed and equipped as follows:

- 132d Fighter-Interceptor Squadrons, Dow AFB (F-80C)
- 133d Fighter-Interceptor Squadrons, Grenier AFB (F-47D)
- 134th Fighter-Interceptor Squadrons, Burlington Municipal Airport (F-51H)

On 1 February 1952, the 101st Fighter-Interceptor Wing and Group were inactivated, the unit being taken over by the Air Defense Command 4711th Defense Wing at Presque Isle AFB, Maine. The 4711th assumed its mission and its operational squadrons all being transferred to the 4711th DW. The Maine State ANG Headquarters, Camp Keyes, Augusta was organized and federally recognized on 19 March 1952.

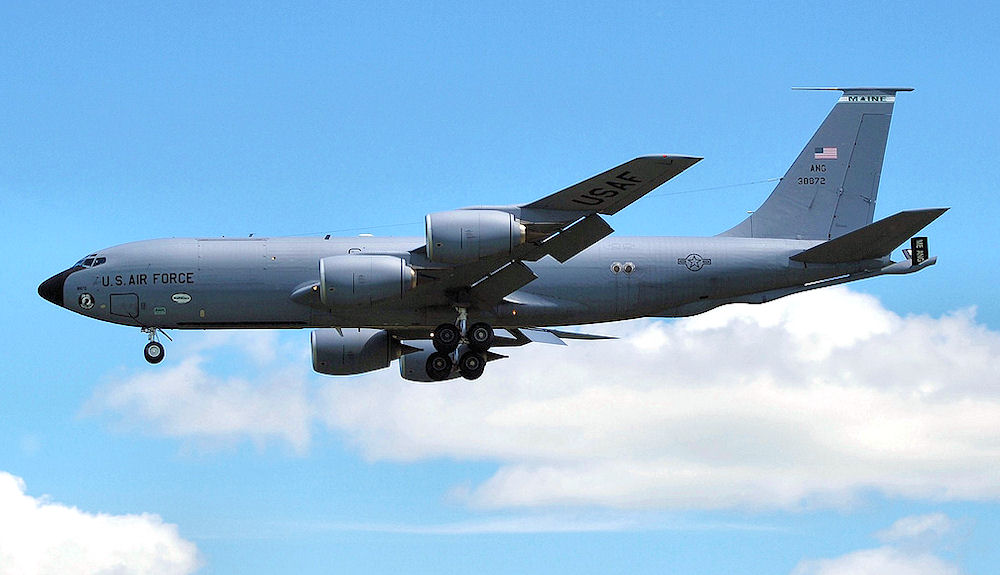
KC-135 Stratotanker of the Maine National Guard

On 15 April 1956 the 101st FG was put on duty in New Hampshire until December 1960, when it was reassigned and reactivated in the State of Maine. The first nurses were assigned to the Maine Air National Guard in June 1956. Four years later the responsibility for training and inspection of the ANG was transferred from the Continental Air Command to the Air Defense Command. When the USAF Air Defense Command reorganized its Continental Air Defense forces to a numbered Air Force/Air Division Organization in April 1966, the 101st Air Defense Wing was assigned to the 36th Air Division located at Topsham Air Force Station, Maine and to Headquarters, First Air Force located at Stewart Air Force Base, New York. In September 1967 the number of aircraft was reduced from 25 to 18.

In April 1976, the first KC-135A Stratotankers were assigned to the unit and the gaining command was changed from Air Defense Command to Strategic Air Command.

In August 1990 selected Maine ANG units were mobilized in support of the Operation Desert Storm. Two years later the gaining command changed from SAC to the Air Mobility Command. The 101st ARW was then integrated into the Northeast Tanker Task Force (NTTF) in September 1994.

After the September 11th, 2001 terrorist attacks on the United States, elements of every Air National Guard unit in Maine has been activated in support of the global war on terrorism. Flight crews, aircraft maintenance personnel, communications technicians, air controllers and air security personnel were engaged in Operation Noble Eagle air defense overflights of major United States cities. Also, Maine ANG units have been deployed overseas as part of Operation Enduring Freedom in Afghanistan and Operation Iraqi Freedom in Iraq as well as other locations as directed.

== See also ==
- Maine State Guard
- Maine Wing Civil Air Patrol
