= Maine Department of Defense, Veterans, and Emergency Management =

Government agency in Maine

The Maine Department of Defense, Veterans, and Emergency Management (DVEM) is a government agency in Maine. It comprises the two components of the Maine National Guard, the Maine Army National Guard and the Maine Air National Guard, the Bureau of Veterans' Affairs, the Maine Emergency Management Agency, and when it is active, the Maine State Guard. The Adjutant General of Maine, Brigadier General Diane L. Dunn, commands the Maine National Guard and serves as the State's Commissioner of Defense, Veterans, and Emergency Management (DVEM). The Maine Army and Air National Guard has responded to every call of the State and Nation since before the Revolutionary War. Their soldiers and airmen are trained to high standards and are ready to respond to combat missions, domestic emergencies, counterdrug efforts, reconstruction missions and more.

== Bureau of Veterans' Affairs ==
Maine Veterans' Services was established in 1947. The Bureau's main office is located at Camp Keyes in Augusta. The Bureau comes under the Department of Defense, Veterans and Emergency Management. In addition to the main office, the Bureau has six field service offices strategically located throughout the state and a claims office located at the US Department of Veterans Affairs, Togus, Maine. The Maine Veterans' Memorial Cemetery system is also a part of the Bureau and consists of two cemeteries located in Augusta and Caribou. The Bureau is currently in the planning stages for the development of another cemetery in Springvale.

== Maine National Guard ==
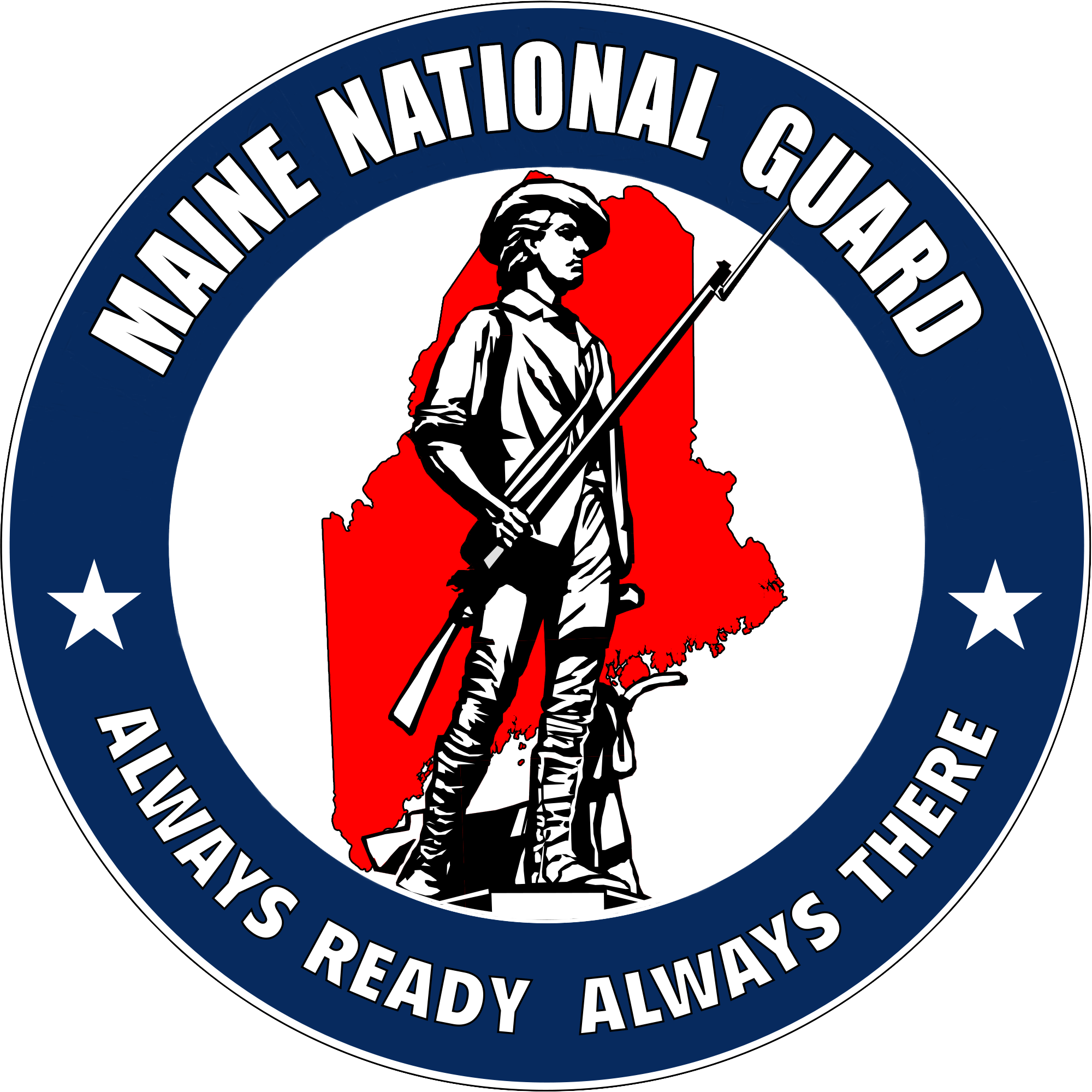
Seal of the Maine National Guard

The Maine National Guard consists of the Maine Army National Guard and the Maine Air National Guard. The Guard is administered by the adjutant general, an appointee of the governor of Maine. The Constitution of the United States specifically charges the National Guard with dual federal and state missions. Those functions range from limited actions during non-emergency situations to full scale law enforcement of martial law when local law enforcement officials can no longer maintain civil control.

The National Guard may be called into federal service in response to a call by the president or Congress. When National Guard troops are called to federal service, the president serves as Commander-in-Chief. The federal mission assigned to the National Guard is: "To provide properly trained and equipped units for prompt mobilization for war, National emergency or as otherwise needed." The governor may call individuals or units of the Maine National Guard into state service during emergencies or to assist in special situations which lend themselves to use of the National Guard. The state mission assigned to the National Guard is: "To provide trained and disciplined forces for domestic emergencies or as otherwise provided by state law." The current adjutant general for the Maine National Guard is Brigadier General Diane L. Dunn.

The headquarters for the Maine National Guard is at Camp Keyes in Augusta, Maine.

=== Maine Army National Guard ===
The Maine Army National Guard is a component of the United States Army and the United States National Guard. Nationwide, the Army National Guard comprises approximately one half of the US Army's available combat forces and approximately one third of its support organization. National coordination of various state National Guard units are maintained through the National Guard Bureau.

The Maine National Guard was officially established in 1820 as a State Militia, when Maine entered the Union (as a result of the Missouri Compromise). Forty years later, more than 72,000 Soldiers from Maine fought to preserve the Union during the Civil War (1861–65).

Maine's Army National Guard units are trained and equipped as part of the United States Army. The same ranks and insignia are used and National Guardsmen are eligible to receive all United States military awards. The Maine Guard also bestows a number of state awards for local services rendered in or to the state of Maine.

The Maine Army National Guard is composed of 48 units spread across approximately 29 armories and is present in 26 communities in Maine. The headquarters of the Maine Army National guard is located at Camp Keyes in the state capitol, Augusta, Maine

The larger units in the state specialize in:

- Engineering and construction - 133rd Engineer Battalion
- Aviation - 142nd & 126th Aviation Companies

Smaller unit's specialties include:

- Military police
- Transportation and maintenance
- Infantry
- Headquarters related support units
- Full List of Units

In addition, the Maine National Guard includes the 11th Weapons of Mass Destruction Civil Support Team. The 11th WMD CST was of the first of the now 57 teams that are spread across the United States of America that is tasked with immediate, less than 4 hour response to any unknown chemical, biological, and/or radiological incident. The joint Army/Air Guard team can self-sustain for 72 hours of continuous operation and is constantly training to stay on top of the technology and techniques for sampling, evidence collection, identification, and education of the possibilities that the team may be alerted for.

=== Maine Air National Guard ===
The Maine Air National Guard is the air force militia of the U.S. state of Maine. It is, along with the Maine Army National Guard, an element of the Maine National Guard. It is considered a part of the United States Air Force, as well as its state mission.

Today, the Maine Air National Guard consists of three units:

- 101st Air Refueling Wing, at Bangor ANGB (the former Dow Air Force Base) which operates the KC-135R.
- 243rd Engineering and Installation Squadron.
- 265th Combat Communications Squadron, both based in South Portland, ME.

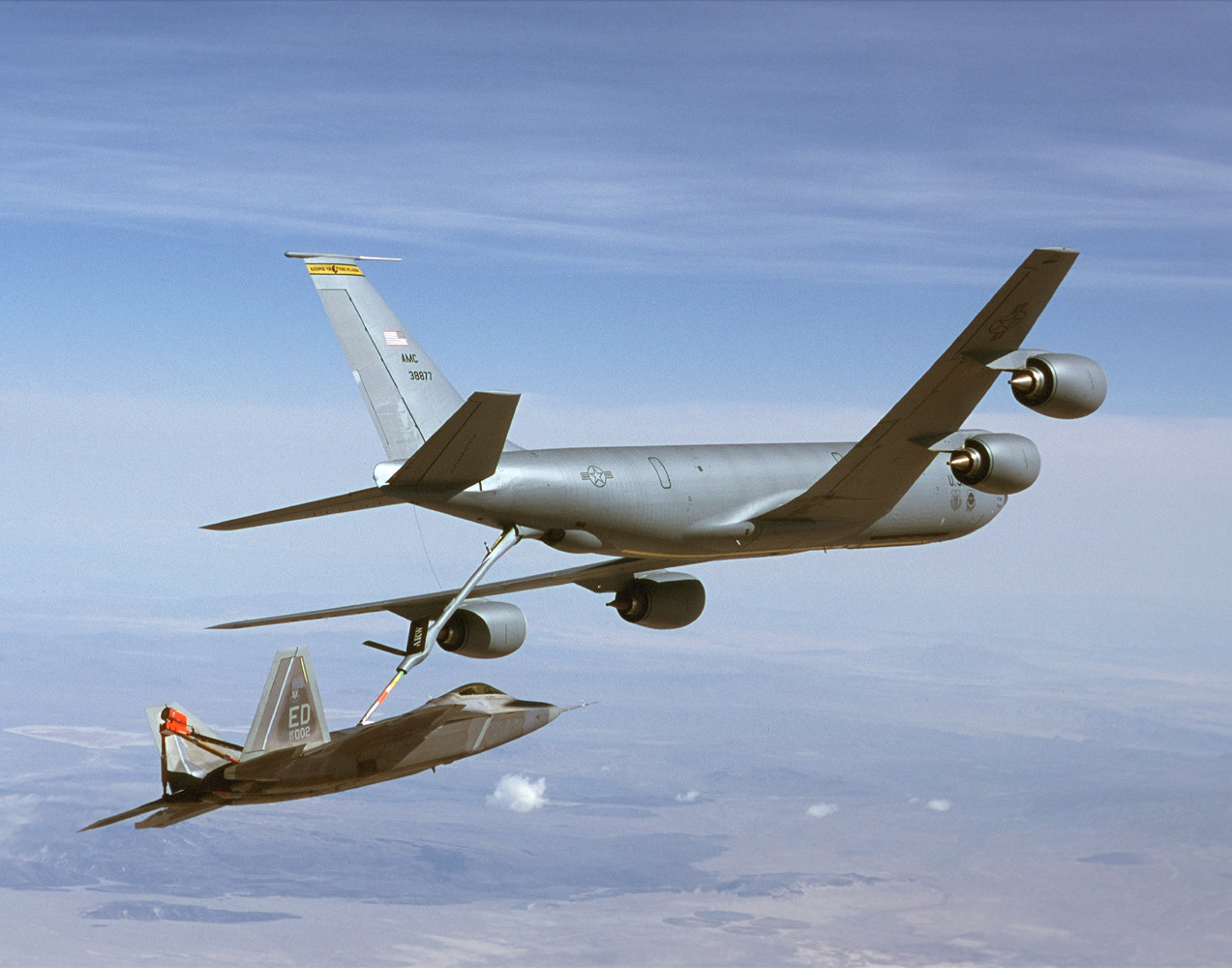
KC-135 Stratotanker refueling an F-22

== Maine Emergency Management Agency ==
At the State level MEMA coordinates the mitigation (risk reduction) preparedness, response and recovery from emergencies and disasters such as floods, hurricanes, earthquakes or hazardous materials spills.

MEMA also provides guidance, and assistance to county and local governments, businesses and nonprofit organizations in their efforts to provide protection to citizen and property, and increase resiliency in the face of disaster. The Agency uses strategies such as planning, training, exercise and public education to carry out its mission.

Since 2001, MEMA has been the focal point for the implementation of programs regarding Homeland Security, integrating these concerns into its all-hazard mission.

== Maine State Guard ==
The Maine State Guard is the currently-inactive state defense force of Maine, which replaced the Maine National Guard and performed their stateside duties during World War II and the Vietnam War. The state guard is currently inactive. However, it may be reactivated at the governor's discretion.
