= Maine State Guard =

- The Maine State Guard's shoulder patch
- Country: United States
- Allegiance: State of Maine
- Type: State defense force
- Role: Military reserve force
- Size: 1 regiment (World War I); 2,000 (World War II); 350+ cadre (Vietnam War)
- Part of: Maine Department of Defense, Veterans, and Emergency Management
- Garrison/HQ: Camp Keyes

Commanders
- Civilian Leadership: Governor of Maine

The Maine State Guard was the state defense force of the state of Maine during World War I, World War II, and the Vietnam War. As a state defense force, the State Guard served as a stateside replacement for the Maine National Guard when the National Guard was federalized. Like the National Guard, the State Guard was a reserve military force composed of members who held full-time civilian jobs and periodically met for drills, unless called into active service by the governor. However, unlike the National Guard, as a state defense force, the Maine State Guard was solely a state military force, which was immune from federalization and could not be deployed outside the State of Maine.

== History of predecessor units ==
Prior to the creation of the National Guard of the United States, the United States armed forces consisted of a relatively small professional, full-time military supported by state militias. During the War of 1812, the relatively large size of the various Maine militias was enough to discourage enemy interventions at Wiscasset, Bath, and Portland. In the American Civil War, Maine once again raised multiple units to fight for the United States, along with State Guard, Home Guard, and Maine Coast Guard companies for service in Maine. In the Spanish–American War, Maine mustered two units: the 1st Maine Volunteer Infantry Regiment and the Maine Volunteer Heavy Artillery Battalion.

== Civil War ==
At least five militia companies of the Maine State Guard were raised for duty in Maine during the Civil War. Since they were lettered A, B, E, G, and I, there may have been nine or more of these companies. Vice President Hannibal Hamlin was a member of Company A, and when that company was mustered into service on 7 July 1864, became a private at Fort McClary in Kittery. In some citations of the original article, his unit is confused with the Maine Coast Guard.

== World War I ==
Maine's National Guard was federalized during World War I. As a result, the War Department authorized the state to raise an infantry regiment which would be equipped by the federal government and left under state control. The Maine State Guard was then created to replace the absent National Guard.

== World War II ==
The federalization of the entire National Guard on the onset of World War II left states without a military force to protect infrastructure, respond to disasters, repel potential enemy incursions, and handle other emergencies that would normally fall to the National Guard.

The Maine State Guard was reactivated during World War II to replace the Maine National Guard by handling its stateside responsibilities, including assuming responsibility for natural disaster response and quelling civil disturbances. The State Guard was headquartered in Camp Keyes, which was the headquarters of the Maine National Guard. At one point, three companies of the Maine State Guard used their own vehicles to assist in the search for six German prisoners of war who had escaped while working in the woods.

== Vietnam War ==
The Maine State Guard was reorganized in the spring of 1969 at a cadre level, reaching a strength of 97 officers, 272 enlisted men, and a smaller number of inactive guardsmen designated as the Maine State Guard Reserve. The state appropriated $8,700 annually for the State Guard. Although the unit was never activated, they drilled regularly through the Vietnam War, but was reduced to a force existing only on paper following the end of the conflict.

== Legal status ==
State defense forces are authorized by the federal government under Title 32, Section 109 of the United States Code. Twenty-three states and the territory of Puerto Rico currently maintain active state defense forces. Maine state law also authorizes the governor to organize a state defense force under Title 37 of the Maine Revised Statutes. Therefore, the Maine State Guard could be reactivated by the Governor of Maine through executive order using the existing legal framework for state defense forces, or by a legislative act.

== See also ==
- Maine Wing Civil Air Patrol
