= Bodwell Water Power Company Plant =

- U.S. National Register of Historic Places
- U.S. Historic district
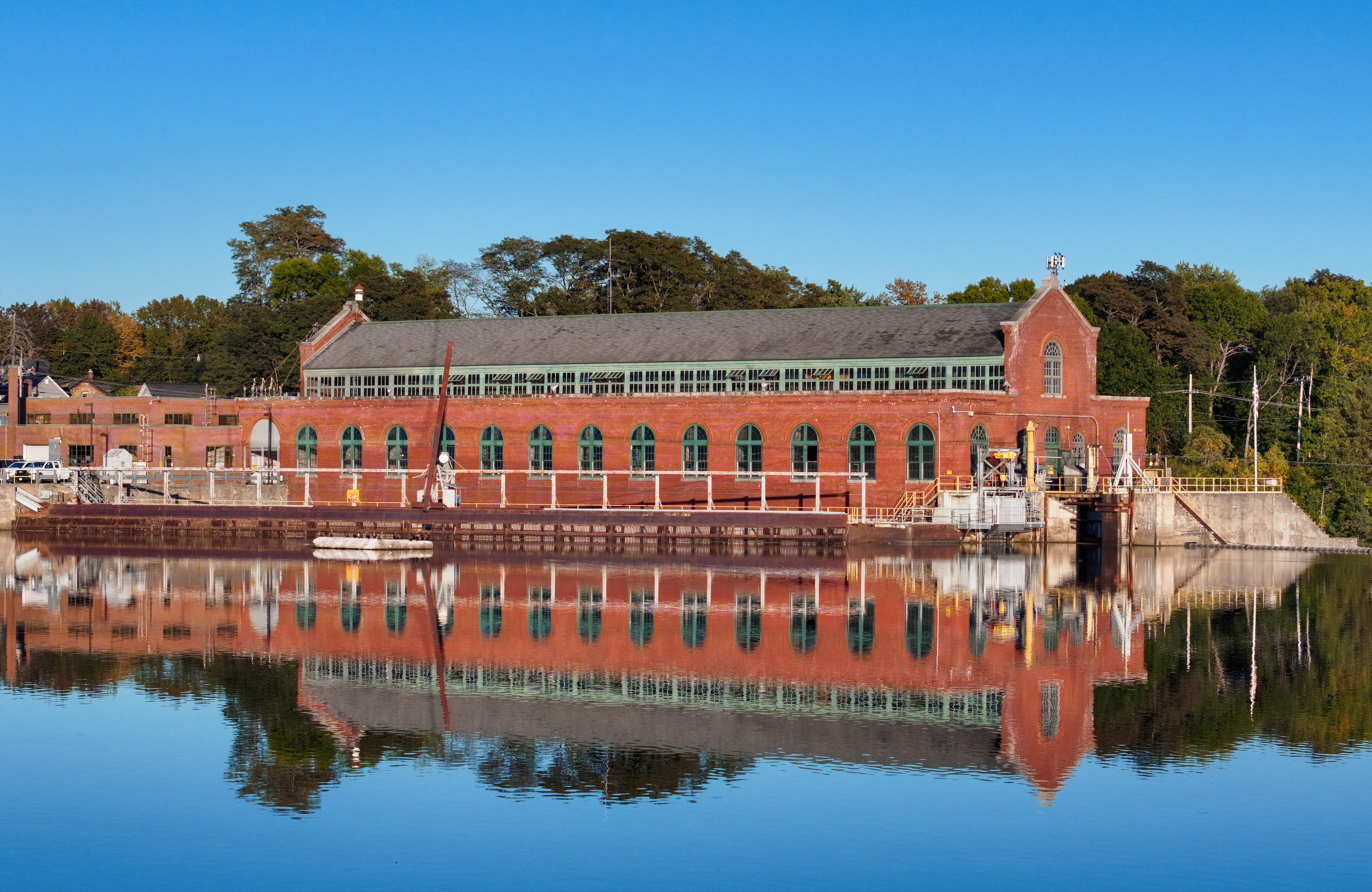

- Location within Maine Location within the United States
- Location: E side of Penobscot River at Bridge St., Milford, Maine
- Coordinates: 44°56′31″N 68°38′41″W
- Area: 10.8 acres (4.4 ha)
- Built: 1906
- Engineer: Wallace Clyde Johnson
- Architectural style: Romanesque
- NRHP reference No.: 88001842
- Added to NRHP: September 29, 1988

The Bodwell Water Power Company Plant, also known as the Milford Plant of Emera Maine (formerly Bangor Hydro), is a hydroelectric power generation facility on the Penobscot River in Milford, Maine. Its main building, a handsome Romanesque structure, stands at the eastern end of the Milford Dam. Built in 1906, it was at that time the largest hydroelectric facility in the state, and its construction marked a shift from water to electrical power of area industries. It was listed on the National Register of Historic Places in 1988.

== Description ==
The Bodwell Water Power Company Plant stands at the eastern end of Milford Dam, although it is technically not a part of the dam; a log sluiceway and fish ladder separate the facilities. The dam and power plant are located at one of the major falls on that stretch of the river, and its largest single source of power. The plant is a monumental steel-framed structure faced in brick, measuring 220 by 85 feet (67 m × 26 m), and projecting over the river on a two-story concrete foundation. The base of foundation is an arcade of arches, with square windows above aligned with those of the structure resting on top. The main structure is roughly that of a basilica, with a tall central section flanked by lower side sections, with clerestory windows at the sides of the central section. The interior has original tile floors, iron railings, and other features, including a traveling industrial crane that can be used to maneuver heavy equipment throughout the building.

== History ==
The site where the power plant stands was the location of a large sawmill in the 1880s and 1890s. Joseph Robinson Bodwell was a major owner of the Milford Land Company, which owned that mill, and it was under the aegis of that company that the power plant and dam were built in 1905–1907. The reasons for the architectural sophistication, especially for a comparatively remote site, of the main plant are not known, but follow a trend for high-style architecture in large public buildings during that period. It was designed by Wallace C. Johnson, a civil and mechanical engineer who had worked on hydroelectric projects in Niagara, New York. The plant was originally designed to produce 12,000 horsepower, and the power was mainly sold to industrial customers in nearby communities. (The mill standing across the river in Old Town was not one of these customers—it had its own internal power plant.)

In 1998 Bangor Hydro, then the owner of the plant, sold it (along with its other hydroelectric power generation assets) to PP&L Global of Fairfax, Virginia. It is now owned by Black Bear Hydro Partners LLC, and has an authorized capacity of 8 megawatts.

== See also ==
- Ellsworth Power House and Dam, built about the same time
- National Register of Historic Places listings in Penobscot County, Maine
