= 29th Maine Infantry Regiment =

- Active: December 17, 1863, to June 21, 1866
- Country: United States
- Allegiance: Union
- Branch: Infantry
- Size: Regiment
- Mascots: Major (a dog), killed in action at Sabine Cross Roads April 8, 1864
- Engagements: Red River Campaign; Battle of Sabine Crossroads; Sheridan's Valley Campaign; Battle of Opequon; Battle of Fisher's Hill; Battle of Cedar Creek

Commanders
- Colonel: George Lafayette Beal
- Colonel: George H. Nye

The 29th Maine Infantry Regiment was an infantry regiment that served in the Union Army during the American Civil War.

== Service ==
The 29th Maine Infantry was organized at Augusta, Maine and mustered in on December 17, 1863, for three years' service. The regiment was composed primarily of re-enlisted veterans of the 10th Maine Infantry, and its full name was the 29th Maine Veteran Volunteer Infantry. The regiment was under the command of Colonel George Lafayette Beal, previously the commander of the 10th Maine Infantry, who also served as their brigade commander from April 19, 1864.

Lieutenant Colonel Charles S. Emerson was the acting commander of the regiment until he was sent back to Maine on account of illness on August 27, 1864. Command then devolved on Major William Knowlton, who died of wounds received at the Battle of Opequon on September 20, 1864. Captain George H. Nye was then promoted to major on October 18, 1864, and assumed command of the regiment.

Colonel Beal was promoted to brigadier general on November 13, 1864. Major Nye was elected by a vote of the regiment's officers to become the regimental commander on December 7 and was promoted to colonel effective December 20. The regiment's adjutant, 1st Lieutenant John Mead Gould, was elected as the regiment's major on December 19 and was promoted to that rank effective December 20.

Company A and Company D were transferred in from the 10th Maine Infantry Battalion (which was disbanded at this time) on May 30, 1864. The 10th Maine Battalion was composed of three-year men from the 10th Maine Infantry.

The regiment was attached to 2nd Brigade, 1st Division, XIX Corps, Department of the Gulf, to July 1864. 1st Brigade, 1st Division, XIX Corps, Department of the Gulf and Army of the Shenandoah, Middle Military Division, to March 1865. 1st Brigade, 1st Division, Army of the Shenandoah, to April 1865. 1st Brigade, 1st Division, Department of Washington, to June 1865. District of South Carolina, Department of the South, to June 1866.

Company A mustered out October 18, 1864 (having departed from the field in the Shenandoah Valley October 5, 1864) at the expiration of its original enlistment, and was replaced by the one-year men of the 1st Unassigned Company of Maine Infantry as "new" Company A, which reported for duty October 6, 1864. The remainder of the 29th Maine Infantry mustered out of service June 21, 1866.

The regiment's history, History of the 1st-10th-29th Maine Regiment, was written by Major John Mead Gould. The regiment's flags are preserved in the Maine State Museum.

== Detailed service ==
Left Maine for New Orleans, La., January 31, arriving February 16, 1864. Moved to Brashear City, La., February 20, 1864; then to Franklin February 21. Red River Campaign March 10-May 22. Advance from Franklin to Alexandria March 14–26. Battle of Sabine Cross Roads April 8. Battle of Pleasant Hill April 9. Monett's Bluff, Cane River Crossing, April 23. At Alexandria April 25-May 13. Construction of dam at Alexandria April 30-May 10. Retreat to Morganza May 13–22. Mansura May 16. Duty at Morganza until July 2. Absorbed 10th Maine Battalion May 30. Moved to New Orleans, then to Washington, D.C., July 2–13. Snicker's Gap Expedition July 14–23. Sheridan's Shenandoah Valley Campaign August 7-November 28. Berryville August 21 and September 3–4. Battle of Opequon, Winchester, September 19. Fisher's Hill September 22. Battle of Cedar Creek October 19. Duty near Middletown until November 9. At Newton until December 30, and at Stevenson's Depot until April 1865. Moved to Washington, D.C., and duty there April 22 to June 1. While transferring by rail from the Shenandoah Valley to Washington, D.C., shortly after changing tracks at the Relay House, the regiment's train was pulled onto a siding to allow Lincoln's funeral train to pass. Provost duty during the Grand Review of the Armies May 23–24. Moved to Savannah, Ga., June 1–5, then to Georgetown, S.C., June 14–15. Duty at various points in South Carolina, with headquarters at Darlington, until March 1866. Moved to Hilton Head, S.C., March 27, and duty there until June 21. (A detachment at Helena and Seabrook Islands.)

== Casualties ==
The regiment lost a total of 237 men during service; 2 officers and 40 enlisted men killed or mortally wounded, 4 officers and 191 enlisted men due to disease.

== Lineage ==
The 1st Maine Infantry Regiment was originally formed in state service in 1854 as the 1st Regiment of Light Infantry of the Maine Volunteer Militia, and thus was older than any other Maine regimental organization. (The 1st Light Infantry was, in turn, descendant from the Cumberland County Regiment formed in 1760.)

The 1st Maine Infantry was mustered into Federal service in May 1861, served in the defense of Washington, D.C. and was mustered out in August 1861. That same month, the 10th Maine Volunteer Infantry Regiment was formed with a majority of its soldiers being veterans of the 1st Maine. In 1863 the bulk of the 10th Maine was mustered out except for three companies of soldiers who had enlisted for three, rather than two, years and the unit was known as the 10th Maine Battalion. The soldiers of the 10th Maine Battalion were absorbed into the 29th Maine (formed in December 1863) in May 1864. Many soldiers who had served in the 10th Maine Regiment re-enlisted in the 29th Maine. This was the basis of the claim that the 1st, 10th and 29th Maine Regiments were, effectively, the same unit.

An historian of the 240th AAA (Anti-Aircraft Artillery) Group, a former Maine Army National Guard unit, has concluded that numerous subsequent Volunteer Maine Militia and Maine National Guard units, including the 29th Maine, inherited the lineage of the 1st Maine via the Portland Light Infantry company. From 1924 through 1944 this lineage was carried by the 240th Coast Artillery Regiment. As of 2018 this lineage is carried by the 240th Regional Training Institute, Maine Army National Guard, in Bangor.

The 29th Maine is also one of the "ancestor" units, along with the famed 20th Maine Volunteer Infantry Regiment, of the modern day 133rd Engineer Battalion of the Maine Army National Guard.

== Commanders ==
- Colonel George Lafayette Beal – December 17, 1863 – April 19, 1864 (reassigned as brigade commander)
- Lieutenant Colonel Charles S. Emerson (acting commander) – April 19, 1864 – August 27, 1864 (relieved due to illness)
- Major William Knowlton – August 27, 1864 – September 20, 1864 (died of wounds received at Opequon)
- Colonel George H. Nye – September 20, 1864 – June 29, 1866 (mustered out with the regiment)

== See also ==
- List of Maine Civil War units
- Maine in the American Civil War
- 1st Maine Volunteer Infantry Regiment
- 10th Maine Volunteer Infantry Regiment
