= 10th Maine Infantry Regiment =

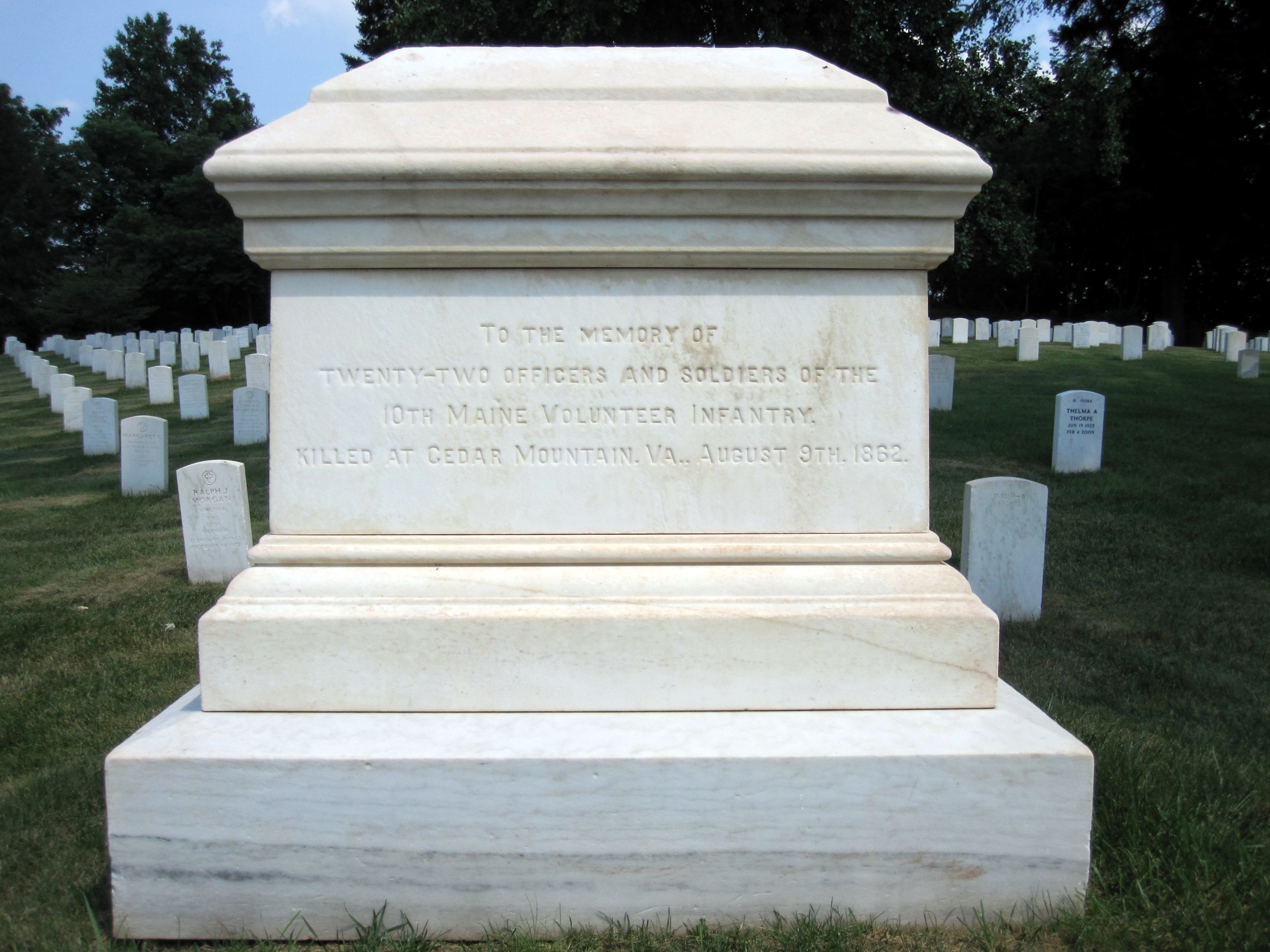
- 10th Maine Volunteer Infantry Regiment Memorial at Culpeper National Cemetery
- Active: June 4, 1861 – May 8, 1863
- Disbanded: May 8, 1863
- Country: United States
- Allegiance: Union
- Branch: Infantry
- Size: Regiment
- Mascot(s): Major (a dog)
- Engagements: Battle of Cedar Mountain; Battle of Antietam; Battle of Chancellorsville (10th Maine Battalion); Battle of Gettysburg (10th Maine Battalion)

Commanders
- Colonel: George Lafayette Beal

The 10th Maine Infantry Regiment was mustered in for two years of service at Portland, Maine, on October 4, 1861, by then-Major Seth Eastman. It was mustered out on May 8, 1863, also at Portland. The regimental commander was Colonel George Lafayette Beal. The 10th Maine was a re-organization of the 1st Maine Infantry, a regiment primarily composed of men with two-year enlistments that was mustering out after completing three months of Federal service. Eight companies of the 1st Maine were retained in service, with Companies A and D replaced by newly recruited companies.

A fraction of the regiment consisted of three-year enlistees, who formed the three-company 10th Maine Infantry Battalion (Cos. A, B, and D) upon the discharge of the two-year enlistees on April 26, 1863. The 10th Maine Battalion served as headquarters guard for the XII Corps at the Battle of Chancellorsville and as part of the Army of the Potomac's provost guard at the Battle of Gettysburg.

The 10th Maine Battalion was detached from the XII Corps at Tullahoma, Tennessee, on February 29, 1864, to be amalgamated with the 29th Maine Infantry. On May 29, 1864, the battalion reached Morganza, Louisiana (aka Morganzia) and was dissolved to form Companies A and D of the 29th Maine, where the soldiers were again commanded by Colonel Beal who was appointed as commander of the 29th Maine.

The regiment's history, History of the 1st-10th-29th Maine Regiment, was written by Major John Mead Gould. The unit's flags are preserved in the Maine State Museum.

== Record ==
- Jackson's Valley Campaign, May 15 – June 17, 1862
- Battle of Cedar Mountain, August 9, 1862
- Northern Virginia Campaign, August 16 – September 2, 1862
- Battle of Antietam, September 17, 1862
- Battle of Chancellorsville (10th Maine Battalion only), May 1–5, 1863
- Battle of Gettysburg (10th Maine Battalion only), July 1–3, 1863
- Transferred to 29th Maine Infantry, May 29, 1864

== Detailed Service ==
Organized at Portland, Maine, and mustered in on October 4, 1861. Left State for Baltimore, Md, October 6. Attached to Dix's Division to November, 1861. Railroad Brigade, Army of the Potomac, to April, 1862. 1st Brigade, Williams' Division, Dept. of the Shenandoah, to June, 1862. 1st Brigade, 1st Division, II Corps, Army of Virginia, to September, 1862. 1st Brigade, 1st Division, XII Corps, Army of the Potomac, to April, 1863. Headquarters XII Corps, Armies of the Potomac and Cumberland, to February, 1864.

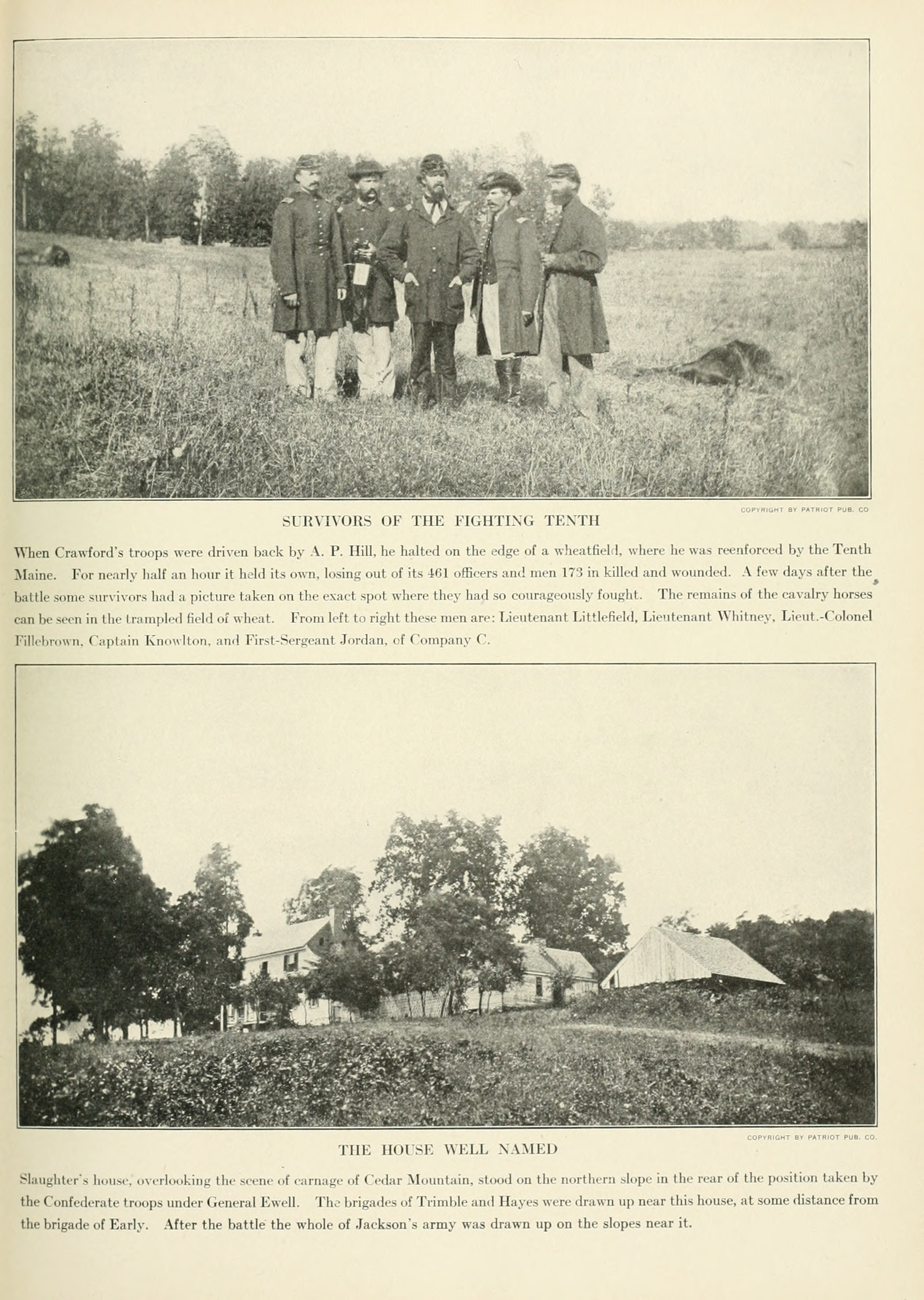
"Survivors of the Fighting Tenth" (from the Photographic History of The Civil War)

SERVICE.--Duty at Baltimore, Md., until November 4, 1861. At Relay House until November 27, and at Baltimore until February 27, 1862. Guard duty by detachments along Baltimore & Ohio Railroad between Martinsburg and Charleston, W. Va., until May. Company "D" at Harper's Ferry until May 24, then moved to Winchester. Company "F" at Harper's Ferry until May 9, then moved to Winchester. Company "H" at Duffield's until May 24, then moved to Winchester. Company "K" at Kearneysville until May 24, then moved to Winchester. Company "C" at Van Obeiseville until May 9, then moved to Winchester. Company "A" at Opequan Bridge until May 24, then moved to Winchester. Company "B" at Martinsburg until May 24, then moved to Winchester. Company "E" at Halltown until May 9, then moved to Winchester. Companies "G" and "I" at Charleston until May 9, then moved to Winchester. All Companies at their stations from March 28. Operations in Shenandoah Valley May 15-June 17. Middletown May 24. Winchester May 25. Retreat to Williamsport May 25–27. Reconnaissance toward Martinsburg May 28. Reconnaissance to Luray C. H. June 29–30. Battle of Cedar Mountain August 9. Pope's Campaign in Northern Virginia August 16-September 2. Guarding trains during Second Bull Run battle. Battle of Antietam, Md., September 16–17. Duty at Berlin, Md. (now Brunswick), October 3-December 10. March to Fairfax Station December 10–14, and duty there until January 19, 1863. March to Stafford C. H. January 19–23, and duty there until April 27. Ordered to rear for muster out April 27.

Three-year men formed into a battalion of three companies (A, B, and D) and assigned to duty at Headquarters XII Corps April 26 as the 10th Maine Infantry Battalion. Old members mustered out May 8, 1863, at Portland, Maine. Chancellorsville Campaign April 27-May 6. Battle of Chancellorsville May 1–5. Gettysburg (Pa.) Campaign June 13-July 24. Provost duty at Battle of Gettysburg July 1–3. Along the Rapidan August 1-September 24. Moved to Nashville, Tenn., September 24-October 2; to Murfreesboro, Tenn., October 5, thence to Shelbyville and Wartrace. Reopening Tennessee River October 26–29. Provost duty at Headquarters XII Corps until February. Detached from XII Corps at Tullahoma, Tenn. February 29, 1864, to be amalgamated with the 29th Maine Infantry, which occurred May 29, 1864, at Morganza, La.

== Casualties ==
The regiment lost 8 officers and 74 enlisted men killed in action or dying of wounds received in battle. An additional officer and 53 enlisted men died of disease. Total fatalities for the regiment were 136.

== Lineage ==
The companies of the 10th Maine were named as follows:

- A - Saco
- B - Portland Mechanic Blues
- C - Portland Light Guard
- D - Aroostook County
- E - Portland Rifle Guard
- F - Lewiston Light Infantry
- G - Norway Light Infantry
- H - Auburn Artillery
- I - 2nd Co. Portland Rifle Guard
- K - Lewiston Zouaves

The 10th Maine's band was Chandler's Band of Portland, Maine, which is still in existence as of 2021.

The 1st Maine was originally formed in state service in 1854, and thus was older than any other Maine regimental organization. An historian of the 240th AAA (Anti-Aircraft Artillery) Group, a former Maine Army National Guard unit, has concluded that numerous subsequent Volunteer Maine Militia and Maine National Guard units, including the 10th Maine, inherited the lineage of the 1st Maine via the Portland Light Infantry company. In the 10th Maine, this lineage was carried by Company C, which included elements of the disbanded Cos. A and D of the 1st Maine. From 1924 through 1944 this lineage was carried by the 240th Coast Artillery Regiment. As of 2018 this lineage is carried by the 240th Regional Training Institute, Maine Army National Guard, in Bangor.

The 10th Maine is also one of the "ancestor" units, along with the famed 20th Maine Volunteer Infantry Regiment, of the modern day 133rd Engineer Battalion of the Maine Army National Guard.

== Monuments ==
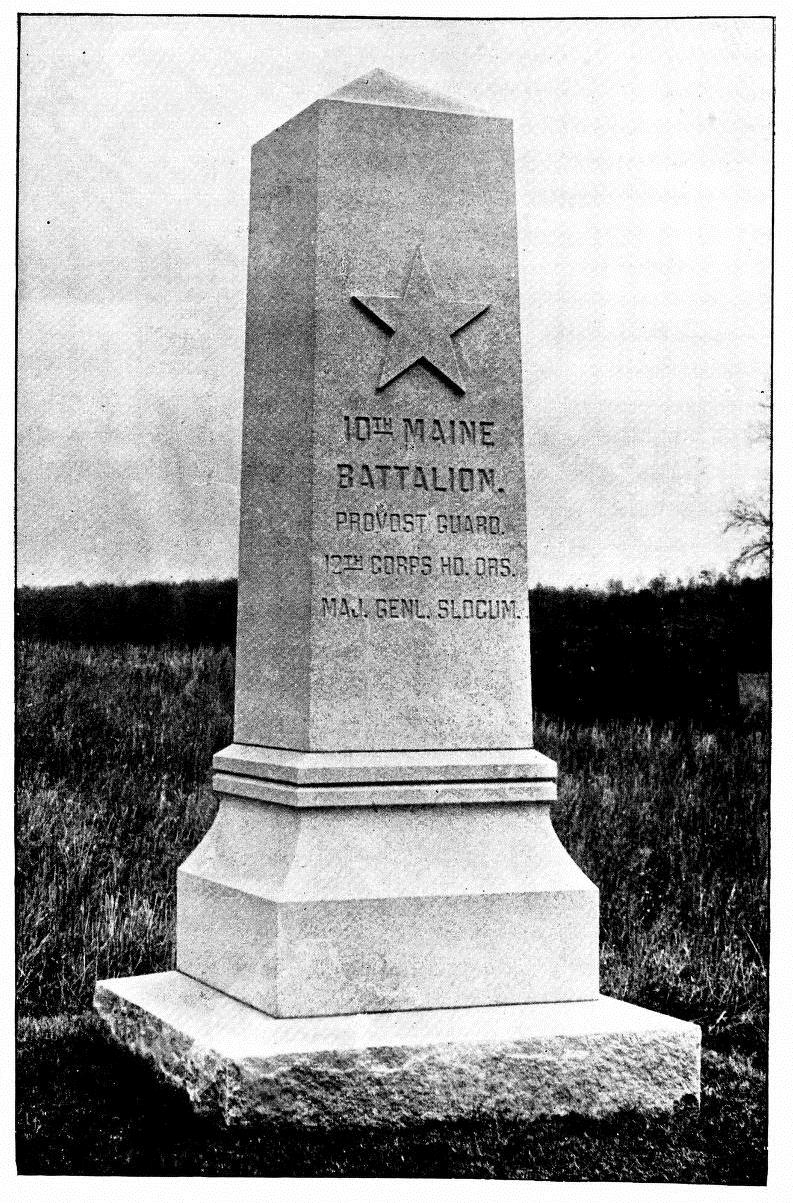
10th Maine Battalion Monument at Gettysburg, PA

Three monuments have been erected to the 10th Maine: one in the Culpeper National Cemetery in Virginia, one on the Cedar Mountain battlefield south of Culpeper, and one to the 10th Maine Battalion on the Gettysburg battlefield in Pennsylvania.

== See also ==
- List of Maine Civil War units
- Maine in the American Civil War
- 1st Maine Volunteer Infantry Regiment
- 29th Maine Volunteer Infantry Regiment
