= George Lafayette Beal =

American politician (1825–1896)

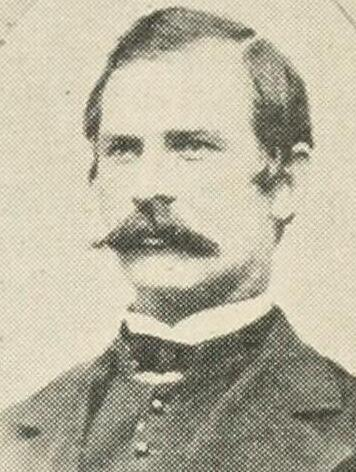
- Portrait of Beal
- Born: May 21, 1825; Norway, Maine
- Died: December 11, 1896 (aged 71); Norway, Maine
- Burial place: Norway Pine Grove Cemetery, Paris, Maine
- Military career
- Allegiance: United States of America; Union
- Branch: United States Army; Union Army
- Service years: 1861–1866
- Rank: Brigadier general Brevet major general
- Commands: 10th Maine Volunteer Infantry Regiment; 29th Maine Volunteer Infantry Regiment
- Conflicts: American Civil War; Jackson's Valley Campaign; Second Battle of Bull Run; Battle of Antietam; Red River Campaign; Valley Campaigns of 1864
- Other work: Adjutant General of Maine; Pension Agent; State Treasurer of Maine

George Lafayette Beal (May 21, 1825 – December 11, 1896) was an American politician from the state of Maine who served in the Union Army during the American Civil War.

== Early life and background ==
Beal was born in Norway, Maine. His father was one of the founders of the town. Beal studied at the Westbrook Seminary and was interested in military affairs, eventually being elected captain of the local militia unit known as the Norway Light Infantry, a position he held at the beginning of the war. He was employed as an agent of the Canadian Express Company.

== Civil War ==
Beal was the first man in Oxford County to enlist, and his militia unit became Company "G" of the First Maine Infantry Regiment, a three-month unit. At the end of his enlistment, he re-enlisted and was commissioned colonel of the 10th Maine Infantry. The unit was engaged during Stonewall Jackson's valley campaign in 1862, including the Battle of Cedar Mountain. Beal was commended for the 10th Maine's service covering the retreat of Maj. Gen. Nathaniel Banks' Army of Virginia, and later at Second Bull Run, and Antietam, where Beal was severely wounded. Beal was mustered out with his regiment on May 8, 1863.

On December 17, 1863, Beal was commissioned as the colonel of the 29th Maine Infantry, in the XIX Corps, and took part in the Red River Campaign in Louisiana, and later Sheridan's Shenandoah Valley campaign in 1864.

He became a brigade commander on April 19, 1864, relieving James W. McMillan, while retaining command of the 29th Maine. He received a brevet promotion to brigadier general of U. S. Volunteers on August 22, 1864, and was replaced as commander of the 29th Maine by Colonel George H. Nye on October 4, 1864. For gallant service at the Battle of Cedar Creek, he was promoted to full brigadier general of U. S. Volunteers on November 30, 1864. His brigade had been first to advance and break the enemy's lines during the turning point of the battle.

He was assigned to duty in North Carolina in 1865. Following the war, he was breveted to major general (on or retroactive to March 13, 1865) and assigned command of the eastern district of South Carolina during the Reconstruction era. He was mustered out of service in January 1866 and returned to Maine.

== Postbellum career ==
Beal became active in politics and was a delegate to the Republican National Convention which nominated General Grant for president in 1868, in which Beal was a presidential elector from Maine. In 1872, he was appointed as a pension agent at Portland, Maine.

He served as commander of the Department of Maine of the Grand Army of the Republic. He also served as commander of the Maine Commandery of the Military Order of the Loyal Legion of the United States.

In 1880, he became adjutant general of the Maine state militia, and served until 1885. In 1888, he was elected state treasurer as a Republican and served until 1894. He died in 1896 from heart disease.

== Dates of rank ==
- Captain, Company G, 1st Maine Volunteer Infantry – April 14, 1861
- Mustered into Federal service – May 3, 1861
- Mustered out of Federal service – August 2, 1861
- Colonel, 10th Maine Volunteer Infantry – October 3, 1861
- Mustered out of Federal service – May 8, 1863
- Colonel, 29th Maine Volunteer Infantry – December 17, 1863
- Brevet brigadier general, Volunteers – August 22, 1864
- Brigadier general, Volunteers – November 13, 1864
- Brevet major general, Volunteers – March 13, 1865
- Mustered out of Federal service – January 15, 1866

== See also ==
- List of American Civil War generals (Union)

Political offices
Preceded by Edwin C. Burleigh	Maine State Treasurer; 1888-1894	Succeeded by F. Marion Simpson
