= 103rd Infantry Regiment (United States) =

103rd Infantry Regiment (2nd Maine)
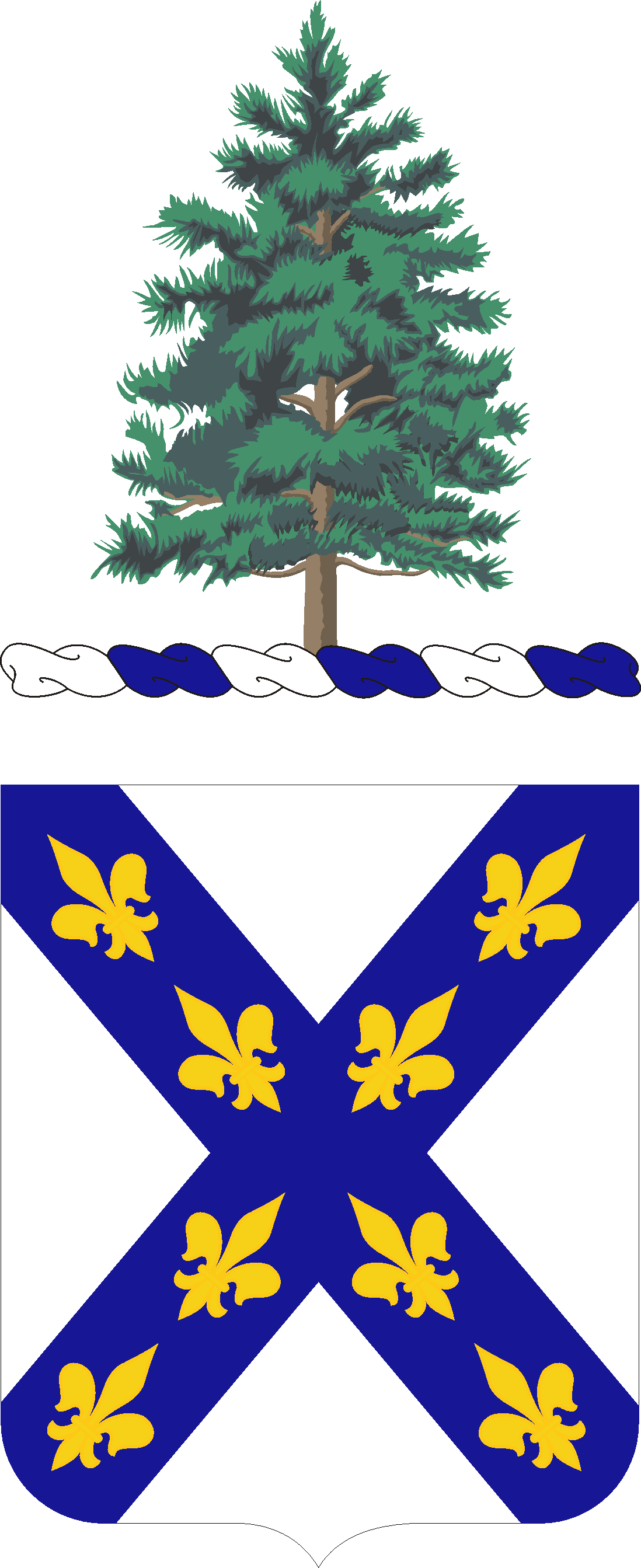
- Coat of arms
- Active: 1861–63; 1916–19; 1922-45; 1946-59
- Country: United States
- Allegiance: New England; Maine, New Hampshire, Vermont, Massachusetts, and Rhode Island.
- Branch: Army National Guard
- Type: Infantry
- Motto: To the Last Man
- Colors: Blue, gold, and white.
- Engagements: American Civil War: First Battle of Bull Run; Peninsula Campaign; Battle of 2nd Bull Run; Battle of Antietam; Battle of Fredericksburg; Battle of Chancellorsville; World War I: Champagne-Marne; Aisne-Marne; Battle of Saint-Mihiel; Meuse-Argonne Offensive; World War II: Battle of Guadalcanal; New Georgia Campaign; New Guinea; Luzon

Commanders
- Notable commanders: Charles Davis Jameson, Charles W. Roberts

Insignia
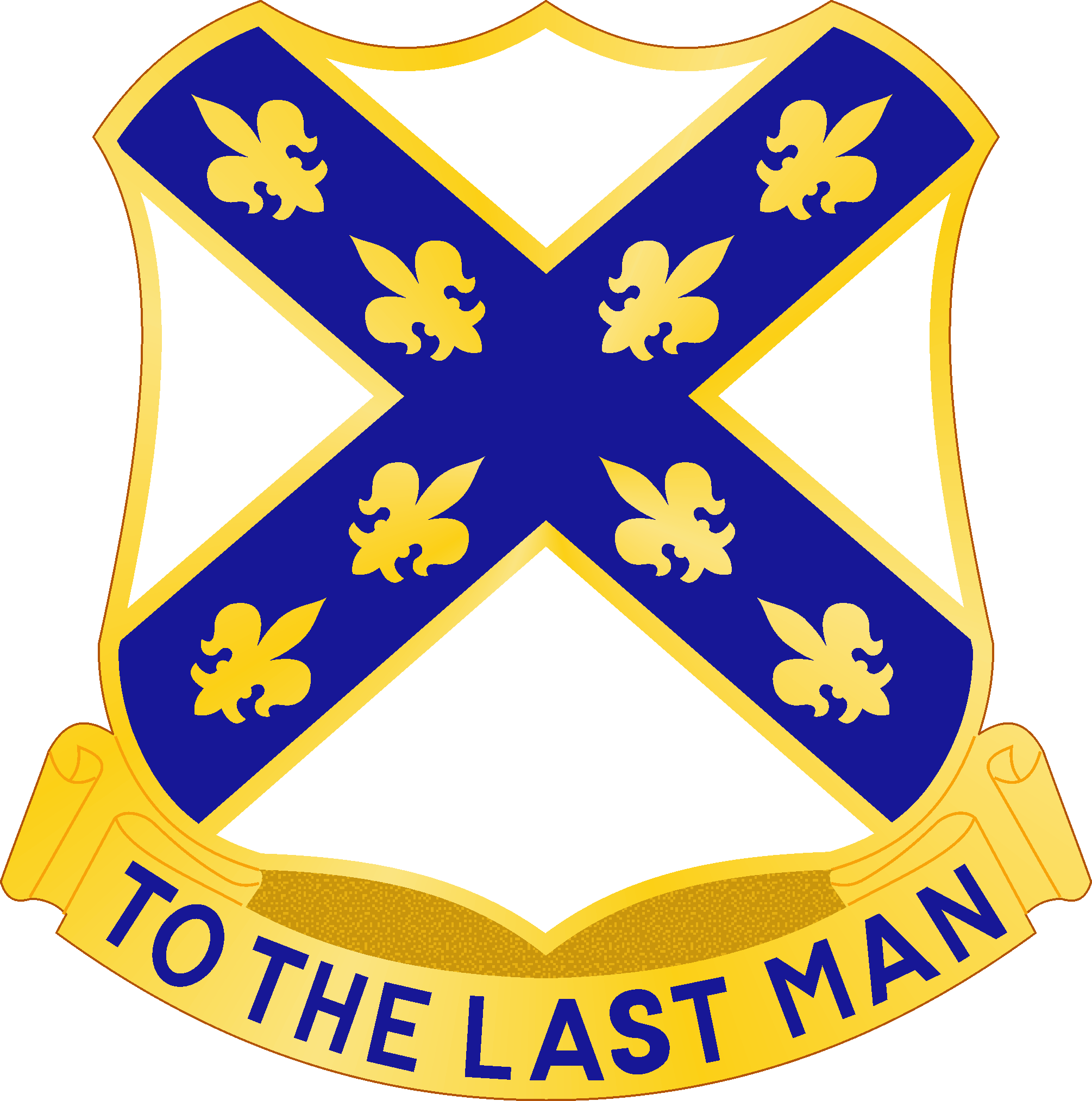
- Distinctive unit insignia

The 103rd Infantry Regiment was an infantry regiment of the United States Army that served in combat in the American Civil War, World War I, and World War II. It was an Army National Guard regiment from the states making up New England, but most of its soldiers came from Maine. It was a part of the 26th Infantry Division and the 43rd Infantry Division. During the Cold War, the regiment was converted into an armored regiment, and its lineage is presently perpetuated by an engineer battalion in the Maine Army National Guard.

== History ==
=== American Civil War ===
The 103rd Infantry Regiment was originally formed in 1861 as the 2nd Maine Volunteer Infantry Regiment. It served in the Union Army and was one of the first US regiments to see combat against the Confederates. It served in the First Battle of Bull Run, which was the first major battle of the Civil War and a decisive Union defeat. However, the 2nd Maine was one of the last regiments to retreat from the field. It served in the Peninsula Campaign and the Second Battle of Bull Run, both were also Union defeats. At the Battle of Antietam on 17 September 1862, the 2nd Maine experienced its first victory, but this was to be short lived. At the later Battle of Fredericksburg, the 2nd Maine would suffer its highest casualties of the war. The regiment was also present for the Union defeat at the Battle of Chancellorsville, and were mustered out of service one month later. Most of the soldiers had enlisted for two years, but those who'd enlisted for three were sent to the 20th Maine Volunteer Infantry Regiment to finish their wartime service.

=== World War I ===
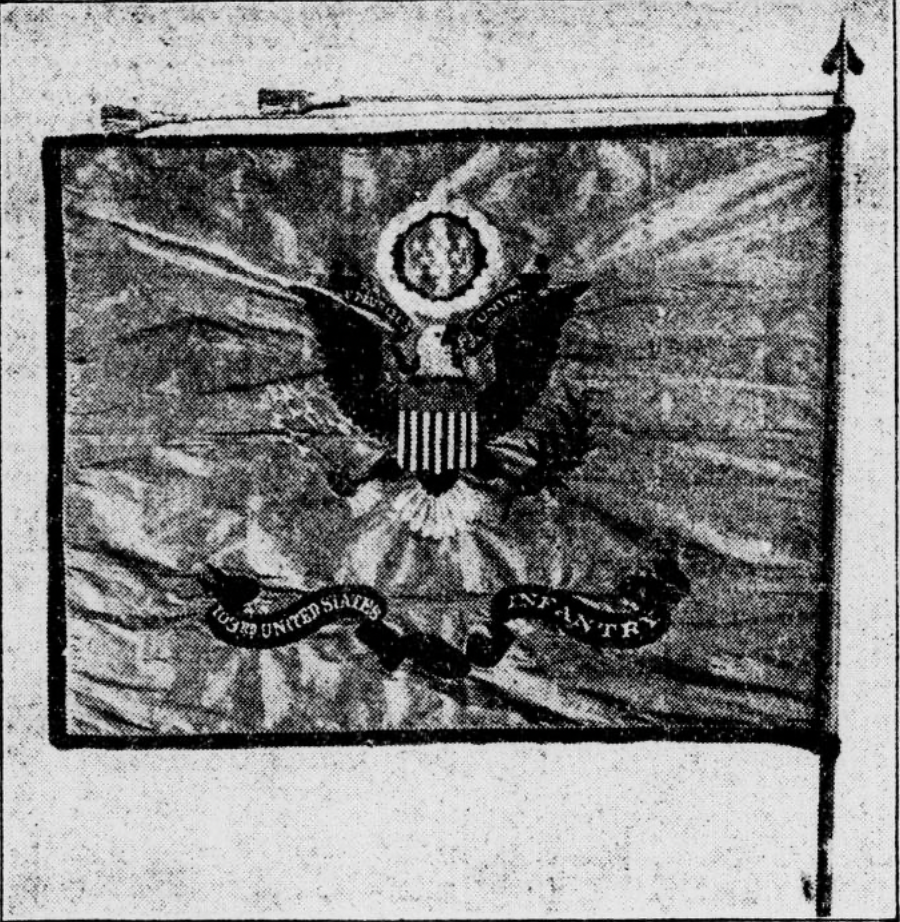
Regimental flag, 1916

The 2nd Maine was recalled into Federal Service on 18 June 1916, and served along the Mexico–United States border in Texas to guard against hostile raids. On 13 April 1917, elements of the 1st New Hampshire Volunteer Infantry were merged into the 2nd Maine to create the 103rd Infantry Regiment. The new regiment was placed in the 52nd Infantry Brigade (alongside the 104th Infantry Regiment) as part of the 26th Infantry Division, the "Yankee Division." The regiment served on the Western Front and was one of the first National Guard units in combat during the war. The 103rd served in the Champagne-Marne campaign where they had their first real taste of fighting, and went on to fight gallantly in the Aisne-Marne. The bloodied New Englanders continued the fight at the Battle of Saint-Mihiel, and in the momentous Meuse-Argonne Offensive, the largest and bloodiest operation of the war for the American Expeditionary Forces.

=== Interwar period ===
The 103rd Infantry arrived at the port of Boston on 6 April 1919 on the USS America and was demobilized 28 April 1919 at Camp Devens, Massachusetts. Per the terms of the National Defense Act of 1920, the 103rd Infantry was reconstituted in the National Guard in 1921, assigned to the 43rd Division, and allotted to the state of Maine. The regiment was reorganized on 22 November 1921 at Farmington, Maine, by consolidation of the 2nd and 3rd Infantry Regiments, Maine National Guard, and designated as the 171st Infantry; it was redesignated as the 103rd Infantry on 31 December 1921. The regimental headquarters was relocated in 1922 to Portland, Maine. The regiment conducted annual summer training most years at Camp Keyes, Augusta, Maine, and some years at Camp Devens or Fort Ethan Allen, Vermont. The regiment was inducted into active federal service on 24 February 1941 and moved to Camp Blanding, Florida, where it arrived on 13 March 1941.

=== World War II ===
When called into service for World War II, the 103rd became part of the 43rd Infantry Division, the "Winged Victory" Division. After finishing training at Camp Shelby, Mississippi, they were sent to the Pacific Theater to fight against the Empire of Japan. They embarked for New Zealand on 1 October 1942, and arrived at Auckland three weeks later. The first combat operations undertaken by the regiment were in early 1943 on Guadalcanal. The Japanese had ended all organized resistance but mopping up operations were conducted to root out stubborn stragglers. The first major action the 103rd Infantry took part in began on 22 June 1943 in the New Georgia Campaign. The New England infantrymen did battle with the Japanese and the jungle alike, and many men fell to disease. Here, the soldiers "were soon introduced to the harsh realities of jungle warfare". The battle was tough for the new regiment and they became bogged down in the dense jungle by the savage fighting against the enemy. The 43rd Division made a westward advance against the Japanese airfield at Munda and covered the southern (coastal) flank of the drive. The Battle of Munda Point was extremely bloody for the regiment; progress was slow and casualties were high, but eventually the area was captured on 5 August 1943, effectively ending all organized Japanese resistance on the island. The 103rd saw extensive and bloody combat at New Georgia and was sent to New Guinea to act as a reserve unit during the New Guinea Campaign, where it saw minor action as a supporting element.

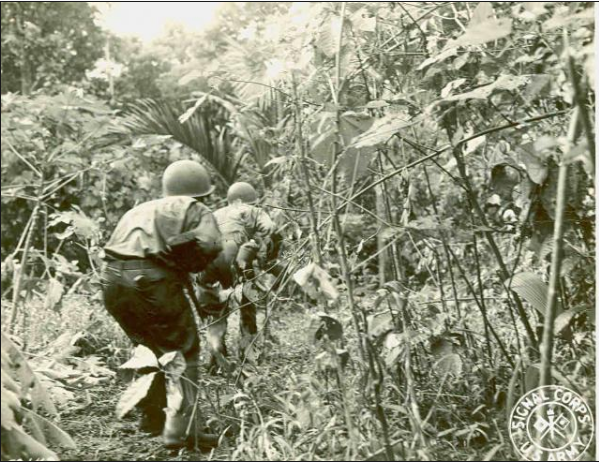
103rd Infantry Regiment soldiers, Battle of New Georgia, World War II

In the Philippines, the 103rd Infantry Regiment landed on the island of Luzon on 9 January 1945 and was one of the leading elements during the Battle of Luzon. As the left wing of the invasion force, they pushed inland, encountering stiff opposition from fanatical Japanese enemies. The 103rd fought for about a month in the breakout operations from Lingayen, and finally received a week long rest in February. They were sent back to the front to mount a surprise attack against the Japanese Shimbu Line. They then moved into the highlands region of the island and engaged the enemy in fighting that was often cave-to-cave. On 9 May 1945, they secured the Ipo Dam from the enemy, which controlled roughly 30% of Manila's water. Both the 103rd Infantry and the 152nd Field Artillery Regiment (both from the Maine Army National Guard) received the Philippine Republic Presidential Unit Citation for their daring actions during the Battle of Luzon.

=== Cold War ===
In 1959, the regiment was consolidated with the 703rd Antiaircraft Artillery Battalion, and the consolidated unit was converted into an armored cavalry regiment, becoming the 103d Armored Cavalry Regiment. In 1961, the regiment became the 20th Armor Regiment. In 1967, the 20th Armor Regiment was converted and redesignated as the 133rd Engineer Battalion, which carries on the lineage of the 103rd Infantry Regiment.
