= 1st Maine Infantry Regiment =

- Flag of the United States, 1861–1863
- Active: 3 May 1861 to 5 August 1861; 26 May to 5 October 1898
- Country: United States
- Allegiance: Union
- Branch: Infantry
- Engagements: American Civil War; Spanish–American War

Commanders
- Colonel: Nathaniel J. Jackson

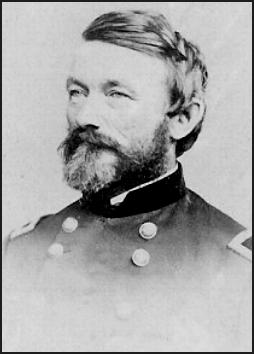
Colonel Nathaniel J. Jackson of the 1st Maine Infantry

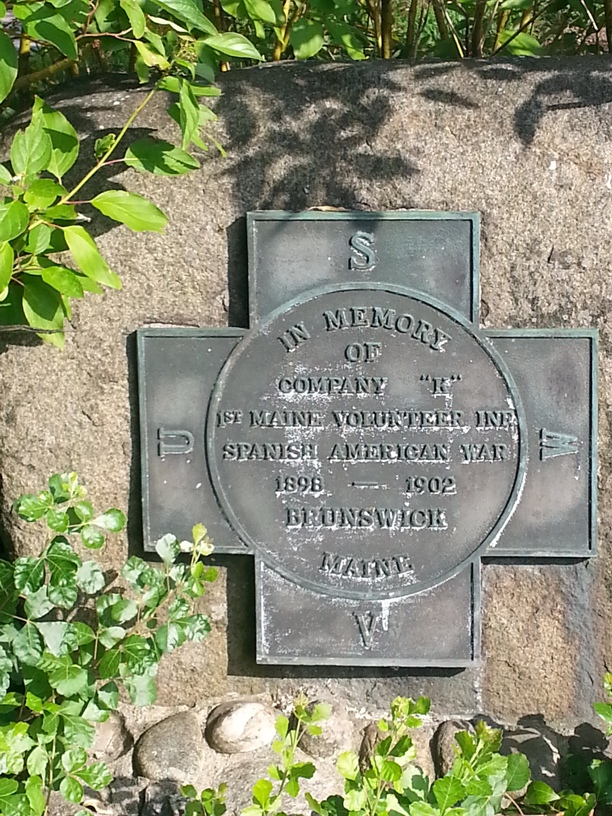
Memorial to Company K of the First Maine Volunteer Infantry in the Spanish–American War, Brunswick, Maine

The 1st Maine Infantry Regiment was an infantry regiment that served in the Union Army during the American Civil War. It was later re-activated in 1898 for the Spanish–American War, but did not serve overseas.

== Service ==
=== Pre-Civil War ===
In 1847, during the Mexican-American War, President James K. Polk requested that a regiment of Maine infantry be mobilized for field duty. This was accomplished on paper, but field officers were never assigned and the regiment's companies never trained together. However, this partial mobilization and the influence of the Crimean War of 1853–56 created military enthusiasm in Maine, and as a result new militia companies to be organized in 1854–56. In 1854 there were 58 companies in the Volunteer Maine Militia, and the request of the companies in and near Portland to be named the 1st Regiment was granted by orders of the Maine state government approved 21 June 1854. General Smith of the 5th Division was ordered to carry out the plan. In 1856, 47 of the 56 volunteer companies of the state were disbanded, having lost interest in military affairs. However, the First Regiment continued from 1856 to 1859, though without annual training as a regiment.

=== Civil War ===
Abraham Lincoln's first call for volunteers in April, 1861 required Maine to raise one regiment of infantry for three months of Federal service. This was done by reorganizing ten existing companies of the state militia, completed at Portland, Maine on 28 April 1861 and mustered into service on 3 May 1861, a total of 779 soldiers. The regimental commander was Colonel Nathaniel Jackson.

The First Maine was transferred to Washington, D.C. on 1 June 1861, where it remained until 1 August 1861, encamped on Meridian Hill. It spent its entire service in the Washington defenses and saw no combat. They were mustered out on 5 August 1861.

Although the regiment's required Federal service was only three months, all of the soldiers had enlisted for two or three years. Many soldiers in the regiment who were required to remain in service joined the 10th Maine Volunteer Infantry Regiment, which retained eight of the 1st Maine's ten companies.

The regimental history was published as History of the 1st-10th-29th Maine Regiment written by Major John Mead Gould.

=== Spanish–American War ===
The regiment was mustered into the service of the United States at Augusta, Maine on 26 May 1898, with 46 officers and 979 enlisted men. The regiment moved to Chickamauga, Georgia, then a mobilization center. On 31 May it was assigned to Third Brigade, Second Division, Third Army Corps. The regiment did not deploy further and returned to Augusta, Maine 23–27 August after three months' service. On 21 September the regiment was furloughed for 30 days, and on 25 October the regiment's components began to muster out after five months' service. This was completed on 13 December with 46 officers and 1,211 enlisted men mustered out. A memorial plaque for Company K of the 1st Maine in the Spanish–American War is in a park near Bowdoin College in Brunswick, Maine. Dana T. Merrill, a brigadier general in the United States Army, began his career by enlisting in Company H in 1898. Brigadier General Alfred A. Starbird began his career by enlisting in Company D.

== Casualties ==
The regiment lost no men during its brief period of service in the Civil War. In the Spanish–American War the unit lost two officers and 39 enlisted men to disease and 24 enlisted men to desertion.

== Lineage ==
The companies of the 1st Maine in the Civil War were named as follows:

- A – Portland Light Infantry
- B – Portland Mechanic Blues
- C – Portland Light Guards
- D – Portland Rifle Corps
- E – Portland Rifle Guards
- F – Lewiston Light Infantry
- G – Norway Light Infantry
- H – Auburn Artillery
- I – 2nd Co. Portland Rifle Guards
- K – Lewiston Zouaves

The 1st Maine was originally formed in state service in 1854, and thus was older than any other Maine regimental organization. An historian of the 240th AAA (Anti-Aircraft Artillery) Group, a former Maine Army National Guard unit, has concluded that numerous subsequent Volunteer Maine Militia and Maine National Guard units inherited the lineage of the 1st Maine via the Portland Light Infantry company. From 1924 through 1944 this was the 240th Coast Artillery Regiment. As of 2018 this lineage is carried by the 240th Regional Training Institute, Maine Army National Guard, in Bangor.

The 1st Maine is also one of the "ancestor" units, along with the famed 20th Maine Volunteer Infantry Regiment, of the modern day 133rd Engineer Battalion of the Maine Army National Guard.

== See also ==
- List of Maine Civil War units
- Maine in the American Civil War
- 10th Maine Volunteer Infantry Regiment
- 29th Maine Volunteer Infantry Regiment
