= 133rd Engineer Battalion =

U.S. military unit

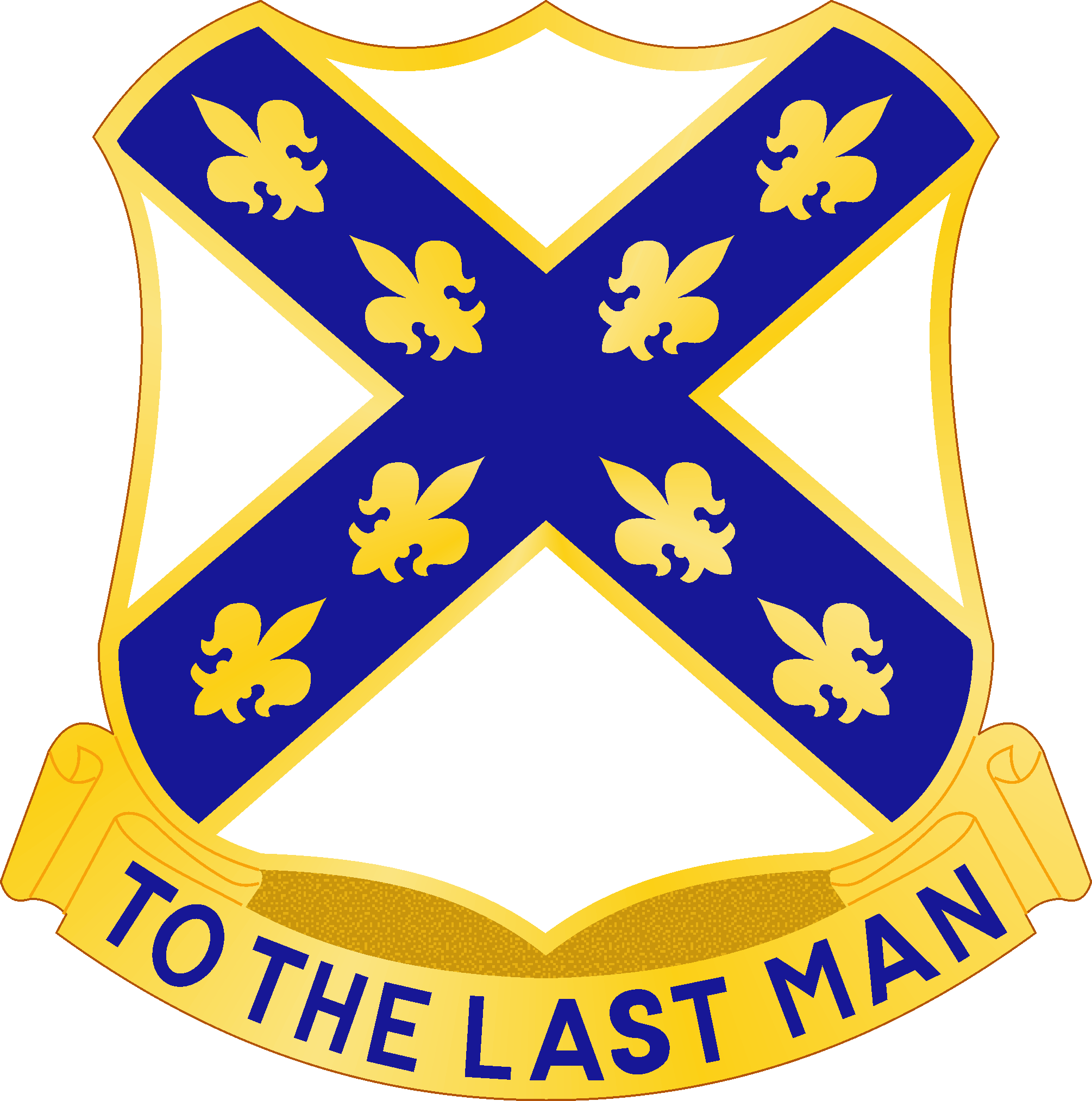
- Distinctive unit insignia of the 133rd Engineer Battalion
- Active: 1803–present
- Country: United States
- Branch: National Guard
- Type: Battalion
- Role: Engineer Battalion
- Part of: Maine Army National Guard
- Nicknames: Maine's Regiment; Twentieth Maine
- Motto: To the Last Man
- Engagements: War of 1812; American Civil War; Battle of the Wilderness; Battle of Chancellorsville; Battle of Fredericksburg; Seven Days Battles; Red River campaign; World War I; Battle of Lorraine; Second Battle of the Marne; Battle of Saint-Mihiel; Third Battle of the Aisne; Meuse–Argonne offensive; World War II; Pacific Theater; Korean War; Operation Iraqi Freedom; Operation Enduring Freedom
- Decorations: Meritorious Unit Commendation

Commanders
- Commander: LTC Donald Lachapelle
- Command Sergeant Major: CSM Heath Bouffard
- Notable commanders: Adelbert Ames; Joshua L. Chamberlain

The 133rd Engineer Battalion is a military engineering unit of the Maine Army National Guard.

The battalion is one of the oldest units in the organization, with lineage tracing back to nineteenth-century militia formations in the state.

The unit consists of horizontal and vertical construction companies, a combat engineer company, a forward support company, a survey and design detachment, and a headquarters company.

== History ==
The 133rd Engineer Battalion is the oldest unit in the Maine Army National Guard and has campaign credit for the American Revolution and the War of 1812. Informally known as "Maine's Regiment", the 133rd traces its beginnings back to the formation of the Cumberland County Regiment of the Massachusetts Militia in 1760 and its subordinate element, the Portland Light Infantry, in 1804. The Portland Light Infantry manned the defenses around Portland, such as Forts Preble and Scammell, to prevent a British attack in 1814 during the War of 1812.

Other militia units flooded into Portland that year, responding to a British invasion from the north that had seized Bangor and Castine. The British had taken control of portions of Maine and re-established the crown colony of New Ireland. In 1814, several thousand British troops assembled in Castine, with seven ships of the line, intent on taking Portland. However, after a few skirmishes on the outskirts of town with American militia units, the British decided that an attack would be too costly and cancelled the invasion.

=== Civil War ===
When the U.S. Civil War began in 1861, the Portland Light Infantry was designated as Company A of the 1st Maine Volunteer Infantry Regiment, a 90-day regiment, and marched to Virginia. However, it was not engaged in the Battle of Bull Run. The 1st Maine was mustered out of service on August 5, 1861.

Many members of the 1st Maine Volunteer Infantry reenlisted as members of the 10th Maine Volunteer Infantry Regiment when it was formed in October 1861. It fought at the battles of Cedar Mountain and Antietam in 1862. Most enlistments in the 10th Maine expired on May 8, 1863, except for 3 companies of "three year men," who were retained in service as the 10th Maine Battalion. The 10th Maine Battalion served as the Provost Guard for the Army of the Potomac at the Battle of Gettysburg. The 29th Maine Volunteer Infantry Regiment was mustered into service on December 17, 1863, and was transferred to the southern theater, fighting in Louisiana in the Red River Campaign from March to May 1864 and then in Virginia from July 1864 to April 1865. On May 29, 1864, the 10th Maine Battalion was consolidated with the 29th Maine, thus establishing continuity with the 10th Maine Regiment and the 1st Maine Regiment. The 29th Maine served on occupation duty in South Carolina, starting in June 1865, and was mustered out of service on June 21, 1866.

The 2nd Maine Volunteer Infantry Regiment was called into service at the same time as the 1st and saw action during the Seven Days Battles, 2nd Bull Run, Antietam, Fredericksburg, and Chancellorsville. The regiment's enlistments ran up in 1863, but about half the unit had signed papers to serve for the three years, so they were amalgamated into the 20th Maine Volunteer Infantry Regiment.

In 1862, the 20th Maine Volunteer Infantry Regiment was raised from the Brewer area. The regiment saw limited action at Antietam but participated in the Battle of Fredericksburg, where they were part of the assault element that aimed to take the Confederate defenses on the high ground. The 20th sustained heavy casualties and was pinned down for over twenty-four hours under enemy fire in the cold December weather. They were positioned on the far left of the Union line at the Battle of Gettysburg in 1863 and sustained multiple enemy attacks until the regiment had nearly run out of ammunition. They had been ordered to hold to the last man, and the regimental commander, Colonel Joshua L. Chamberlain, gave the order, "Bayonet, Forward!", knowing that he could not withdraw or the enemy would outflank the Union forces. The bayonet charge took the Confederates by surprise and ended their attacks entirely. For his actions, Colonel Chamberlain was awarded the Medal of Honor. The 20th would serve until the end of the war, fighting with distinction in the savage battles through Virginia, such as the Wilderness, Spotsylvania, and Petersburg. The 133rd Engineer Battalion carries on the lineage and traditions of the 20th Maine.

=== 1865-1916 ===
At the end of the war, the soldiers returned to their civilian lives. Many kept up their military experience by becoming members of the 1st Maine Volunteer Militia, organized in 1873. The 1st Maine Volunteer Militia had companies in Portland, Augusta, Skowhegan, Auburn, Norway, Bangor, Belfast, Hampden, and Old Town, laying out the footprint for the future 133rd Engineer Battalion. In 1893, the Maine Volunteer Militia was redesignated as the Maine National Guard, and the 1st Maine Volunteer Militia was designated the 1st Maine Infantry. The 2nd Maine Infantry was also brought under the Maine National Guard when it was formed from the Maine Volunteer Militia in 1893.

In May 1898, the 1st Maine Infantry was mobilized as the 1st Maine Volunteer Infantry for service in the Spanish–American War. It served stateside and was mustered out of service on December 13, 1898.

In 1909, the 1st Maine Volunteer Militia reorganized and redesignated as the Maine Coast Artillery Corps, eventually forming thirteen numbered companies with batteries stationed from Bath to Kittery. In 1917, it was mobilized to protect the Maine coast, manning coast defenses, primarily near Portland. In December 1917, four of the companies were combined with Regular Army companies to form the 54th Artillery (Coast Artillery Corps) and deployed to France, where they fought on the Marne and the Meuse-Argonne Campaigns. The remaining companies remained in Maine until they were demobilized in December 1918.

=== Pancho Villa Expedition and World War I ===
The 2nd Maine Infantry was called into service in 1916 for service on the Texas border during the Pancho Villa Expedition, and then again in 1917 for World War I. There it was combined with a unit from New Hampshire to become the 103rd U.S. Infantry, which was one of the four infantry regiments in the 26th Division (nicknamed the "Yankee Division"). They served on the front lines in France, taking part in the battles of Champagne-Marne, Aisne-Marne, Saint-Mihiel, Meuse-Argonne, Île-de-France, and Lorraine. One soldier, Private First Class George Dilboy, was posthumously awarded the Medal of Honor for his actions in single-handedly overrunning a German machine gun position.

=== Interwar period ===
==== 103rd Infantry ====
The 103rd Infantry arrived at the port of Boston on April 6, 1919, on the troopship USS America and was demobilized on April 28, 1919, at Camp Devens, Massachusetts. Per the National Defense Act of 1920, it was reconstituted in the National Guard in 1921, assigned to the 43rd Division, and allotted to Maine. It was reorganized on November 22, 1921, at Farmington, Maine, by consolidation of the 2nd and 3rd Infantry Regiments, Maine National Guard, and designated as the 171st Infantry. It was redesignated as the 103rd Infantry on December 31, 1921. The regimental headquarters was relocated in 1922 to Portland, Maine. The regiment conducted annual summer training most years at Camp Keyes, Maine, and some years at Camp Devens, Massachusetts, or Fort Ethan Allen, Vermont. The 103rd Infantry was inducted into active federal service at home stations on February 24, 1941, and moved to Camp Blanding, Florida, where it arrived on March 13, 1941.

==== 240th Coast Artillery ====
The 54th Artillery Regiment, Coast Artillery Corps, was demobilized on March 13, 1919. Coast artillery units were reorganized in the Maine National Guard in 1920–21 with old and new coast defense companies. The companies were designated as the 1st Coast Defense Command, Coast Artillery Corps, and Maine National Guard on May 15, 1922, and assigned to the Harbor Defenses of Portland. The eight National Guard coast defense command headquarters constituted after World War I were, in effect, regimental headquarters for their assigned batteries in their harbor defenses, but their role in mobilization remained unclear. A regimental organization was later formally effected in National Guard coast artillery units, and Maine's 1st Coast Defense Command. became the regimental headquarters of the 240th Artillery Regiment (Harbor Defense), Coast Artillery Corps, which was organized and federally recognized on July 11, 1922, and redesignated as the 240th on September 17, 1923. It was intended to be organized as a 12-battery regiment. Again redesignated on May 14, 1924, as the 240th Coast Artillery Regiment (Harbor Defense), the regiment, or elements thereof, was called up to perform the following state duties: two batteries for relief duties in connection with a major fire in Thurston, Maine, September 15–17, 1924; Batteries C and H for fighting a forest fire in Sagadahoc County, Maine, September 3–13, 1926. Reorganized in 1931 from 12 to 9 batteries and organized as follows; 1st Battalion as harbor defense; 2nd Battalion as 155mm gun, tractor drawn; 3rd Battalion as antiaircraft. Relieved from the Harbor Defenses of Portland on October 1, 1933, and assigned to the General Headquarters Reserve. Reassigned to the Harbor Defenses of Portland in 1938. Conducted annual summer training at Fort Williams, Maine, 1921–40. Inducted into federal service at home stations on September 16, 1940, at Portland, and transferred to Fort McKinley, Maine, arriving there on September 23, 1940, where it assumed the mission of manning batteries in the Harbor Defenses of Portland.

=== World War II ===
As the United States prepared to enter World War II, the 240th Coast Artillery was mobilized to defend Portland on September 16, 1940. On October 7, 1944, the regiment was re-organized into the 185th and 186th Coast Artillery Battalions. On April 1, 1945, the two battalions were consolidated into the Harbor Defenses of Portland, which was inactivated in June 1946.

During World War II, the 103rd Infantry, as an element of the 43rd Infantry Division, served in the Pacific theater, fighting in the battles of Guadalcanal, North Solomons, New Guinea, and Luzon, helping General MacArthur liberate the Philippines. They were the first unit to reach the Ipo Dam, which controlled the water supply for Manila, a crucial step in liberating the city.

=== Post WWII ===
In February 1947, the Coast Artillery units were re-organized and redesignated as the 703rd Anti-Aircraft Gun Battalion. They were mobilized from August 1950 to April 1952 to replace Regular Army units that had deployed to Korea during the Korean War.

On March 1, 1959, Companies A, B, and C of the 703rd AA Bn consolidated with the 103rd Infantry and were reorganized and redesignated as the 103d Armored Cavalry Regiment. Meanwhile, Headquarters and Company D of the 703rd AA Gun Bn were re-organized and redesignated and consolidated with the 314th Anti-Aircraft Artillery Battalion to form 1st Battalion, 240th Artillery. On June 1, 1961, the 103rd Armored Cavalry Regiment, less the headquarters company, was reorganized and redesignated as the 20th Armor Regiment. At the same time, the Headquarters Company of the 103rd Armored Cavalry Regiment was redesignated as Headquarters, 113th Armor Group.

The 240th Artillery was converted, reorganized, and redesignated on June 1, 1961, as the 262nd Engineer Battalion with headquarters at Bangor.

In 1962, the 3rd Battalion, 20th Armor was mobilized for the Berlin Crisis and stood ready at Fort Stewart, Georgia, until the crisis defused. In 1963, the 1st Battalion, 20th Armor was stood up in readiness during the Cuban Missile Crisis but the issues were resolved before the unit had to deploy. The 240th Coast Artillery served until the 1960s before being disbanded, but its lineage was assumed into the 20th Armor.

On December 31, 1967, the 20th Armor consolidated with Headquarters, 113th Armor Group to form the 133rd Engineer Battalion.

On September 1, 1993, the 133rd Engineer Battalion was consolidated with the 262nd Engineer Battalion while retaining its designation as the 133rd Engineer Battalion.

== 133rd Engineer Battalion ==
Since 1970, the 133rd Engineer Battalion has served both in the US for disaster relief missions and abroad in defense of the nation. In 1992, the battalion deployed to Panama to improve infrastructure in rural areas. In 1994, the battalion functioned as Mission Command in support of New Horizons, Task Force Dirigo, in Guatemala, a humanitarian and disaster relief mission. In 1997, units of the 133rd were deployed to Bosnia-Herzegovina in support of Operation Joint Guard.

Following the 2003 invasion of Iraq by a United States-led coalition, the 133rd was mobilized in support of Operation Iraqi Freedom II from 2004 to 2005. The battalion served as the Engineer Task Force for I Corps' Task Force Olympia in the Multi-National Brigade-Northwest Area of Operations. As a battalion, the 133rd completed over 730 troop missions, completed host-nation improvements in excess of 15 million dollars, built over 12 kilometers of earthen berms for force protection, and completed 15 airfield assistance missions. In addition, the 133rd completed 84 humanitarian assistance missions, donating 1,473 boxes of school supplies, clothes, shoes, food, and toys to Iraqi communities as well as building roads, wells and multiple schools and medical clinics. The 133rd Engineer Battalion's area of operations (AO) spanned an area the size of the U.S. northeast, significantly larger than most Engineer battalions' normal span of control in Iraq. The 133rd was awarded the Meritorious Unit Commendation for their participation in the Transition of Iraq and Iraqi Governance Campaigns.

In 2005, members of the 133rd responded to Louisiana to provide security and disaster relief assistance after Hurricane Katrina. Similarly, the 133rd sent Joint Task Force Maine to Vermont in 2011 to assist in Tropical Storm Irene recovery. The 133rd opened several key routes in Vermont that had been closed due to debris or washouts, enabling communities to get assistance.

U.S. Army Specialist Symone Sherrill, an engineer with the 150th Engineer Company, New Jersey Army National Guard, assigned to the 133rd Engineer Battalion, Maine Army National Guard, carries a traffic cone while marking off her work area during a project to build an earth-filled barrier at Bagram Airfield in Parwan province, Afghanistan, 28 Dec. 2013.

Following Hurricane Irene in 2011, a task force of vertical and horizontal Engineers from the 133rd assisted communities in Vermont in their recovery efforts.

Following Superstorm Sandy in 2012, a task force of vertical and horizontal Engineers from the 133rd assisted communities in Connecticut in their recovery efforts.

In the spring of 2013, the 133rd deployed a company of vertical engineers to El Salvador to assist in critical infrastructure repairs in support of Operation Beyond the Horizon.

In the fall of 2013, the 133rd was mobilized in Support of Operation Enduring Freedom, Afghanistan.

An article in the Portland Press Herald dated April 30, 2014 stated the 133rd Engineer Battalion is under consideration for transfer to Pennsylvania and replacement in-state by an infantry battalion. These plans were declared shelved in November 2015.

In 2022, Lt. Col. Lisa Sessions became the first woman to hold the post of commander in the Maine Army National Guard's 133rd Engineer Battalion. The change of command ceremony took place on April 3, 2022, at the Brunswick Armed Forces Reserve Center, in which Lt. Col. Shanon Cotta handed over command to Lt. Col. Lisa Sessions, marking a milestone for female leadership within the battalion.

== Honors ==
- Meritorious Unit Commendation for Operation Iraqi Freedom
- Meritorious Unit Commendation for Operation Enduring Freedom

== Notes ==
- Our Proud Military History. Maine National Guard
- 133rd Engineer Battalion. Maine National Guard
- Lineage and Honors of the 133rd Engineer Battalion
- History of the 103rd Infantry Regiment. By SSG Esther Kazian, Veterans of Foreign Wars, Norman N. Dow - Isaac E. Clewley Post 1761. Originally published in The Patriot News, The Newsletter of the Maine Military Historical Society, Volume 1, Issue 3, January 2011
- https://web.archive.org/web/20131230222819/http://103rd.newspipers.com/
- John J. Pullen (16 November 2012). The Twentieth Maine. eBookIt.com. ISBN 978-1-4566-1108-8.
- Thomas A. Desjardin (29 January 2001). Stand Firm Ye Boys from Maine: The 20th Maine and the Gettysburg Campaign. Oxford University Press. pp. 128–. ISBN 978-0-19-983091-6.
- Pearson 1913, p. 243; and personal communication, Col. Leonid Kondratiuk, Director, Historical Services, Adjutant General's Office, MA.
- John K. Mahon (1991). The War of 1812. Da Capo Press. ISBN 978-0-306-80429-8.
