= 240th Coast Artillery (United States) =

240th Coast Artillery Regiment
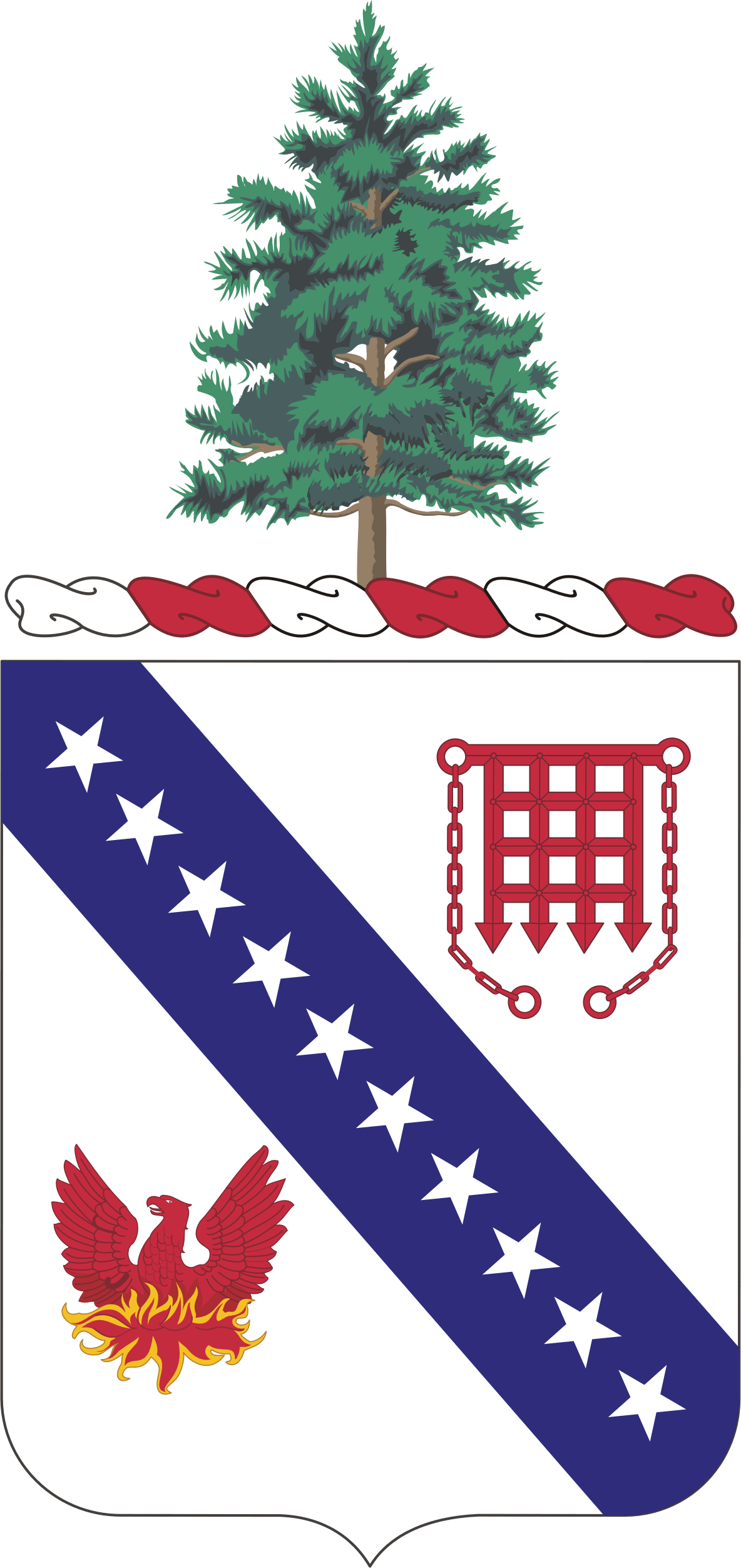
- Coat of Arms
- Active: 1924 – 1944
- Country: United States
- Branch: Army
- Type: Coast artillery
- Role: Harbor defense
- Size: Regiment
- Part of: Harbor Defenses of Portland
- Garrison/HQ: Fort McKinley; Fort Williams
- Motto(s): Semper Primus et Fidelis, "Always First and Faithful."
- Mascot(s): Oozlefinch

The 240th Coast Artillery Regiment was a Coast Artillery Corps regiment in the Maine National Guard. It garrisoned the Harbor Defenses of Portland (HD Portland), Maine 1924–1944.

== History ==
The 240th Coast Artillery was organized 16 April 1924 as the Maine National Guard component of the Harbor Defenses of Portland (HD Portland), Maine. The 8th Coast Artillery was the Regular Army component of those defenses. The 240th's primary armory was in Portland, Maine. Colonel George E. Fogg, a World War I veteran, commanded the regiment from its organization in 1924 through at least 1941. In October 1944 the regiment was broken up into two battalions as part of an Army-wide reorganization.

== Lineage ==
Organized at Portland, Maine 16 April 1924 by redesignating the 240th Artillery, Coast Artillery Corps (previously the 1st Coast Defense Command), Maine National Guard.

On 16 September 1940 the regiment was inducted into federal service at Portland, Maine and HQ moved to Fort McKinley 23 September 1940. On 2 January 1942 the HQ moved to Fort Williams.

From December 1941 to 12 February 1943 Battery F manned two towed 155 mm guns at the Biddeford Pool Military Reservation, then was relieved by Battery E of the 22nd Coast Artillery.

HHB 3rd Battalion and Battery I inactivated 18 April 1944; as new batteries were built (particularly a 16-inch gun battery at the Peaks Island Military Reservation) and older weapons scrapped manpower needs were greatly reduced.

On 5 October 1944 the regiment moved to Fort Levett; on 7 October 1944 the regiment was broken up into the 185th and 186th Coast Artillery Battalions (at Peaks Island and Jewell Island, respectively), which were deactivated 1 April 1945.

The 240th Coast Artillery's lineage traces back to the 1st Maine Volunteer Infantry Regiment, originally formed in state service in 1854 and thus older than any other Maine regimental organization. A historian of the 240th AAA (Anti-Aircraft Artillery) Group, a former Maine Army National Guard unit, has concluded that numerous subsequent Volunteer Maine Militia and Maine National Guard units (including the 240th Coast Artillery) inherited the lineage of the 1st Maine via the Portland Light Infantry company. As of 2018 this lineage is carried by the 240th Regional Training Institute, Maine Army National Guard, in Bangor.

The 240th Coast Artillery is also one of the "ancestor" units, along with the famed 20th Maine Volunteer Infantry Regiment, of the modern day 133rd Engineer Battalion of the Maine Army National Guard.

== Coat of arms ==
MOTTO: Semper Primus et Fidelis, meaning "Always First and Faithful."

Insignia on Shield: Portcullis is upper right. In ancient fortress warfare the portcullis barred the gateway to the hostile invader. Its color (red) symbolizes the artillery. The phoenix in the lower left is the crest of the City of Portland, the seaport and chief gateway of Maine. It represents the city (formerly named Falmouth) rising from its ashes after being destroyed by fire three times; by the Indians in 1676, by the French in 1690, and by the English fleet in 1775. It is also the crest of the Harbor Defenses of Portland to which the regiment was assigned for service. It further denotes the successive rebirths of the regiment following the civil, Spanish, and World wars. The ten stars running from upper left to lower right represent the ten major battles engaged in by the Regiment. The blue band serving as background for the stars signifies the intermittent existence of the regiment as infantry, especially during the Civil War.

CREST: Pine tree. Maine is the Pine Tree State.

== See also ==
- Seacoast defense in the United States
- United States Army Coast Artillery Corps
- Harbor Defense Command
