= Nathaniel J. Jackson =

Union Army general

Nathaniel James Jackson
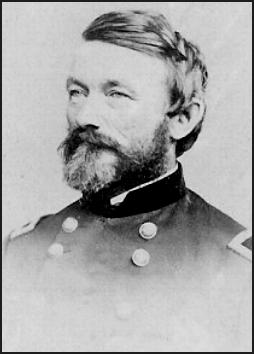
- Nathaniel James Jackson
- Born: July 28, 1818; Newburyport, Massachusetts
- Died: April 21, 1892 (aged 73); Jamestown, New York
- Burial place: Oak Hill Cemetery, Newburyport, Massachusetts
- Military career
- Allegiance: United States of America; Union
- Branch: United States Army; Union Army
- Service years: 1861–1865
- Rank: Brigadier General; Brevet Major General
- Commands: 1st Maine Infantry Regiment; 5th Maine Infantry Regiment; 1st Division, XX Corps
- Conflicts: American Civil War

Nathaniel James Jackson (July 28, 1818 – April 21, 1892) was an American machinist and soldier. He served as a general in the Union Army during the American Civil War, in which he was wounded three times. After the war, Jackson operated a mine.

== Early life and career ==
Nathaniel J. Jackson was born in the coastal town of Newburyport, Massachusetts. When he was young, he was taught "the machinist's trade" and by 1861, he was superintendent of the Hill mill in Lewiston, Maine. Jackson was also active in the Maine State Militia, and would command some of those militiamen early in the American Civil War during his first two commands.

== Civil War service ==
In 1861, Jackson chose to follow the Union cause. He was appointed commander of the 1st Maine Infantry Regiment on May 3, with the rank of colonel. The 1st Maine did not participate in the opening campaigns of the Civil War, and the 90-day regiment, as well as Jackson, were mustered out of the volunteer service in early August.

Jackson re-entered the Union Army on September 3, 1861, as colonel of the 5th Maine Infantry. This regiment enlisted for 3 years' service, and Jackson's appointment to command it was not popular. His assignment was announced on September 9, "which led to a near mutiny in the regiment. Several officers resigned and General Henry W. Slocum had to act swiftly to prevent further mutinous acts by the members of the 5th Maine." Jackson and the 5th then participated in the 1862 Peninsula Campaign. He fought during the Battle of Gaines' Mill on June 27, where Jackson was wounded in his right elbow. His regiment lost 10 killed, 69 wounded, and another 16 men missing in the battle.

Upon recovering, Jackson participated in the 1862 Maryland Campaign. He fought at the Battle of Crampton's Gap on September 14, and was present Battle of Antietam three days later. On September 19 Jackson was wounded in his knee in fighting again at Crampton's Gap. On September 23 at his camp near Williamsport, Maryland, Jackson submitted his official report concerning the battle on September 14, saying:

About 3.30 o'clock p.m... we received orders to move forward. We were formed in the first line of battle... our position being upon the left. We immediately moved forward in line to assault the enemy's lines... Arriving within about 500 yards, we became engaged with the enemy's infantry. Our line rested behind a rail fence, which position we maintained for upward of an hour, when our ammunition became completely exhausted. We then fell back a short distance... then received orders to fix bayonets and charge upon the enemy, which we did at double-quick. We remained upon the battle-field during the night. Both officers and men behaved in a noble manner. Our loss was 4 killed and 28 wounded.

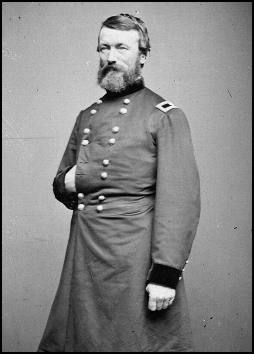
Jackson after his 1862 promotion to brigadier general

Jackson was promoted to brigadier general on September 24, 1862, and given brigade command in the XII Corps of the Army of the Potomac that October. His brigade and the XII Corps was stationed at Harper's Ferry during the Battle of Fredericksburg in December. Jackson was seriously wounded on April 17, 1863, in Spotsylvania County, Virginia, when his horse slipped and Jackson fractured his right thigh. The injury prevented him from participating in the Battle of Chancellorsville that May, and he was out of action until the fall.

When Jackson was fit enough for light duty, he was given command of the Draft Depot in New York Harbor located on Rikers Island, and then on Hart's Island, posts he held for over a year. On November 11, 1864, Jackson was ordered to the western theater and given temporary command of a division of XX Corps in the Army of Georgia. He led it during Sherman's March to the Sea in November and December 1864, in which Jackson was wounded when he was shot just above his right ankle. In 1865, he continued to lead his division in the Carolinas campaign until April 2, fighting at the Battle of Bentonville. Jackson was brevetted to the rank of major general in the Union Army on March 15, due to his conduct at the Battle of Gaines' Mill nearly three years prior.

== Postbellum ==
Jackson was mustered out of the volunteer service on August 24, 1865, and returned to civilian life. By 1870, he had left Lewiston, Maine, and also worked as a coal mine operator after the war. Jackson died in the spring of 1892 in Jamestown, New York, at the home of one of his sons. His body was returned to Massachusetts and buried there in Newburyport. It was noted that neither of the local newspapers in Jamestown nor Buffalo, the nearest major city, reported on Jackson's death.

== See also ==
- List of American Civil War generals (Union)
