= Maine Army National Guard =

Component of the US Army and military of the U.S. state of Maine

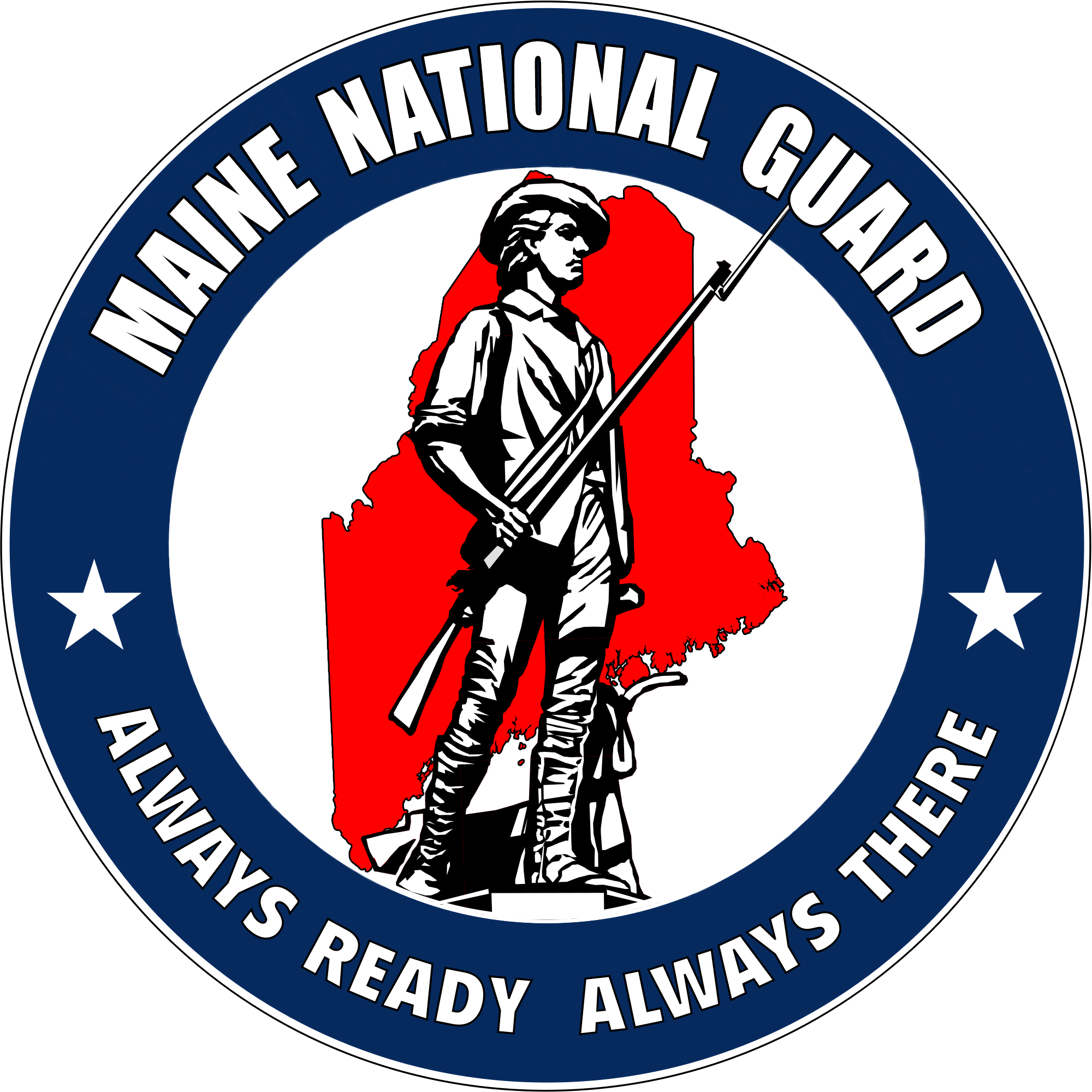
- Seal of the Maine Army National Guard
- Active: 1820–present (206 years)
- Country: United States
- Allegiance: Maine
- Branch: United States Army National Guard
- Type: ARNG Headquarters Command
- Role: Military reserve force
- Part of: Maine National Guard
- Garrison/HQ: Camp Chamberlain, Augusta, Maine
- Motto: Dirigo
- March: "The Dirigo March"

Commanders
- Civilian leadership: President Donald Trump; Commander-in-Chief; Governor Janet Mills; Governor of Maine
- Adjutant General of Maine National Guard: Maj. Gen. Diane Dunn
- Maine Army National Guard Commander: Brig. Gen. William Dionne
- Command Sergeant Major: Command Sgt. Maj. Kameel Farag

Insignia
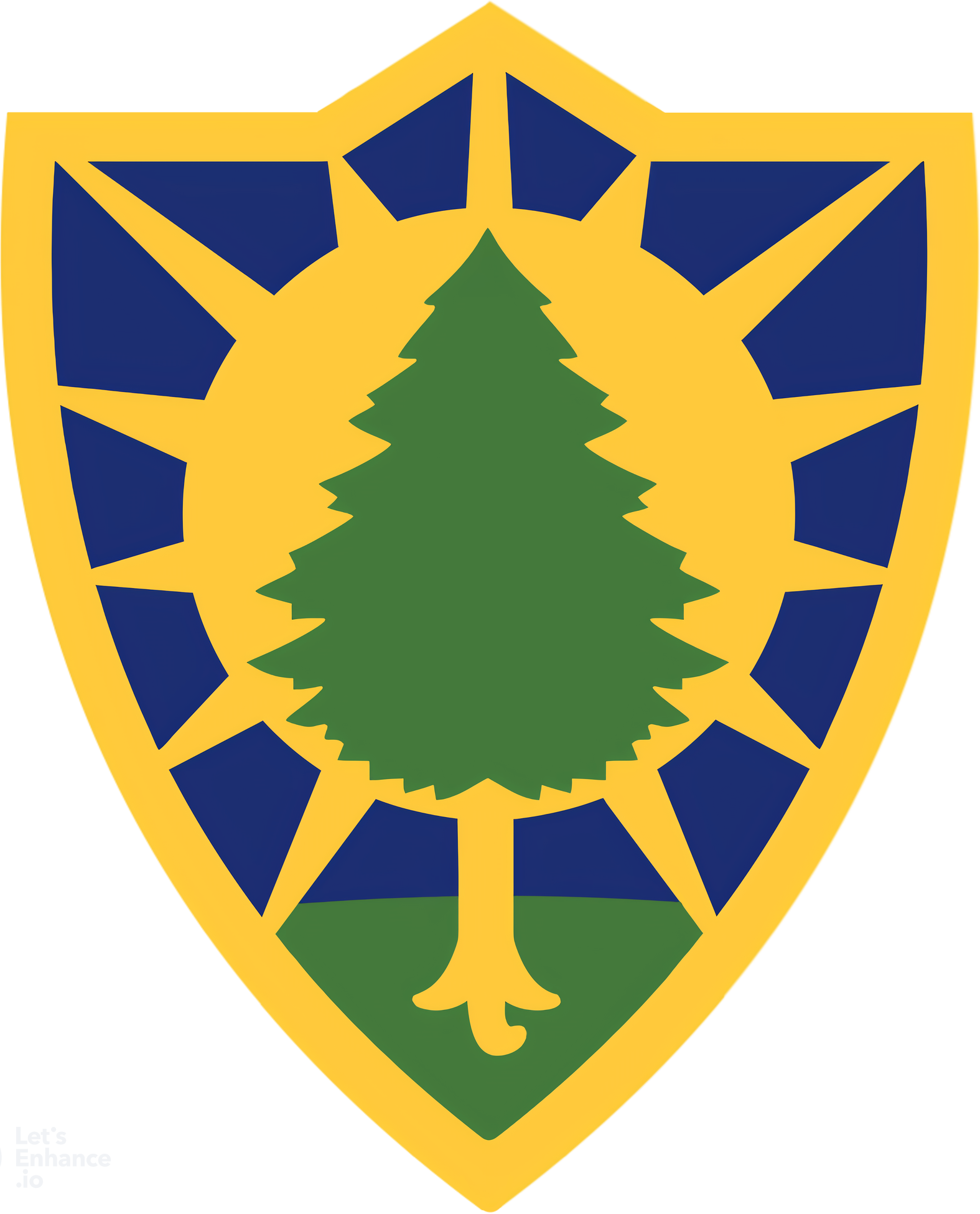
- Shoulder sleeve insignia

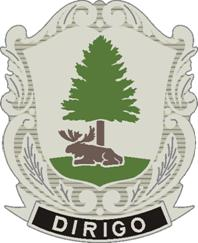
- Maine ARNG Headquarters DUI

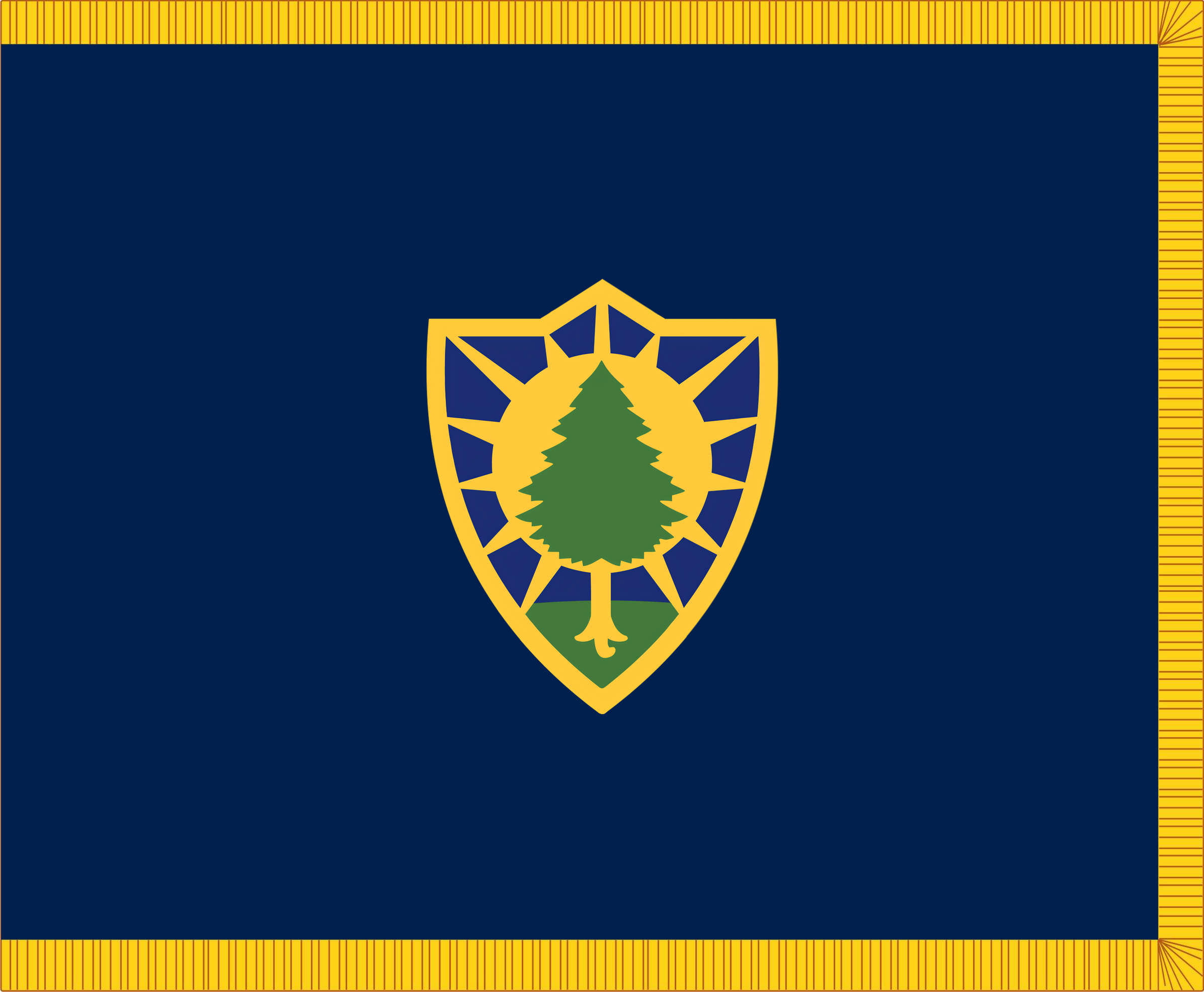
- Maine ARNG Headquarters Flag

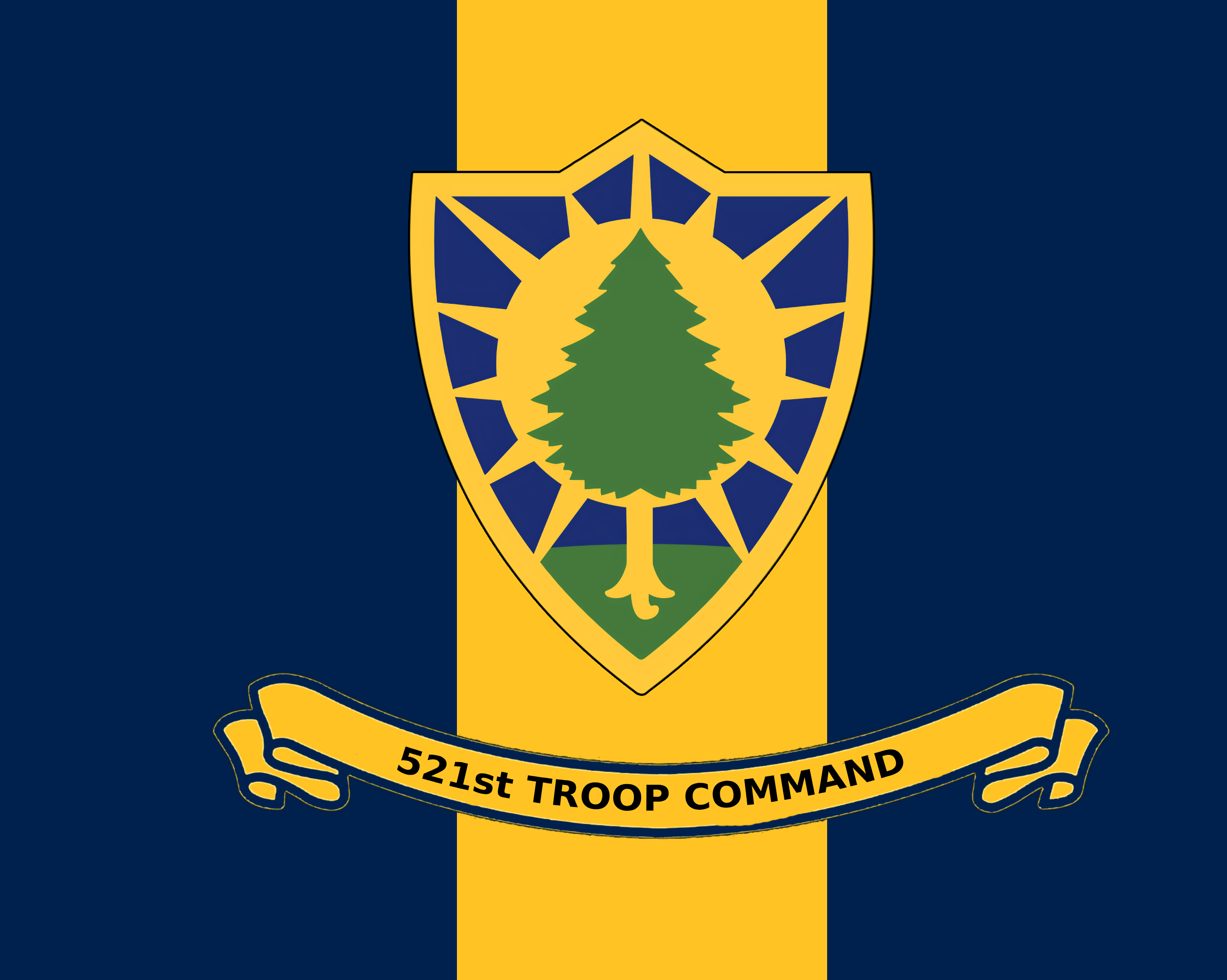
- Maine Army National Guard 521st Troop Command Flag

- Maine Army National Guard Crest

The Maine Army National Guard is a component of the United States Army and the United States National Guard. Nationwide, the Army National Guard comprises approximately one half of the US Army's available combat forces and approximately one-third of its support organization. National coordination of various state National Guard units are maintained through the National Guard Bureau. The Guard is administered by the adjutant general, an appointee of the governor of Maine. The Constitution of the United States specifically charges the National Guard with dual federal and state missions. Those functions range from limited actions during non-emergency situations to full-scale law enforcement of martial law when local law enforcement officials can no longer maintain civil control.

Maine's Army National Guard units are trained and equipped as part of the United States Army. The same ranks (enlisted/officer) and insignia are used and National Guardsmen are eligible to receive all United States military awards. The Maine Guard also bestows a number of state awards for local services rendered in or to the state of Maine.

The current adjutant general for the Maine National Guard is Major General Diane Dunn.

The Maine Army National Guard is composed of 48 units spread across approximately 29 armories and is present in 26 communities in Maine. The headquarters is located in Camp Chamberlain, Augusta, ME.

The larger units in the state specialize in:

- Combat Sustainment and Support - 286th Combat Sustainment Support Battalion
- Engineering and construction - 133rd Engineer Battalion
- Aviation - Companies of the 142d & 126th Aviation Regiments

Smaller units specialties include:

- Military police
- Transportation and maintenance
- Infantry
- Headquarters related support units
- Full List of Units

In addition, it includes the 11th WMD Civil Support Team. The 11th WMD CST was of the first of the now 57 teams that are spread across the United States of America that is tasked with immediate (less than four-hour) response to any unknown chemical, biological, or radiological incident. The joint Army/Air Guard team can self-sustain for 72 hours of continuous operation and is constantly training to stay on top of the technology and techniques for sampling, evidence collection, identification, and education of the possibilities that the team may be alerted for.

== History ==
=== Early history ===
The Maine National Guard, like Maine itself, existed before the establishment of the United States. Its roots trace back to the first colonists in the early 1600s. In 1607, Captain George Popham and over a hundred colonists established a settlement at the mouth of the Kennebec near Phippsburg. The colony built a Fort Popham for their defense but sailed back to England in 1608. Colonists would return again in 1622, when the settlements were organized into the Province of Maine.

Settlers would face frequent skirmishes with French forces from the north; however, a true militia would not form until Maine was acquired by the Massachusetts Bay Colony, with the formation of the York Company of milita in 1652, named for York County. This would be expanded to multiple companies throughout the mid-1600s, and the Maine National Guard itself considers May 31, 1671 to be its proper birthday.

They would first see true conflict in 1675 with the onset of King Phillip's War. During this war, much of the coastline was entirely depopulated. Militia companies were often called out in this conflict as raids on major towns were frequent. A force was established at Black Point (Scarborough) as the “Maine Guard,” the first such use of the term.

=== 18th and 19th centuries ===
In 1775, Maine Soldiers rushed to the Battle of Bunker Hill and the siege of Boston. Mainers would continue to serve through the end of the war.

Maine saw incursions from the British yet again during the War of 1812. British forces threatened the city of Portland in 1814, having seized Bangor and Castine earlier that year. The citizens of Southern Maine appealed to the government of Massachusetts for aid, as Maine was still part of Massachusetts. The federal government also ordered Massachusetts governor Caleb Strong to send troops to defend Maine. Governor Strong declined, as his politics differed from those of President Madison. He would leave Maine to the British.

This outraged the citizens of Maine, who rallied their own militia for their defense. The commander of the militia, General Alfond Richardson, began preparations for the defense of the town of Portland. He stated that even though he was only an officer of the militia, he was still a soldier of the United States and was bound under the Constitution to protect those under him. Forts Scammel and Preble were both manned with 200 troops and the batteries on those islands were reinforced. In addition, batteries and redoubts were built on the landward side of town to protect from an invasion overland. The Portland Light Infantry Company manned the forts in the harbor from September through October, but following the failed British assaults on New York, Maryland and Louisiana launched from Canada, major offensives effectively ended altogether and no defense of southern Maine was necessary. Formed in 1803 in Portland, the company (Forward Support Company, 133rd Engineer Battalion) is the longest serving unit in the Maine Army National Guard.

Due to the actions of Major General Richardson and the men of the Maine Division of Militia, the British decided that the fortifications around Portland were too strong and cancelled the attack. However, the implications of this event carried over into the political realm in a major way. The District of Maine, which had been dissatisfied with the government of Massachusetts since its annexation in the 1600s, now had enough with being a part of a state that would abandon it to the British. The actions of Major General Richardson propelled the push for Maine's statehood, which would occur six years later in 1820.

The Maine National Guard was officially established in 1820 as a State Militia, when Maine entered the Union (as a result of the Missouri Compromise). Forty years later, more than 72,000 Soldiers from Maine fought to preserve the Union during the Civil War (1861–65).

=== 20th century ===
For much of the final decades of the twentieth century, National Guard personnel typically served "one weekend a month, two weeks a year", with a portion working for the Guard in a full-time capacity. The current forces formation plans of the US Army call for the typical National Guard unit (or national guardsman) to serve one year of active duty for every three years of service. More specifically, current Department of Defense policy is that no guardsman will be involuntarily activated for a total of more than 24 months (cumulative) in one six-year enlistment period (this policy is due to change 1 August 2007, the new policy states that soldiers will be given 24 months between deployments of no more than 24 months, individual states have differing policies).

Since its establishment, soldiers from the Maine Army National Guard have served in every military conflict, either in a support role, or active theater operations.

According to a 2 March 2013 article in the Economist, "No state has lost more soldiers in Afghanistan, per person, than Maine—a fertile recruiting ground in every conflict since the civil war and still today home to an unusual number of veterans."

== Historic units ==
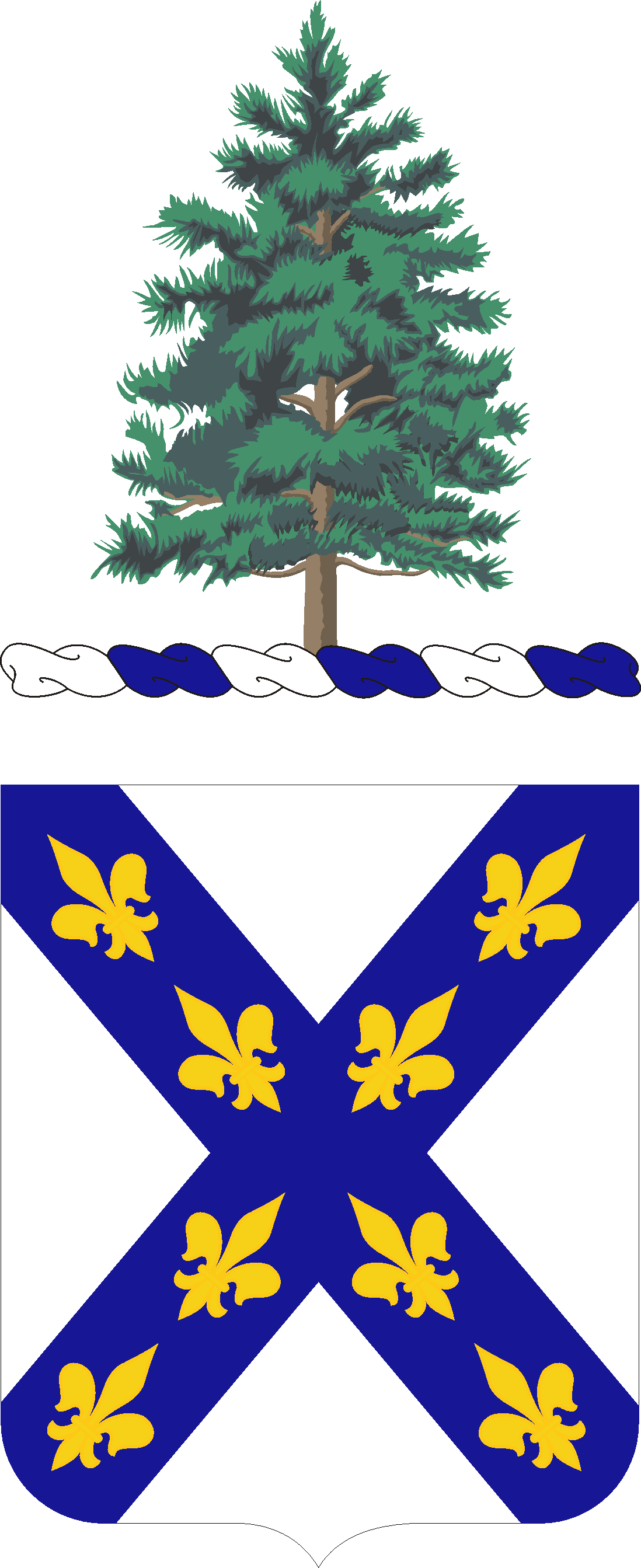
- 103rd Infantry Regiment
- 20th Maine Infantry Regiment
- Maine National Guard units in the Civil War

== Current units ==
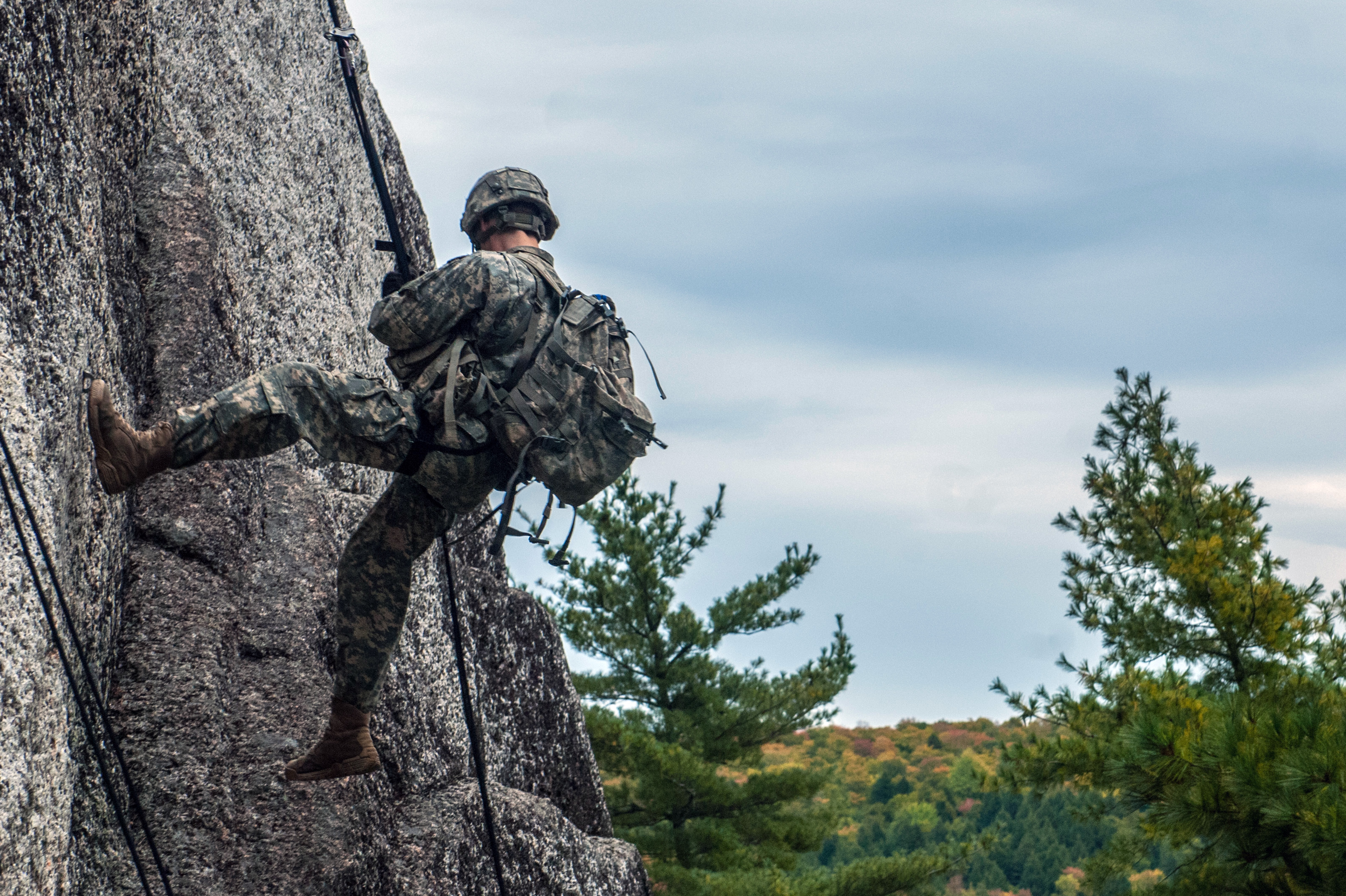
Spc. Glen Mallett of the Maine Army National Guard kicks off the wall while rappelling down the rock face at Eagles Bluff

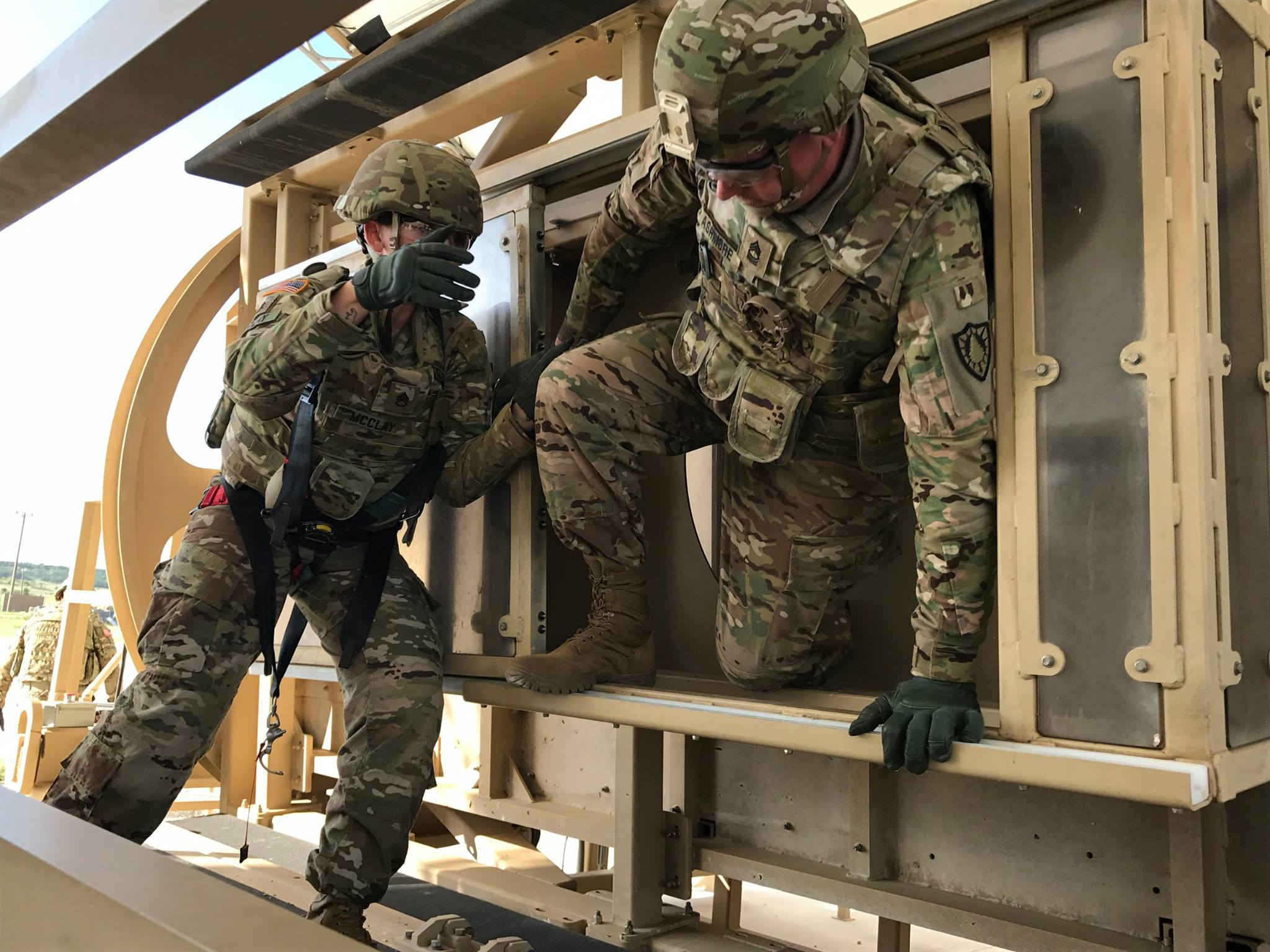
Maine Army National Guardsmen using a simulator to practice safely exiting a rolled over vehicle as part of their mobilization training

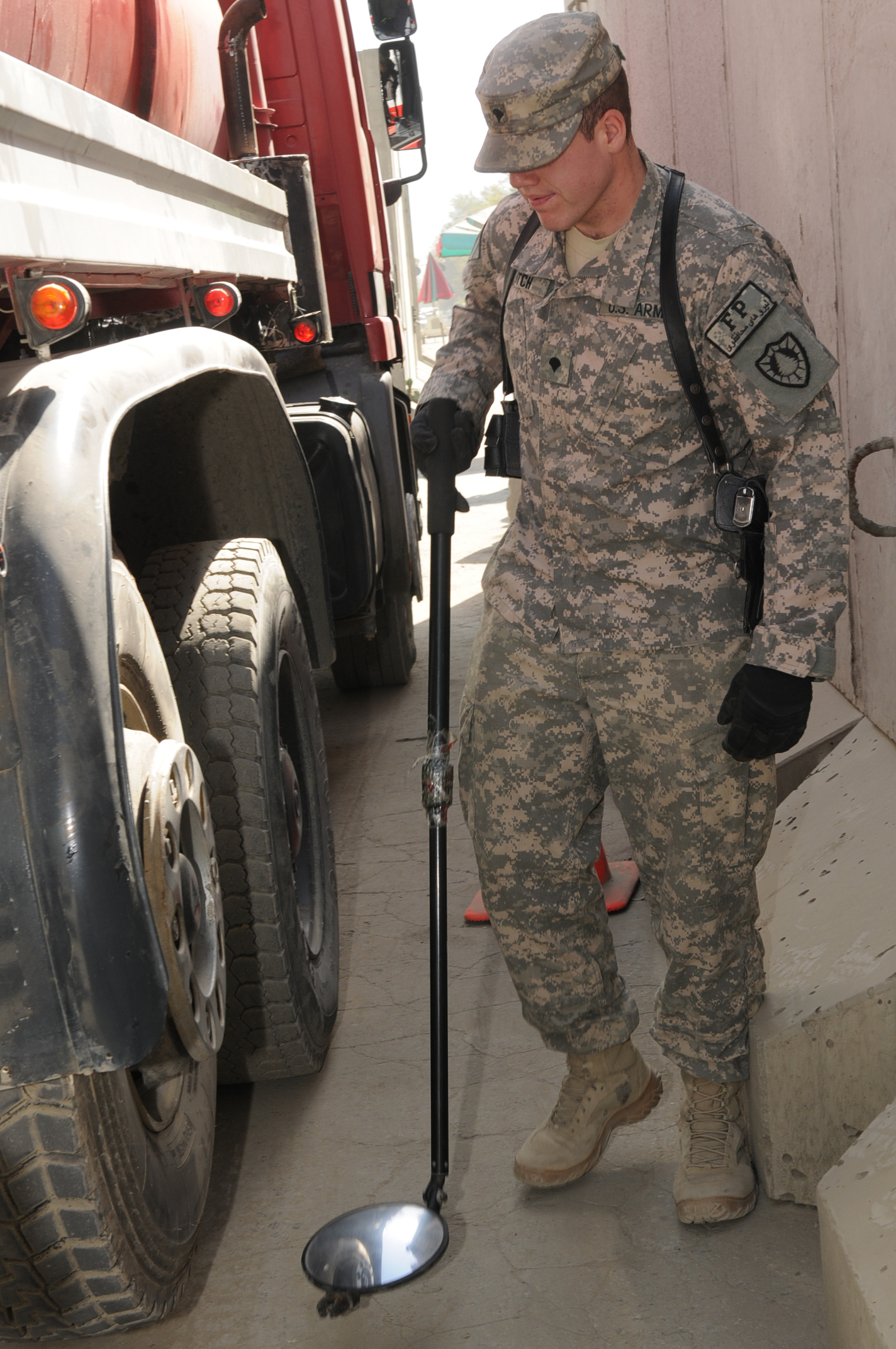
Spc. Adam Hatch of the Maine Army National Guard checks the underside of a truck for bombs, drugs or any other harmful substance at Camp Eggers in Kabul

Maine Army National Guardsmen building a school during Beyond the Horizon (BTH) 2013 in El Castano, El Salvador

U.S. Army Sgt. Anthony Sturgis, with the Maine Army National Guard's 11th Civil Support Team, rushes out from the rear of an M113 armored personnel carrier

Structure:

- Augusta
  - Joint Force Headquarters
  - Training Sites Detachment
  - 121st Public Affairs Detachment
  - Drug Demand Reduction Counter | Drug Task Force
  - Recruiting and Retention Battalion
  - Medical Readiness Unit
  - 1968th Contingency Contracting Team
  - 120th Regional Support Group
  - 152nd Support Maintenance Company
- Bangor
  - Detachment 14 - OSACOM
  - 240th Regional Training Institute
  - 52nd Troop Command
  - 521st Troop Command
  - 195th Army Band
  - 1st Battalion (Security & Support), 224th Aviation Regiment
  - 1st Battalion (General Support), 126th Aviation Regiment
    - Headquarters and Headquarters Company
      - Detachment 2
    - Company C
    - Company D
      - Detachment 2
    - Company E
      - Detachment 2
  - 3rd Battalion, 142nd Aviation Regiment
    - Headquarters and Headquarters Company
      - Detachment 2
    - Company C
      - Detachment 1
    - Company D
      - Detachment 2
    - Company E
      - Detachment 2
  - 1136th Medium Transportation Company (-)
  - 286th Combat Sustainment Support Battalion
    - Headquarters and Headquarters Company
  - 488th Military Police Company, Detachment 1
- Brewer
  - Company B, 3rd Battalion, 172nd Infantry Regiment (Mountain)
  - Headquarters & Headquarters Company (Detachment 1), 3rd Battalion, 172nd Infantry Regiment (Mountain)
  - Company E (Detachment 1), 186th Brigade Support Battalion, 86th Infantry Brigade Combat Team (Mountain) (supports 3-172nd Infantry Regiment)
- Brunswick
  - 133rd Engineer Battalion
    - Headquarters and Headquarters Company
    - Forward Support Company
- Lewiston
  - 136th Engineer Vertical Construction Company
- Norway
  - 251st Engineer Company (Sapper)
- Presque Isle
  - 185th Engineer Support Company
- Sanford
  - 262nd Engineer Construction Company
- Skowhegan
  - 136th Engineer Vertical Construction Company, Detachment 1
- Waterville
  - 11th Civil Support Team (Weapons of Mass Destruction)
- Westbrook
  - 488th Military Police Company

== See also ==
- Maine State Guard
