= 20th Maine Infantry Regiment =

- Flag of the 20th Maine
- Active: August 29, 1862 – July 16, 1865
- Country: United States
- Allegiance: Union/Federal/North
- Branch: Infantry
- Type: Regiment
- Engagements: American Civil War; Antietam; Fredericksburg; Chancellorsville; Gettysburg; Spotsylvania Court House; Petersburg; Five Forks; Appomattox

Commanders
- Notable commanders: BG. Adelbert Ames; BG. Joshua Lawrence Chamberlain; LTC. Ellis Spear

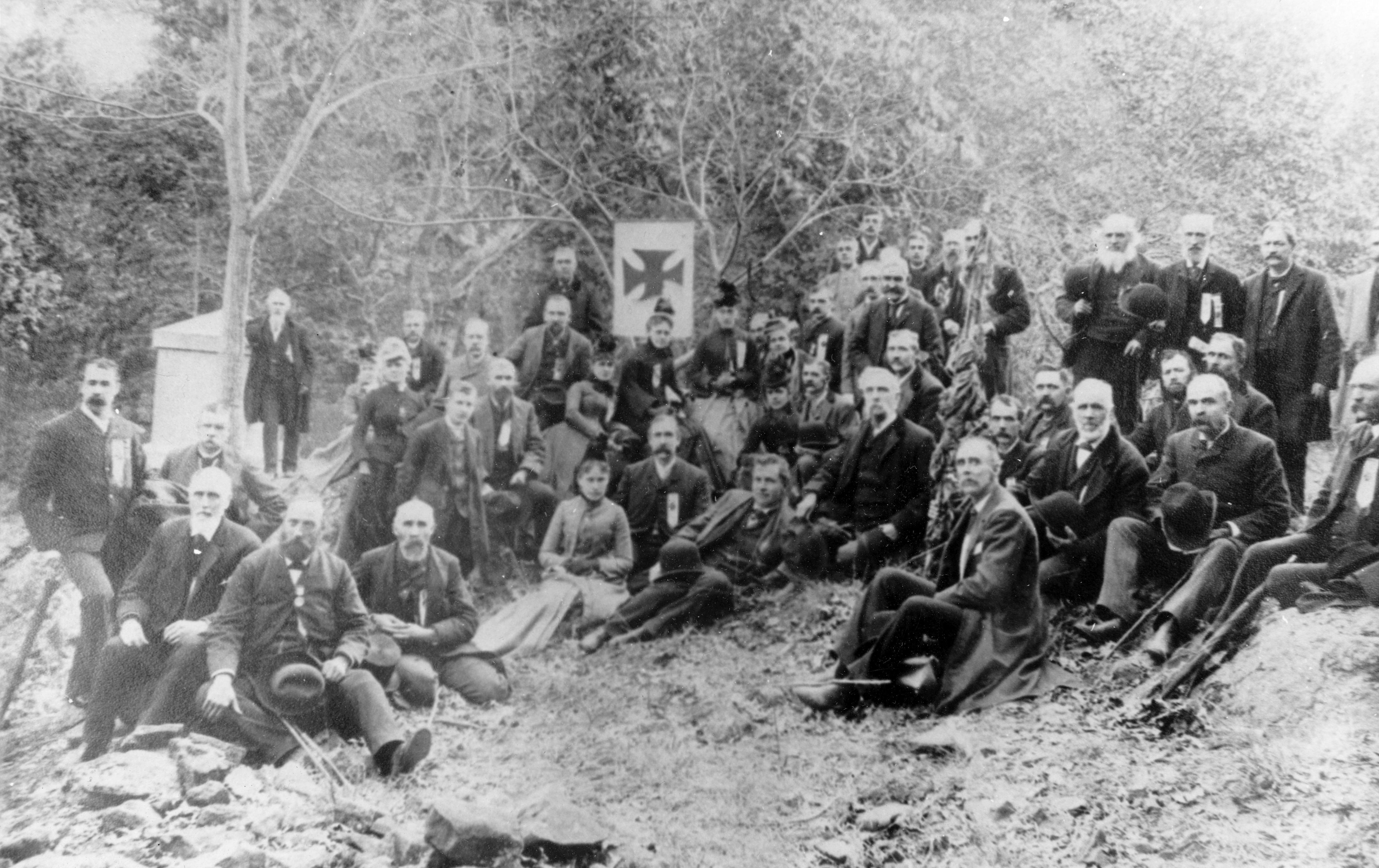
1889 reunion veterans of the 20th Maine Volunteer Infantry, at Gettysburg, Pennsylvania. General Joshua L. Chamberlain, the officer who commanded them in battle, is seated at center right, bracketed by the Maltese Cross banner of the V Corps (5th) and the unit's regimental flag. Left is a monument to the unit recently erected by its veterans.

The 20th Maine Infantry Regiment was a volunteer regiment of the United States Army (Union Army) during the American Civil War (1861–1865), most famous for its defense of Little Round Top at the Battle of Gettysburg in Gettysburg, Pennsylvania, July 1–3, 1863. The 133rd Engineer Battalion of the Maine Army National Guard and the United States Army today carries on the lineage and traditions of the 20th Maine.

== Organization ==
The 20th Maine was organized in the state of Maine and mustered into federal service on August 29, 1862, with Col. Adelbert Ames as its commander. (The regiment's undisciplined behavior while at its training camp, Camp Mason, caused Ames to exclaim, "This is a hell of a regiment!") It was assigned to the Army of the Potomac in the 3rd Brigade, 1st Division, V Corps, where it would remain until mustered out on July 16, 1865. At that time, the brigade also consisted of the 16th Michigan, the 12th, 17th, and 44th New York, 83rd Pennsylvania Volunteer Infantry regiments, and a Michigan company of sharpshooters.

== Combat history ==
Prior to their notable actions at Gettysburg in July 1863, the regiment was held in reserve at Antietam in September 1862. The regiment was also among those forced to remain overnight within sight of the Confederate lines at Fredericksburg in December 1862, forcing the regiment's Lt. Col. Joshua Chamberlain to shield himself with three dead men. The unit was unable to participate in the Battle of Chancellorsville in April–May 1863, due to a quarantine prompted by a tainted smallpox vaccine that had been issued to the unit's soldiers. On May 20, 1863, Colonel Ames was promoted and was succeeded as colonel and commander of the regiment by Lt. Col. Joshua L. Chamberlain, who had been offered and declined leadership of the unit at the time it was formed.

=== Gettysburg and Little Round Top ===
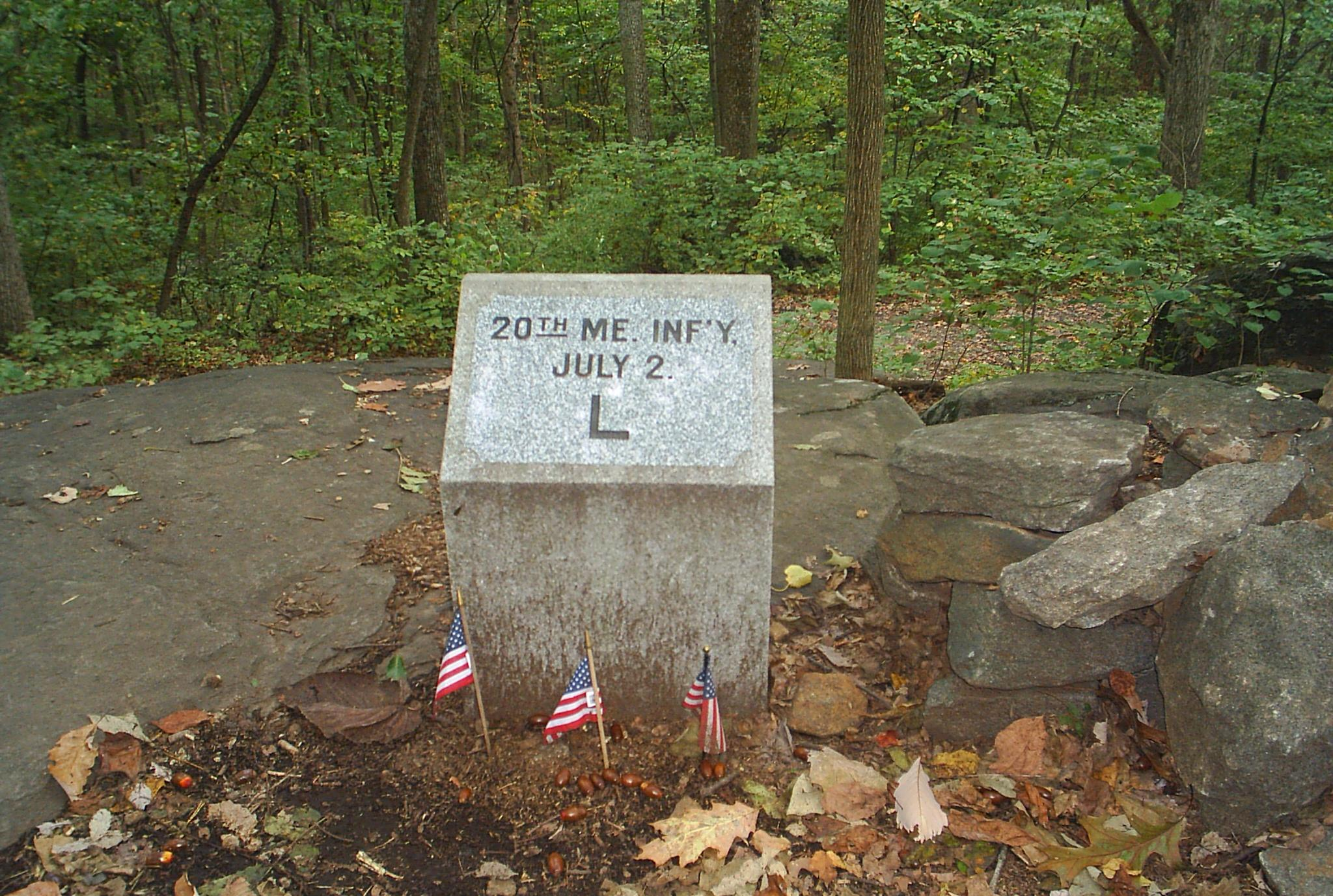
The 20th Maine's left flank marker on the Gettysburg battlefield

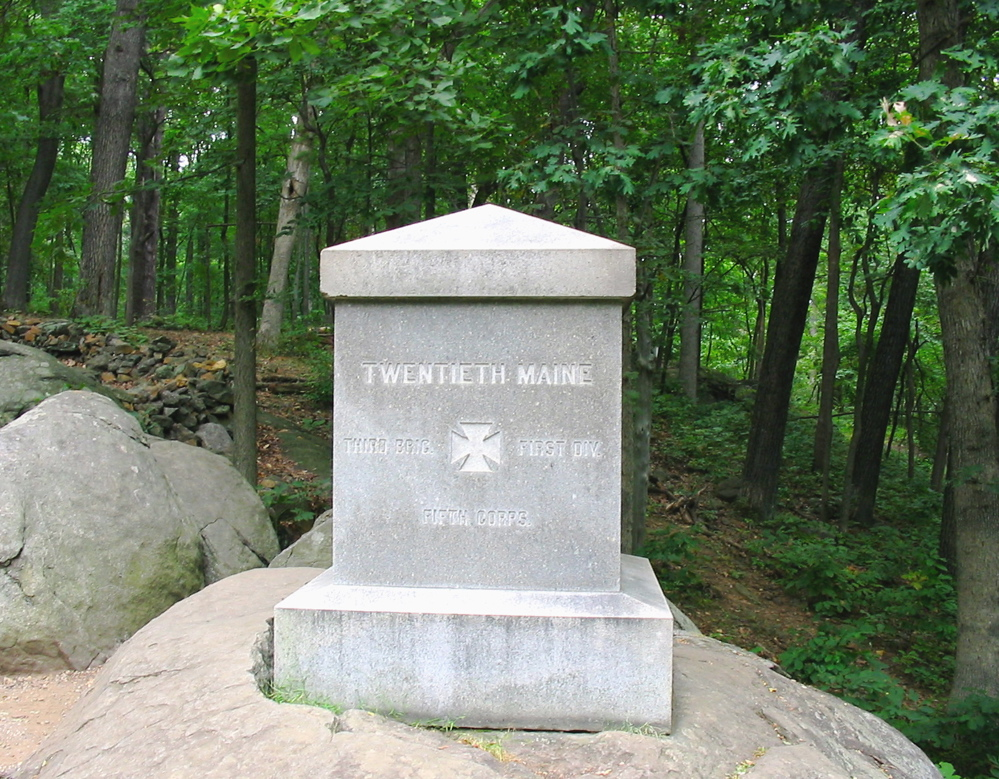
Regimental monument at the center of their lines on Little Round Top hill

The most notable battle was the regiment's decisive role on July 2, 1863, in the Battle of Gettysburg at Gettysburg, Pennsylvania, where it was stationed on Little Round Top hill at the extreme left of the Union line. When the regiment came under heavy attack from the Confederate 15th and 47th Alabama regiments (part of the division led by Maj. Gen. John Bell Hood), the 20th Maine ran low on ammunition after one and a half hours of continuous fighting; it responded to the sight of rebel infantry forming again for yet another push up the slope at them by instead suddenly charging downhill with fixed bayonets, surprising and scattering the Confederates, thus ending the attack on the hill and the attempt to flank the hill position and move around the south end of the Federal "fishhook". The 20th Maine and the adjacent 83rd Pennsylvania together captured many men from both Alabama regiments (including Lt. Col. Michael Bulger, commander of the 47th), as well as several other men of the 4th Alabama and 4th and 5th Texas regiments of the same division. Had the 20th Maine retreated from the hill, the entire Union line would have been flanked, endangering and hurting other Union regiments in the vicinity.

=== Later war ===
Later actions in which the regiment participated included Second Rappahannock Station, Mine Run, The Wilderness, Spotsylvania Court House, the Siege of Petersburg, Peebles's Farm, Lewis's Farm/Quaker Road, White Oak Road, Five Forks, and Appomattox Court House, where Brevet Maj. Gen. Joshua Chamberlain accepted the Confederate surrender there.

20th Maine Monument

=== Disbandment ===
The 20th Maine marched from Appomattox, Virginia, on May 2, reaching the national capital at Washington, D.C., on May 12, where the remaining original members were mustered out of service on June 4, 1865, with the remainder of the regiment leaving the federal service on July 16. The heritage of the 20th Maine is carried on today by the 133rd Engineer Battalion, Maine Army National Guard.

== Casualties ==
- 1,621 enrollment (soldiers assigned to the regiment)
- 147 killed or died of wounds
- 381 wounded
- 146 died of disease
- 15 in Confederate prisons

== Cultural references ==
The participation of the 20th Maine in the Battle of Fredericksburg is depicted in the 2003 feature film Gods And Generals (prequel movie to 1993's Gettysburg based on Michael Shaara's son Jeff Shaara's historical novel of the same name).

The regiment's downhill charge during the Battle of Gettysburg is depicted in the 1974 historical novels The Killer Angels by Michael Shaara (winner of the 1975 Pulitzer Prize in fiction) and Courage on Little Round Top, and was subsequently an important scene in the feature movie made 18 years later, Gettysburg in 1993.

The 2012 music video for the pop song "Some Nights" performed by Fun includes American Civil War Union soldiers serving in the regiment. The regiment is victorious in a fictional battle that portrays a young Union soldier who has left his love in Maine to serve in the regiment. During the battle, he brutally kills a Confederate soldier in hand-to-hand combat.

The 20th Maine and its color-bearer Andrew Tozier are the subjects of "Ballad of the 20th Maine", a song by the Maine band The Ghost of Paul Revere; it is the official state ballad of Maine. The song "Dixieland" by Steve Earle and the Del McCoury Band is also about the 20th Maine.

== 20th Maine in art ==
The 20th Maine has been featured in notable Civil War Paintings, such as:

- Charge of the 20th Maine - Mark Maritato
- Bayonet! Forward - Dale Gallon
- 20th Maine & 15th Alabama - Dale Gallon
- Hold at All Costs - Dale Gallon
- Near Miss – Chamberlain on Little Round Top - Dale Gallon

== See also ==
- List of Maine Civil War units
- Maine in the American Civil War
