= List of people from Cedar Rapids, Iowa =

The following is a list of notable people from Cedar Rapids, Iowa. This list includes people who were born, have lived, or worked there.

== Arts ==
- Jameil Aossey, songwriter and producer
- Douglas Barr, actor and vintner
- Michael Boddicker, musician (distant cousin of Mike Boddicker, MLB player)
- Molly Brown, actress
- Marvin D. Cone, artist
- Paul Conrad, Pulitzer Prize-winning cartoonist
- Joshua Coyne, musician
- Jim Cummins, NBC News correspondent, 1963 graduate of Regis High School
- Geof Darrow, comic book artist
- Michael Daugherty, classical composer
- Don DeFore, actor and president of National Academy of Television Arts & Sciences
- Bobby Driscoll, child actor, Treasure Island, Peter Pan
- Mark Elliot, voice-over artist for Disney previews
- Michael Emerson, actor, grew up in Toledo, Iowa
- Paul Engle, poet
- James Erwin, author
- Terry Farrell, actress
- Ed Gorman, writer
- John Hench, Disney animator and Imagineer
- Harry Hershfield, cartoonist
- Larry N. Jordan (born 1952), publisher, journalist, and author, launched weekly Cedar Rapids Press-American as a 15-year-old student
- Bert Kelly, jazz musician
- Ashton Kutcher, actor, star of films and TV's Two and a Half Men
- Ron Livingston, actor, Office Space, Band of Brothers, grew up in Marion, Iowa
- Byron McKeeby, artist
- Conger Metcalf, artist
- Dow Mossman, author
- Matthew Reinhart, author and pop-up book artist
- Megan Reinking, actor
- Ann Royer, painter, sculptor
- William L. Shirer, journalist and author
- Riley Smith, actor
- Soju, drag queen
- Carl Van Vechten, novelist and photographer
- Brooks Wheelan (born 1986), stand-up comedian, featured player on Saturday Night Live
- Elijah Wood, actor, The Lord of the Rings
- Grant Wood, painter (American Gothic)

== Business ==
- Arthur A. Collins (1909–1987), inventor and founder of Collins Radio Company
- Walter Donald Douglas, co-founder of Penick & Ford Starch Company, died on RMS Titanic
- Bob Parsons, founder of Parsons Technology and Go Daddy
- John Stuart, CEO of Quaker Oats
- Mark Walter, CEO of Guggenheim Partners, co-owner of the Los Angeles Dodgers

== Military ==
- Salvatore Giunta, US Army, first living recipient of Medal of Honor since Vietnam War
- John O. Miner, U.S. Navy rear admiral
- Paul Tibbets, pilot of B-29 Enola Gay that dropped atomic bomb on Hiroshima, Japan; lived in Cedar Rapids until 1927

== Politics ==
- Richard Lyon-Dalberg-Acton, 4th Baron Acton (1941–2010), British peer and politician
- Jeff Cooling (born 1987), member of the Iowa House of Representatives
- John Ely, member of Iowa General Assembly, instrumental in abolishing capital punishment in Iowa
- T. Cooper Evans (1924–2005), congressman
- Bourke B. Hickenlooper (1896–1971), lieutenant governor, 29th governor of Iowa, 4-term U.S. senator
- Benny Johnson, conservative political commentator and columnist
- M. W. Miles (1850–1901), postmaster of Waterville, Washington and member of the Washington House of Representatives from 1895 to 1897
- Sami Scheetz (born 1996), member of the Iowa House of Representatives
- Kara Westercamp, associate White House counsel and Judge for the United States Court of International Trade

== Science ==
- John Mark Dean (1936–2025), conservationist and marine biologist
- Alexander Lippisch (1894–1976), aerodynamics pioneer and aircraft designer
- Wright Brothers, Orville (1871–1948) and Wilbur (1867–1912), aviation pioneers, resided in Cedar Rapids in their youth

== Sports ==
- Katie Abrahamson-Henderson, head coach of the Georgia Lady Bulldogs basketball team
- Adrian Arrington (born 1985), football player
- Mike Boddicker, Major League Baseball pitcher (distant cousin of Michael Boddicker, musician)
- Robert Bruggeman, football player
- Pauly Burke, professional road cyclist
- Landon Cassill, NASCAR racer
- Ray Cheetany, UNLV football player, founder of RawTeams.com
- Ian Christianson, soccer player
- Tim DeBoom, Ironman triathlon champion
- Cal Eldred, baseball player
- Phil Estes, college football coach
- Kent Ferguson, Olympic diver, 1991 world champion
- Ben Ford, baseball player
- Joey Gase, NASCAR driver
- Trent Green, NFL quarterback
- Beulah Gundling, synchronized swimmer, aquatic artist, choreographer and author
- Fred Jackson, NFL player for Buffalo Bills
- Ashley Joens, basketball player, Phoenix Mercury
- Zach Johnson (born 1976), professional golfer, 2007 Masters champion, and the 2015 Open Championship winner
- Danielle Kahle (born 1989), figure skater
- Aaron Kampman (born 1979), football player, 2-time All-Pro
- Mitch Keller, baseball player, Pittsburgh Pirates
- Bruce Kimm, baseball player, coach, and manager
- Timothy LeDuc, figure skater
- Keegan Murray, NBA basketball player
- Kris Murray, basketball player
- George Nissen (1914–2010), three-time national AAU champion, 1935–37, developer of modern trampoline
- Wes Obermueller, baseball player
- Arthur D. Pennington, known as Art "Superman" Pennington, was a Negro league baseball star
- Lance Rozeboom, USL soccer player, Rochester Rhinos former MLS player, D.C. United
- Scott Schebler, baseball player, Los Angeles Dodgers
- Shawn Sedlacek, baseball player, Kansas City Royals
- Kiah Stokes, basketball player, Las Vegas Aces
- Ryan Sweeney, baseball player, Chicago Cubs
- Dedric Ward, football player
- Kurt Warner (born 1971), pro football quarterback, played in three Super Bowls, won Super Bowl XXXIV as Super Bowl MVP
- Earl Whitehill, Major League Baseball pitcher with the Detroit Tigers; won 218 games during his career
- Marshal Yanda, NFL offensive lineman, Baltimore Ravens, Super Bowl champion Super Bowl XLVII

== Other ==
- Alanna Arrington, fashion model
- James Henry Dolan, criminal
- Garret Frey, disability rights activist
- George Greene, Iowa Supreme Court justice
- Šárka B. Hrbková (1878–1948), Czech-American Slavologist
- Sarah Lacina, winner of CBS show Survivor: Game Changers
- Denise Stapley, winner of Survivor: Philippines
