= 5th Maine Infantry Regiment =

- Active: June 24, 1861, to July 27, 1864
- Country: United States
- Allegiance: Union
- Branch: United States Army
- Type: Infantry

Commanders
- Colonel: Mark H. Dunnell

The 5th Maine Infantry Regiment was an infantry regiment of the Union Army during the American Civil War.

== Service ==
Organized at Portland, Maine and mustered in June 24, 1861. Left State for Washington, D.C., June 26. Attached to Howard's Brigade, Heintzelman's Division, McDowell's Army of Northeastern Virginia, to August, 1861. Heintzelman's Brigade, Division of the Potomac, to October, 1862. Slocum's Brigade, Franklin's Division, Army of the Potomac, to March, 1862. 2nd Brigade, 1st Division, 1st Army Corps, Army Potomac and Dept. of the Rappahannock, to May, 1862. 2nd Brigade, 1st Division, 6th Army Corps, Army Potomac, to June, 1864.

Afterward, the regiment was combined with those of the 7th Maine Infantry to form the 1st Maine Veteran Volunteer Infantry Regiment.

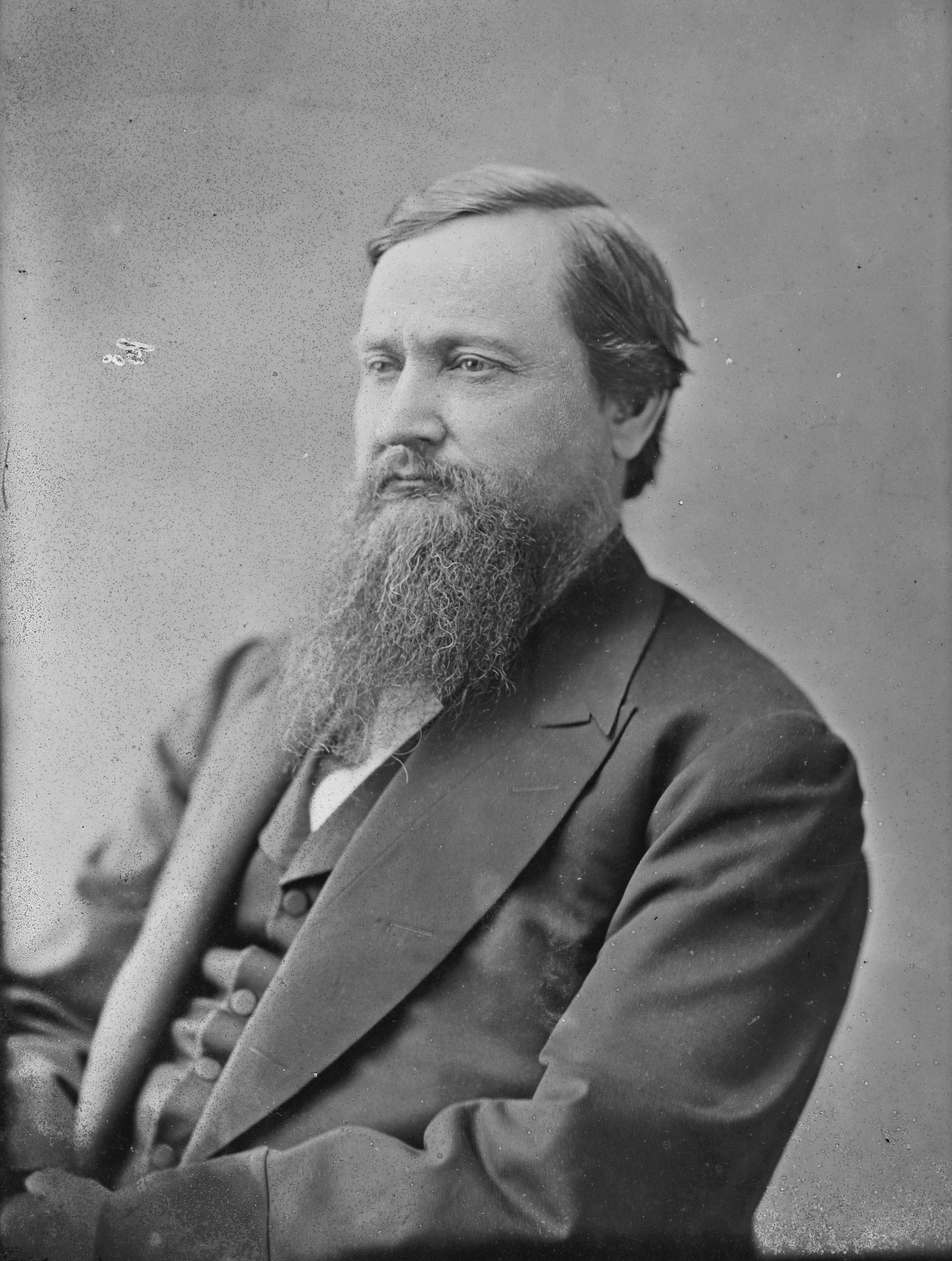
Mark Hill Dunnell, First Commander of the 5th Maine.

Today the 5th Maine's memory is preserved at the Fifth Maine Regiment Community Center on Peaks Island, Maine, formerly a reunion house for the regiment's veterans.

== Detailed History ==
This regiment was recruited from the third militia division of the state. It was mustered into the service of the United States on June 24, 1861, and numbered 1,046 men. It was made up entirely of new companies and was raised at a time when a spirit of intense patriotism prevailed throughout the state, so that little exertion was required to fill its ranks. It left Maine for Washington on June 26, fully equipped and armed with Springfield muskets and bayonets. On its way through New York City it was the recipient of a beautiful flag, presented by the loyal sons of Maine there resident. It remained in camp at Meridian Hill, Washington, until July 5, when it commenced its march to the battlefield of Bull Run. During its three years of severe service, it was engaged in eleven pitched battles and eight skirmishes, prior to its participation in the terrible campaign of the Wilderness under Grant. Its list of battles includes First Bull Run, West Point, Gaines' Mill, Charles City Cross-Roads, Crampton's Gap, Antietam, Fredericksburg, Salem Heights, Gettysburg, Rappahannock Station, Wilderness, Spottsylvania Court House and Cold Harbor. In the battle of Gaines' Mill the 5th lost 10 killed, 69 wounded and 16 missing, its gallant Col. Jackson was carried wounded from the field and Lieut.-Col. Heath was among the killed. At Rappahannock Station, the regiment was conspicuous for its gallantry, and captured 4 standards of the enemy. The flags were presented to Gen. Meade, who said: "In the name of the army and the country I thank you for the services you have rendered, particularly for the example you have set and which I doubt not on future occasions will be followed and emulated." In a gallant charge on the enemy's works at Spotsylvania Court House, more than half of the regiment was lost in crossing an open field subject to a raking fire of canister, but it captured the works, and took 2 flags and a large number of prisoners. In addition to the 6 captured flags, the 5th had the record of taking more men prisoners than it carried on its own rolls. It left the front near Petersburg, June 22, 1864, and started for home, arriving in Portland on the 28th with 216 men, who were mustered out of service, July 27, 1864, the veterans and recruits having been transferred to the 7th Me. During its term of service it had received some 500 recruits.

== Engagements ==
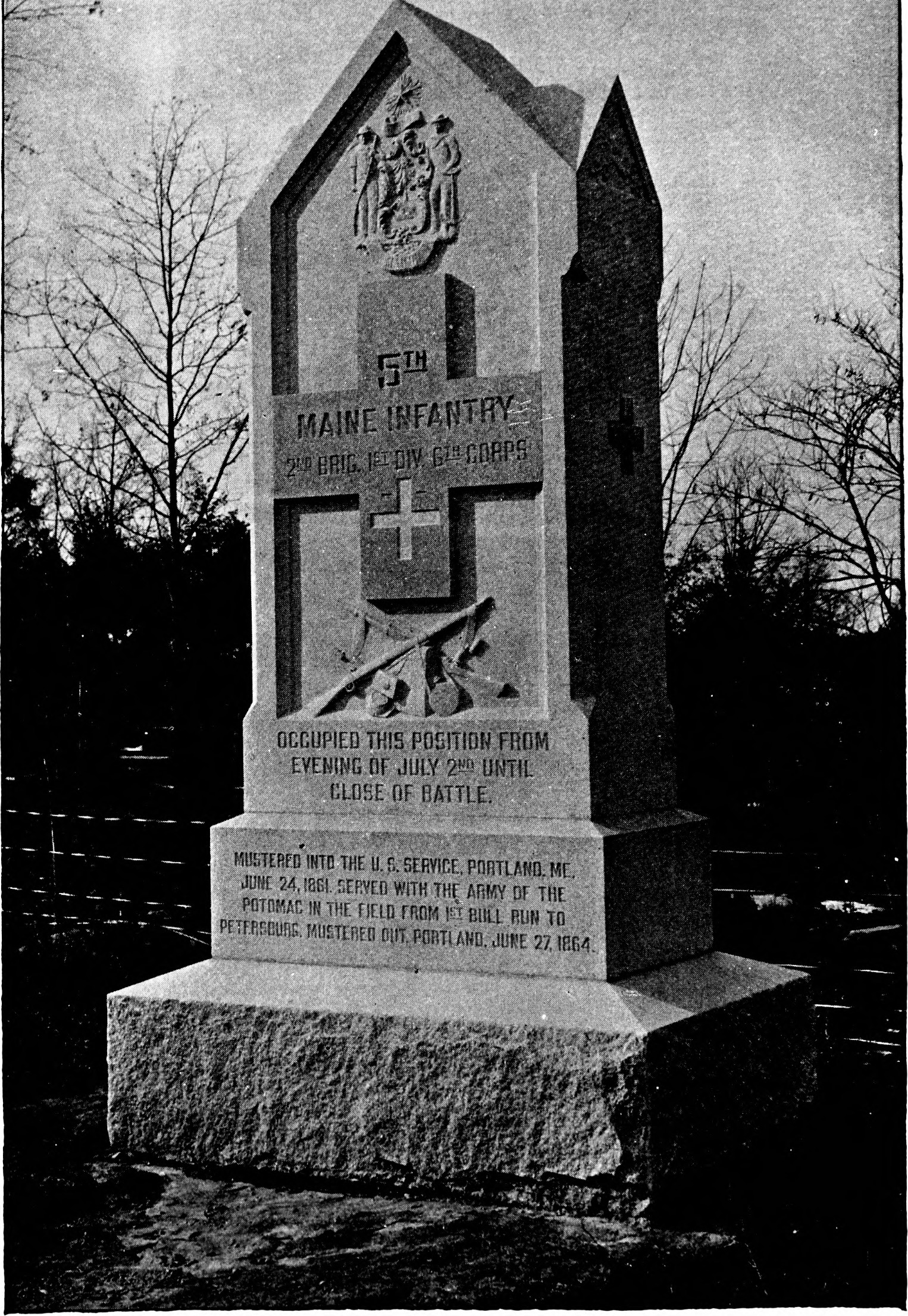
The Fifth Maine memorial at Gettysburg

- First Bull Run
- Peninsular Campaign
  - West Point
  - Gaines Mill
  - Goldings Farm
  - Malvern Hill
- Crampton's Gap (Antietam Campaign)
- Antietam
- Fredericksburg
- Chancellorsville
- Gettysburg
- Funkstown, MD
- Rappahannock Station (Bristoe Campaign)
- Locust Grove (Mine Run Campaign)
- Wilderness
- Spotsylvania
- North Anna
- Cold Harbor
- Petersburg

== Detailed service ==
Organized at Portland, Maine and mustered in June 24, 1861. Left State for Washington, D.C., June 26. Attached to Howard's Brigade, Heintzelman's Division, McDowell's Army of Northeastern Virginia, to August, 1861. Heintzelman's Brigade, Division of the Potomac, to October, 1862. Slocum's Brigade, Franklin's Division, Army of the Potomac, to March, 1862. 2nd Brigade, 1st Division, 1st Army Corps, Army Potomac and Dept. of the Rappahannock, to May, 1862. 2nd Brigade, 1st Division, 6th Army Corps, Army Potomac, to June, 1864.

SERVICE.--Camp at Meridian Hill, Washington, D.C. until July 16, 1861. Advance on Manassas, Va., July 16–21. Battle of Bull Run July 21. Duty in the Defenses of Washington until March, 1862. Expedition to Pohick Church, Va., October 3, 1861. Advance on Manassas, Va., March 10–15, 1862. McDowell's advance on Fredericksburg, Va., April 4–12. Ordered to the Peninsula April 22. Siege of Yorktown (on Transports) April 24-May 4. West Point May 7–8. Seven days before Richmond June 25-July 1. Gaines' Mill June 27. Golding's Farm June 28. Savage Station June 29. Charles City Cross Roads and Glendale June 30. Malvern Hill July 1. At Harrison's Landing until August 15. Retreat from the Peninsula and movement to Centreville August 15–27. In works at Centreville August 27–31. Assist in checking Pope's rout at Bull Run and cover retreat to Fairfax C. H., September 1. Maryland Campaign September–October. Crampton's Pass, South Mountain, September 14. Battle of Antietam September 16–17. At Hagerstown, Md., September 26 to October 29. Movement to Falmouth, Va., October 29-November 19. Battle of Fredericksburg December 12–15. "Mud March" January 20–24, 1863. Chancellorsville Campaign April 27-May 6. Operations at Franklin's Crossing April 29-May 2. Maryes Heights, Fredericksburg, May 3. Salem Heights May 3–4. Banks' Ford May 4. Operations about Deep Run Ravine June 6–13. Battle of Gettysburg, Pa., July 2–4. Near Funkstown, Md., July 10–13. Hagerstown July 13. Bristoe Campaign October 9–22. Advance to line of the Rappahannock November 7–8. Rappahannock Station November 7. Mine Run Campaign November 26-December 2. Campaign from the Rapidan to the James River May 3 to June 15. Battles of the Wilderness May 5–7; Laurel Hill May 8; Spotsylvania May 8–12; Spotsylvania C. H. May 12–21. "Bloody Angle," assault on the Salient, May 12. North Anna River May 23–26. On line of the Pamunkey May 26–28. Totopotomoy May 28–31. Cold Harbor June 1–12. Before Petersburg June 19–22. Ordered to the rear for muster out. Mustered out July 27, 1864, expiration of term. Veterans and Recruits transferred to 6th Maine Infantry.

== Casualties ==
107 men were killed in action or died of wounds, while another 77 died of disease. Another reference only has 137 men dying or being killed in battle (though same volume, in appendix, also claims 143 for casualty count).

== Commanders ==
- Mark H. Dunnell
- Nathaniel J. Jackson
- Edward Scamman
- Clark S. Edwards

== See also ==
- List of Maine Civil War units
- Maine in the American Civil War
