= Deephaven, Minnesota =

City in Minnesota, United States

- City
- Logo
- Motto: "Two Square Miles of Tranquility"
- Location of Deephaven within Hennepin County, Minnesota
- Coordinates: 44.925681°N 93.5408122°W
- Country: United States
- State: Minnesota
- County: Hennepin
- Incorporated: 1900

Government
  - Mayor: Kent M. Carlson

Area
  - Total: 3.90 sq mi (10.11 km^{2})
  - Land: 2.32 sq mi (6.02 km^{2})
  - Water: 1.58 sq mi (4.09 km^{2})
- Elevation: 955 ft (291 m)

Population (2020)
  - Total: 3,899
  - Density: 1,676.9/sq mi (647.45/km^{2})
- Time zone: UTC-6 (Central (CST))
  - Summer (DST): UTC-5 (CDT)
- ZIP Codes: 55331, 55391
- Area code: 952
- FIPS code: 27-15148
- GNIS feature ID: 0642705
- Website: www.cityofdeephaven.org

Deephaven is a city in Hennepin County, Minnesota, United States. The population was 3,899 as of the 2020 census. Situated roughly 13 miles (21 km) west of Minneapolis, it is a western suburb of the Twin Cities.

Deephaven, located along the eastern shore of Lake Minnetonka, is the birthplace of the lake racing scow sailboat. In addition, The Cottagewood General Store is a local landmark that has been serving tourists and locals since 1895.

== History ==
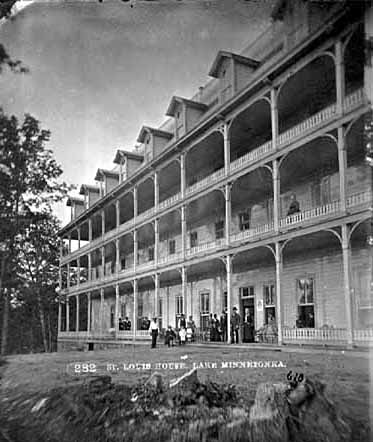
Hotel Saint Louis circa 1885

Deephaven was settled in 1876 by Saint Louis attorney Charles Gibson. Gibson built a summer house in an area known as "Northome" and began promoting the area as a vacation destination for Southerners. In 1879 he advocated for the construction of the 150-room Hotel Saint Louis, the area's first grand hotel. The community was connected to the Minneapolis and Saint Louis Railway to serve both the hotel and local cottagers.

The Minnetonka Yacht Club was founded in Deephaven in 1882 and incorporated in 1889. One of its co-founders, Hazen Burton, built a home named "Chimo" in Deephaven in 1890. A train depot was built near the property so that the Burtons could commute to their department store in Minneapolis. The name "Deephaven" can be traced back to this depot's name.

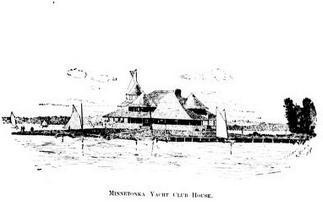
Minnetonka Yacht Club circa 1894

In 1893 Burton commissioned local boat builder Arthur Dyer to develop a new kind of sailboat called a racing scow. When the Onawa debuted in 1893, it was disqualified for winning nearly every regatta it entered. The rules were eventually modified, and racing scows became popular worldwide. The Onawa is displayed at the Excelsior-Lake Minnetonka Historical Society Museum in nearby Excelsior.

Lake Minnetonka fell out of favor as a vacation destination in the 1890s. The Hotel Saint Louis suffered financially and was demolished in 1907. In its place, Walter Donald Douglas of the Quaker Oats fortune and his wife Mahala built a 27-room estate named "Walden". Douglas died in the Titanic disaster in 1912, but Mahala and her French maid Berthe Leroy survived. Mahala returned to Deephaven as a widow and lived there until her death in 1945.

Deephaven's Cottagewood General Store, opened in 1895 by Ralph M. Chapman, served as a grocer to tourists along Lake Minnetonka. The store is one of Deephaven's most notable attractions.

== Geography ==
According to the United States Census Bureau, the city has an area of 2.43 square miles (6.29 km^{2}), of which 2.37 square miles (6.14 km^{2}) is land and 0.06 square miles (0.16 km^{2}) is water. Minnetonka Boulevard serves as a main route.

== Demographics ==
Historical population
| Census | Pop. | Note | %± |
|---|---|---|---|
| 1910 | 234 | | — |
| 1920 | 238 | | 1.7% |
| 1930 | 530 | | 122.7% |
| 1940 | 1,026 | | 93.6% |
| 1950 | 1,823 | | 77.7% |
| 1960 | 3,286 | | 80.3% |
| 1970 | 3,853 | | 17.3% |
| 1980 | 3,716 | | −3.6% |
| 1990 | 3,653 | | −1.7% |
| 2000 | 3,853 | | 5.5% |
| 2010 | 3,642 | | −5.5% |
| 2020 | 3,899 | | 7.1% |
U.S. Decennial Census

=== 2020 census ===
As of the 2020 census, Deephaven had a population of 3,899. The median age was 45.6 years. 27.3% of residents were under the age of 18 and 18.7% of residents were 65 years of age or older. For every 100 females there were 97.8 males, and for every 100 females age 18 and over there were 96.5 males age 18 and over.

100.0% of residents lived in urban areas, while 0.0% lived in rural areas.

There were 1,403 households in Deephaven, of which 38.0% had children under the age of 18 living in them. Of all households, 70.0% were married-couple households, 10.5% were households with a male householder and no spouse or partner present, and 16.7% were households with a female householder and no spouse or partner present. About 19.0% of all households were made up of individuals and 12.3% had someone living alone who was 65 years of age or older.

There were 1,514 housing units, of which 7.3% were vacant. The homeowner vacancy rate was 1.5% and the rental vacancy rate was 7.5%.

Racial composition as of the 2020 census
| Race | Number | Percent |
|---|---|---|
| White | 3,635 | 93.2% |
| Black or African American | 10 | 0.3% |
| American Indian and Alaska Native | 2 | 0.1% |
| Asian | 51 | 1.3% |
| Native Hawaiian and Other Pacific Islander | 0 | 0.0% |
| Some other race | 39 | 1.0% |
| Two or more races | 162 | 4.2% |
| Hispanic or Latino (of any race) | 88 | 2.3% |

=== 2010 census ===
As of the census of 2010, there were 3,642 people, 1,337 households, and 1,058 families living in the city. The population density was 1,536.7 inhabitants per square mile (593.3/km^{2}). There were 1,423 housing units at an average density of 600.4 per square mile (231.8/km^{2}). The racial makeup of the city was 97.6% White, 0.4% African American, 0.1% Native American, 0.9% Asian, 0.3% from other races, and 0.7% from two or more races. Hispanic or Latino of any race were 1.1% of the population.

There were 1,337 households, of which 38.8% had children under the age of 18 living with them, 71.3% were married couples living together, 5.5% had a female householder with no husband present, 2.4% had a male householder with no wife present, and 20.9% were non-families. 17.4% of all households were made up of individuals, and 7.4% had someone living alone who was 65 years of age or older. The average household size was 2.71 and the average family size was 3.08.

The median age in the city was 46.1 years. 27.5% of residents were under the age of 18; 4.7% were between the ages of 18 and 24; 16.2% were from 25 to 44; 37.5% were from 45 to 64; and 14.3% were 65 years of age or older. The gender makeup of the city was 49.7% male and 50.3% female.

=== 2000 census ===
As of the census of 2000, there were 3,853 people, 1,373 households, and 1,098 families living in the city. The population density was 1,646.4 inhabitants per square mile (635.7/km^{2}). There were 1,409 housing units at an average density of 602.1 per square mile (232.5/km^{2}). The racial makeup of the city was 97.35% White, 0.29% African American, 0.34% Native American, 0.70% Asian, 0.05% Pacific Islander, 0.29% from other races, and 0.99% from two or more races. Hispanic or Latino of any race were 0.91% of the population.

There were 1,373 households, out of which 42.4% had children under the age of 18 living with them, 71.7% were married couples living together, 5.9% had a female householder with no husband present, and 20.0% were non-families. 16.6% of all households were made up of individuals, and 6.3% had someone living alone who was 65 years of age or older. The average household size was 2.79 and the average family size was 3.16.

In the city, the population was spread out, with 30.5% under the age of 18, 3.7% from 18 to 24, 25.2% from 25 to 44, 29.8% from 45 to 64, and 10.8% who were 65 years of age or older. The median age was 40 years. For every 100 females, there were 97.6 males. For every 100 females age 18 and over, there were 94.4 males.

The median income for a household in the city was $101,278, and the median income for a family was $107,422. Males had a median income of $71,181 versus $42,297 for females. The per capita income for the city was $58,544. About 1.0% of families and 2.6% of the population were below the poverty line, including 2.8% of those under age 18 and 3.8% of those age 65 or over.

== Politics ==
Presidential election results

Precinct General Election Results
| Year | Republican | Democratic | Third parties |
|---|---|---|---|
| 2024 | 39.4% 1,076 | 57.9% 1,581 | 2.6% 72 |
| 2020 | 39.5% 1,070 | 58.3% 1,591 | 2.2% 61 |
| 2016 | 39.6% 1,001 | 50.9% 1,286 | 9.5% 242 |
| 2012 | 54.2% 1,383 | 44.5% 1,137 | 1.3% 34 |
| 2008 | 48.6% 1,215 | 50.5% 1,261 | 0.9% 22 |
| 2004 | 55.9% 1,414 | 43.1% 1,090 | 1.0% 26 |
| 2000 | 57.3% 1,357 | 37.0% 878 | 5.7% 135 |
| 1996 | 52.4% 1,170 | 38.9% 868 | 8.7% 194 |
| 1992 | 44.6% 1,086 | 32.2% 784 | 23.2% 565 |
| 1988 | 67.0% 1,562 | 33.0% 770 | 0.0% 0 |
| 1984 | 68.1% 1,517 | 31.9% 710 | 0.0% 0 |
| 1980 | 60.9% 1.344 | 25.2% 557 | 13.9% 307 |
| 1976 | 67.2% 1,488 | 30.0% 665 | 2.8% 62 |
| 1972 | 67.6% 1,313 | 30.4% 590 | 2.0% 39 |
| 1968 | 65.0% 1,172 | 32.6% 587 | 2.4% 44 |
| 1964 | 63.8% 1,119 | 36.1% 635 | 0.1% 1 |
| 1960 | 74.3% 1,206 | 25.7% 418 | 0.0% 0 |
| 1956 | 75.8% 988 | 24.2% 315 | 0.0% 0 |

== Notable people ==
- Michael Ankeny, alpine ski racer
- Beej Chaney, musician
- Marisa Coughlan, actress
- Walter Donald Douglas, Titanic disaster victim
- Jake Gardiner, Toronto Maple Leafs defenceman
- Jeffrey Hatcher, playwright and screenwriter
- Tim Herron, professional golfer
- Max McGee, Green Bay Packers football player
- Kelly Morrison, U.S. Representative starting in 2025
- Dean Phillips, U.S. Representative, resident from 2011 until 2021
- Mike Plant, yachtsman
