= George Littlefield =

George Littlefield may refer to:

- George H. Littlefield (1842–1919), US Medal of Honor winner
- George W. Littlefield (1842–1920), Regent of the University of Texas
