= 6th Maine Infantry Regiment =

- Active: July 15, 1861, to August 15, 1864
- Country: United States
- Allegiance: Union
- Branch: Infantry
- Engagements: Siege of Yorktown; Battle of Williamsburg; Seven Days Battles; Battle of Gaines' Mill; Battle of Garnett's & Golding's Farm; Battle of Savage's Station; Battle of White Oak Swamp; Battle of Malvern Hill; Battle of South Mountain; Battle of Antietam; Battle of Fredericksburg; Battle of Gettysburg; Bristoe Campaign; Second Battle of Rappahannock Station; Mine Run Campaign; Battle of the Wilderness; Battle of Spotsylvania Court House

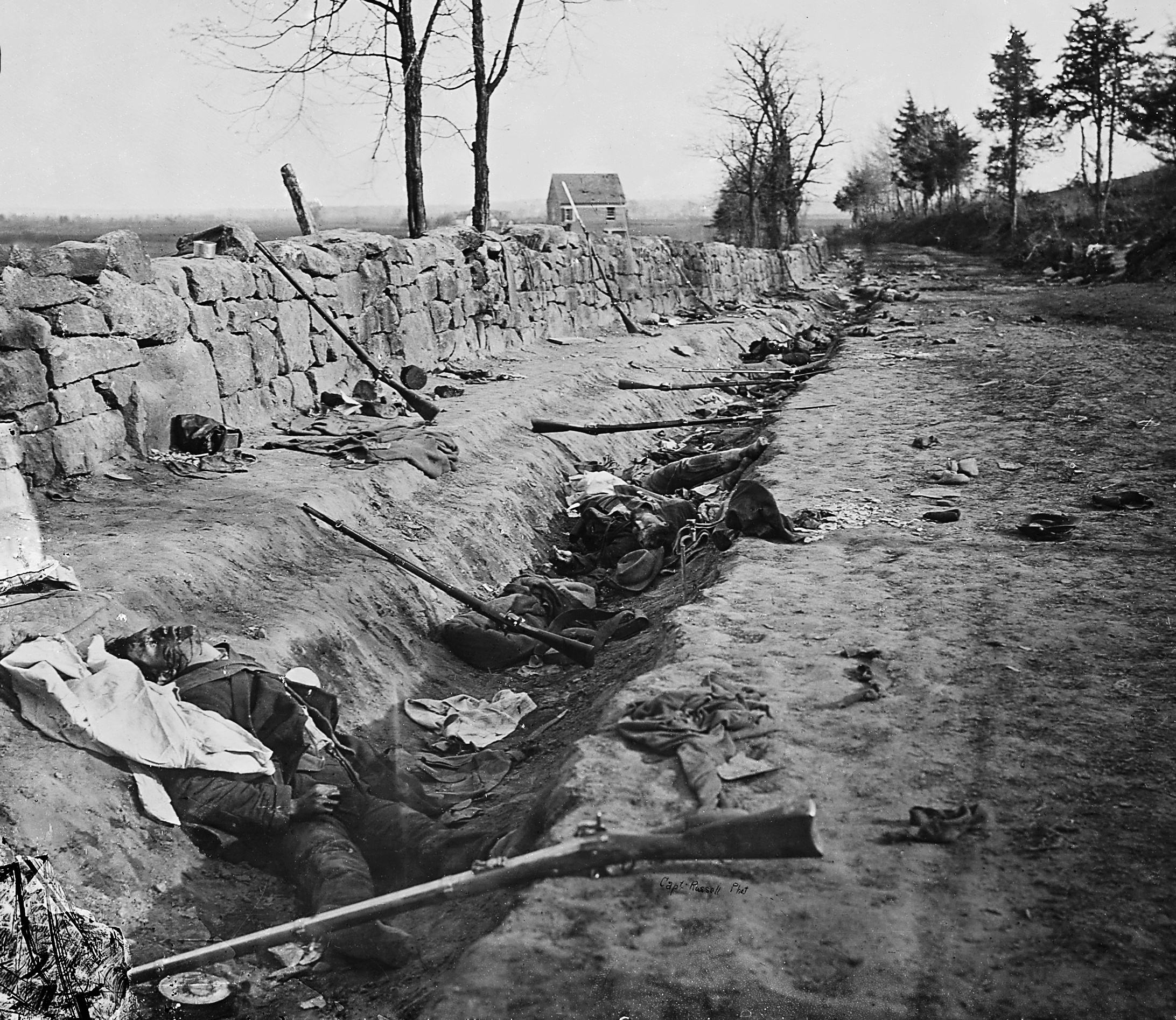
Marye's Heights, Fredericksburg, Virginia, after overrun by the 6th Maine, 3 May 1863

The 6th Maine Infantry Regiment was an infantry regiment that served in the Union Army during the American Civil War.

== Service ==
The 6th Maine Infantry was organized in Portland, Maine and mustered in for a three-year enlistment on July 15, 1861.

The regiment was attached to W. F. Smith's Brigade, Division of the Potomac, to October 1861. 2nd Brigade, Smith's Division, Army of the Potomac, to March 1862. 1st Brigade, 2nd Division, IV Corps, Army of the Potomac, to May 1862. 1st Brigade, 2nd Division, VI Corps, to February 1863. Light Division, VI Corps, to May 1863. 3rd Brigade, 1st Division, VI Corps, to August 1864.

The 6th Maine Infantry mustered out of service August 15, 1864. Veterans and recruits were transferred to the 7th Maine Infantry and soon consolidated to become the 1st Maine Veteran Infantry.

== Detailed History ==
This regiment was composed principally of the hardy lumbermen of the Penobscot Valley and the eastern portion of the state, who were quick to respond to the first call to arms. Before its organization it was made up of two battalions of five companies each, rendezvousing respectively at the state arsenal, Bangor, and Fort Sullivan, Eastport. Under a general order from Adjt.-Gen. Hodsdon, June 28, 1861, both battalions were removed to Portland and organized into a regiment for active service. On July 12–15, 1861, it was mustered into the service of the United States and on the 17th left for Washington. En route through New York City, the regiment was presented with a handsome standard by the sons of Maine in that city. It arrived in Washington on the 19th and was stationed at Chain Bridge on the Potomac, where it remained until Sept. 3. Through the fall and winter of 1861-62 it occupied Fort Griffin, and in March, 1862, was put into Hancock's brigade, Smith's division, and joined in the advance on Manassas. A little later it was attached to the 4th Corps under Gen. E. D. Keyes, and advanced with the rest of the army on Yorktown on April 4, 1862. For the remainder of its three years the regiment saw the most arduous and active service. It participated in ten general engagements and in a great many skirmishes. On April 5–7, 1862, it was engaged in skirmishing and reconnaissances at the siege of Yorktown, and subsequently took part in the engagements at Lee's Mills, Williamsburg, Garnett's Farm, White Oak bridge, Antietam and Fredericksburg. From Feb. 2 to May 11, 1863, it was with the "Light Division", and during this period took an honorable part in the Battle of Chancellorsville, where it lost 128 officers and men killed and wounded. Other important battles in which the 6th was engaged were Rappahannock Station, where it lost 16 officers and 123 men; Wilderness, Spottsylvania Court House, where it lost a few men, and two days later in an attack on the enemy's works on the right, it lost 125 in killed, wounded and missing. On June 12, 1864, the regiment only numbered 70 men, and was under fire for eight hours, supporting Gen. Hancock's corps, losing 16 officers and men. The original members of the regiment were mustered out on Aug. 15, 1864, and the veterans and recruits to the number of 238 men, were transferred to the 7th Me. afterwards organized as the 1st Regiment Veteran Volunteers.

== Casualties ==
The regiment lost a total of 255 men during service; 12 officers and 141 enlisted men killed or mortally wounded, 2 officers and 100 enlisted men died of disease.

== Commanding officers ==
- Colonel Abner Knowles
- Colonel Hiram Burnham
- Colonel Benjamin F. Harris

== Notable members ==
- First Lieutenant Charles A. Clark, adjutant - Medal of Honor recipient for action at Brooks Ford, Virginia, May 4, 1863
- Sergeant Otis O. Roberts, Company H - Medal of Honor recipient for action at the Second Battle of Rappahannock Station
- Brigadier general of volunteers Henry Prince, Company K

== See also ==
- List of Maine Civil War units
- Maine in the American Civil War
