= Thomas W. Hyde =

American politician (1841–1899)

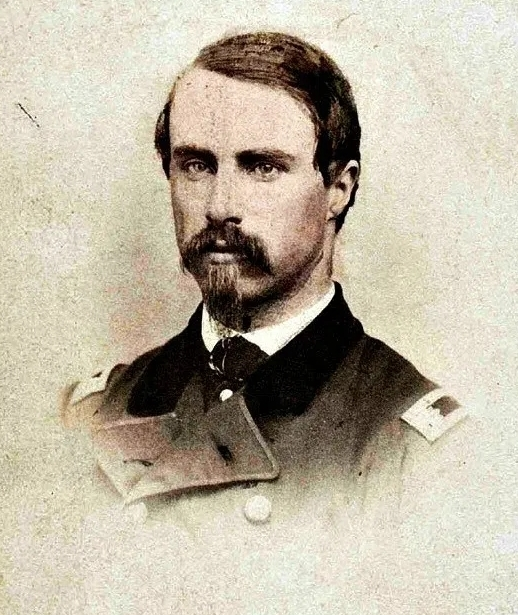
- Born: January 16, 1841; Florence, Italy
- Died: December 14, 1899 (aged 58); Fort Monroe, Virginia, U.S.
- Burial place: Oak Grove Cemetery, Bath, Maine
- Military career
- Allegiance: United States of America; Union
- Branch: United States Army; Union Army
- Service years: 1861 - 1865
- Rank: Colonel; Brevet Major General
- Unit: 7th Maine Volunteer Infantry
- Commands: 1st Maine Veteran Volunteer Infantry Regiment
- Conflicts: American Civil War; *Second Battle of Bull Run; *Battle of Antietam; *Battle of Gettysburg
- Awards: Medal of Honor
- Other work: Senator, Mayor, Founder of Bath Iron Works

Thomas Worcester Hyde (January 16, 1841 – December 14, 1899) was an American Union Army colonel, a state senator from Maine, and the founder of the Bath Iron Works, one of the major shipyards in the United States. He wrote two books about his experiences during the American Civil War and at the Battle of Gettysburg.

== Biography ==
Born in Florence, Italy, to Zina and Eleanor Hyde, natives of Bath, Maine, Hyde graduated from Bowdoin College in 1861 and then from the Old University of Chicago, now Northwestern University Pritzker School of Law.

Hyde began his Union Army service on April 2, 1861, as a Major in the 7th Maine Volunteer Infantry Regiment. On February 26, 1863, he became Assistant Inspector General of the Sixth Corps of the Army of the Potomac, which was commanded by Major General William F. "Baldy" Smith. He was promoted to Lieutenant Colonel on December 1, 1863. In 1864, he became Provost Marshal General of the Sixth Corps.

On September 24, 1864, Hyde transferred to the 1st Maine Veteran Volunteer Infantry Regiment and was promoted to Colonel on October 22, 1864. Hyde commanded Brigade 3, Division 2, VI Corps of the Army of the Shenandoah between October 30, 1864, and December 6, 1864, and the same brigade in the Army of the Potomac from December 6, 1864 (when the Army of the Shenandoah returned from its detached duty to the Army of the Potomac) until June 28, 1865. Despite this service, Hyde did not receive promotion to full rank brigadier general.

While serving under Major General John Sedgwick early in the war, Hyde was present at several key Civil War battles, including the Second Battle of Bull Run, the Battle of Antietam (for which he later received the Medal of Honor), and the Battle of Gettysburg. He was also present at Confederate General Robert E. Lee's 1865 surrender of the Army of Northern Virginia at Appomattox Court House, Virginia. Hyde was discharged from the volunteer army on June 28, 1865.

On January 13, 1866, President Andrew Johnson nominated Hyde for appointment as a brevet Brigadier General of volunteers to rank from April 2, 1865 and was confirmed by the U.S. Senate to the appointment on March 12, 1866. On February 17, 1869, President Johnson nominated Hyde for the brevet grade of Major General of volunteers, to rank from April 2, 1865, and was confirmed by the U.S. Senate to the appointment on March 3, 1869, one of the last brevet Major General awards for Civil War service.

Starting in 1873, Hyde served three terms in the Maine Senate, including two as president. He became mayor of Bath, Maine in 1878.

In 1884, he founded Bath Iron Works and became general manager of it in 1888. Since it was founded, the shipyard has executed more than 425 shipbuilding contracts, including 245 for the U.S. Navy.

In 1894, he was named president of the Boston Elevated Railway Company.

Hyde wrote the books Following the Greek Cross Or, Memories Of The Sixth Army Corps (1894) and Recollections of the Battle of Gettysburg (1898).

Hyde died on November 15, 1899, at Fort Monroe, Virginia, after a short illness. He was buried in Oak Grove Cemetery, Bath, Maine.

== Medal of Honor citation ==
Rank and organization: Major, 7th Maine Infantry. Place and date: At Antietam, Md., 17 September 1862. Entered service at: Bath, Maine. Birth: Italy. Date of issue: 8 April 1891. His citation read:

Led his regiment in an assault on a strong body of the enemy's infantry and kept up the fight until the greater part of his men had been killed or wounded, bringing the remainder safely out of the fight.

== See also ==
- List of American Civil War Medal of Honor recipients: G–L
- List of American Civil War brevet Generals (Union)
