= Charles A. Clark =

American soldier in the American Civil War

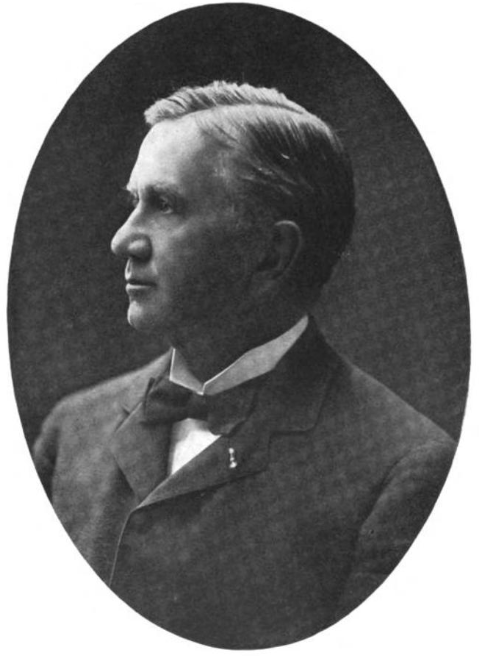
- Born: Charles Amory Clark; January 26, 1841; Sangerville, Maine
- Died: December 22, 1913 (aged 72); Cedar Rapids, Iowa
- Burial place: Oak Hill Cemetery
- Military career
- Allegiance: United States of America
- Branch: United States Army; Union Army
- Service years: 1861–1864
- Rank: Captain; Brevet Lieutenant Colonel
- Unit: 6th Regiment Maine Volunteer Infantry
- Awards: Medal of Honor

Signature
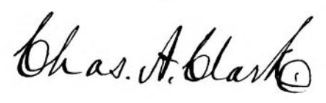

Charles Amory Clark (January 26, 1841 – December 22, 1913) was an American soldier who fought in the American Civil War. Clark received the country's highest award for bravery during combat, the Medal of Honor, for his action at Brooks Ford, Virginia on May 4, 1863. He was honored with the award on May 13, 1896.

== Biography ==
Clark was born in Sangerville, Maine on January 26, 1841. He enlisted with the 6th Maine Infantry in July 1861, and was commissioned as a lieutenant in February 1862. He later served as captain and assistant adjutant general of volunteers from May to October 1864.

After the war, he worked as a lawyer in Cedar Rapids, Iowa. He was active in the Grand Army of the Republic, and was elected its national judge advocate general in 1905 and the department commander of Iowa in 1906. He was also a companion of the Iowa Commandery of the Military Order of the Loyal Legion of the United States. He was named a regent of the University of Iowa in 1907.

Clark died at his home in Cedar Rapids on December 22, 1913, and his remains are interred at the Oak Hill Cemetery.

== Medal of Honor citation ==
Having voluntarily taken command of his regiment in the absence of its commander, at great personal risk and with remarkable presence of mind and fertility of resource led the command down an exceedingly precipitous embankment to the Rappahannock River and by his gallantry, coolness, and good judgment in the face of the enemy saved the command from capture or destruction.

== See also ==
- List of American Civil War Medal of Honor recipients: A–F
