= Oak Hill Cemetery (Cedar Rapids, Iowa) =

Historic rural cemetery in Linn County

- Oak Hill Cemetery Historic District
- U.S. National Register of Historic Places
- U.S. Historic district
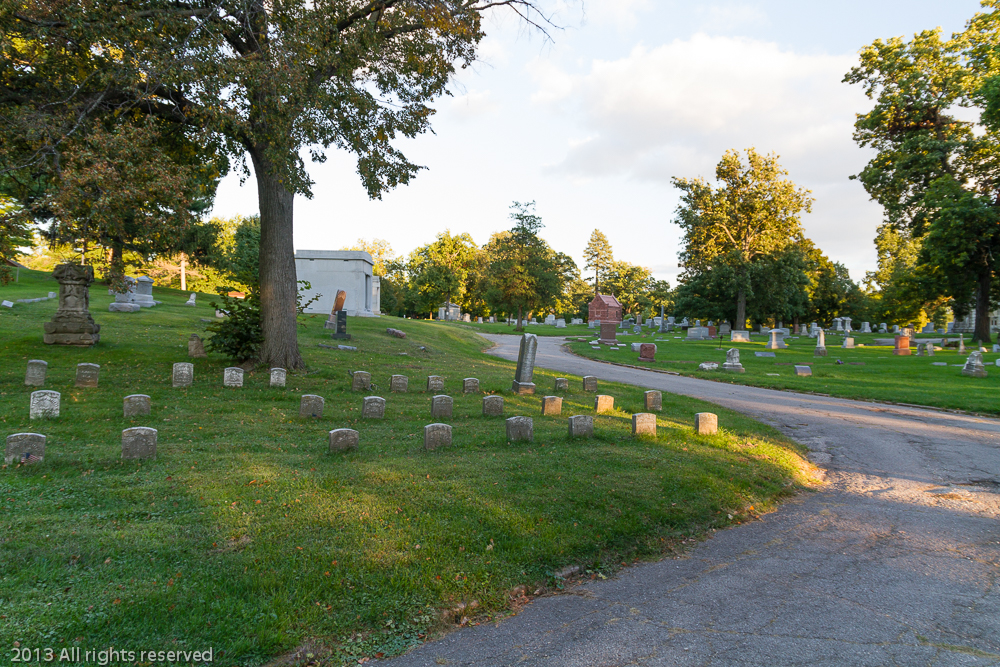

- Location within Iowa Location within the United States
- Location: Roughly bounded by Mt. Vernon Rd., SE, 15th St., SE, S. & E. lot lines, Cedar Rapids, Iowa
- Coordinates: 41°58′33.3″N 91°38′44.8″W
- Area: 36.1 acres (14.6 ha)
- Architect: Horace William Shaler Cleveland; Ossian Cole Simonds
- Architectural style: Late 19th and Early 20th Century American Movements
- NRHP reference No.: 13000243
- Added to NRHP: May 8, 2013

Oak Hill Cemetery is a rural cemetery located in Cedar Rapids, Iowa, United States. It was listed as a historic district on the National Register of Historic Places in 2013. At the time of its nomination it consisted of 17 resources, which included 13 contributing buildings, one contributing site, two contributing structures, and one contributing object.

== History ==
Cedar Rapids was platted on the east bank of the Cedar River as Rapids City in 1841, and it was incorporated in 1849. The first burials in the town were in what was called the village cemetery. It was located at what is now Eighth Street and Fifth Avenue SE. Oak Hill Cemetery was established as Rose Hill, also known as Mount Washington, in 1853 on farmland outside of town that belonged to Gabriel Carpenter and Freeman Smith. The graves in the village cemetery were relocated here. They include some of the founders of Cedar Rapids.

Chicago landscape architect Horace W.S. Cleveland was employed in 1869 and again in 1880 to prepare a plan for cemetery improvements giving it a rural picturesque landscape design. The Cedar Rapids architectural firm of Josselyn & Taylor designed the main entryway on the northwest corner of the cemetery in 1908 as a memorial to Lawson Daniels. It is composed of a gable-roofed shelter house, rustic stone walls and gateposts of cut glacial boulders, and decorative iron gates. Landscape architect, Ossian C. Simonds was hired in 1911 to redesign a portion of the cemetery's landscape. The buildings that contribute to the historic nature of the cemetery include the caretaker's house and garage, the barn, the gateway shelter house, and nine mausoleums. The contributing structures include the stone walls and gateposts. The contributing objects include gravestones and monuments that are counted as a single object. The designed landscape is the contributing site.

== Notable burials ==
- Charles A. Clark, Civil War Medal of Honor recipient
- Edgar E. Clark, Grand Senior Conductor of the Order of Railway Conductors and Interstate Commerce Commission commissioner
- Walter Donald Douglas, businessman who died in the Titanic disaster
- John Ely, state-level politician instrumental in abolishing capital punishment in Iowa
- John Taylor Hamilton, United States House of Representatives 1891-1893
- George Greene, Iowa Supreme Court justice
- Henry Otis Pratt, United States House of Representatives 1873–1877
