= Michael Ankeny =

American alpine ski racer (born 1991)

Michael Ankeny (born January 17, 1991, in Deephaven, Minnesota) is an American alpine ski racer.
