= 1st Maine Veteran Infantry Regiment =

- Active: August 21, 1864, to June 28, 1865
- Country: United States
- Allegiance: Union
- Branch: United States Army
- Type: Infantry
- Part of: 3rd Brigade, 2nd Division, VI Corps, Army of the Shenandoah
- Engagements: Battle of Opequon; Battle of Fisher's Hill; Battle of Cedar Creek; Siege of Petersburg; Battle of Sailor's Creek; Battle of Appomattox Court House

Insignia
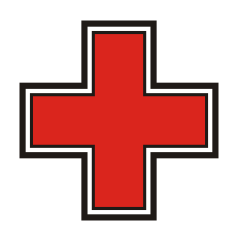
- VI Corps Badge

The 1st Maine Veteran Infantry Regiment was an infantry regiment that served in the Union Army during the American Civil War.

== Service ==
The 1st Maine Veteran Infantry was organized in Charleston, Virginia August 21, 1864, by consolidation of the 5th Maine Infantry, 6th Maine Infantry, and 7th Maine Infantry.

The regiment was attached to 3rd Brigade, 2nd Division, VI Corps, Army of the Shenandoah and Army of the Potomac, to June 1865.

The 1st Maine Veteran Infantry mustered out of service June 28, 1865, in Washington, D.C.

== Detailed service ==
Skirmishes near Charleston, Va., August 21–22, 1864. Demonstration on Gilbert's Ford, Opequart, September 13. Battle of Opequon, Winchester, September 19. Fisher's Hill September 22. Battle of Cedar Creek October 19. Duty at Kernstown and vicinity until December. March to Washington, D.C., December 9, then moved to Petersburg, Va. Siege of Petersburg December 12, 1864, to April 2, 1865. Fort Fisher, Petersburg, March 25–27, 1865. Assault on and fall of Petersburg April 2. Sayler's Creek April 6. Appomattox Court House April 9. Surrender of Lee and his army. March to Danville, Va., and provost duty there until June. Moved to Washington, D.C.. Corps Review June 9.

== Casualties ==
The regiment lost a total of 86 men during service; 6 officers and 40 enlisted men killed or mortally wounded, 40 enlisted men died of disease.

== Notable members ==
- Colonel Thomas Worcester Hyde, Commanding Officer - Medal of Honor recipient (as part of the 7th Maine Infantry) for action at Antietam, Maryland, September 17, 1862
- Corporal George H. Littlefield, Company G - Medal of Honor recipient for action at Fort Fisher, Virginia, March 25, 1865

== See also ==
- List of Maine Civil War units
- Maine in the American Civil War
