= Pauly Burke =

American cyclist (born 1974)

Pauly Burke (born February 3, 1974, in Cedar Rapids, Iowa) is a former professional road racing cyclist. He is now living in Manhattan.

Pauly Burke signing pre race autographs- Koln Germany 2001

== Cycling career ==
As a professional road racing cyclist, Pauly raced for the Landbouwkrediet-Colnago, Tonissteiner, and the IPSO-Euroclean professional cycling teams; all based in Belgium.

As an amateur, Pauly rode for US Montauban (France) and Kingsnorth Int. Wheelers (UK). He is also a former member of the U.S. National Cycling team.

== Post cycling career ==
Pauly graduated from the Circle in the Square Theatre School in New York City. He currently resides in Manhattan.
