= John Ely (Iowa politician) =

American politician (1919–2007)

Member of the Iowa Senate
- In office January 9, 1965 – January 12, 1969
- Constituency: 20th district (1965–1967); 24th district (1967–1969)

Member of the Iowa House of Representatives from the 48th district
- In office January 9, 1961 – January 11, 1965

Personal details
- Born: John Montague Ely Jr. February 17, 1919 Cedar Rapids, Iowa, U.S.
- Died: March 30, 2007 (aged 88) Cedar Rapids, Iowa, U.S.
- Party: Democratic
- Spouse: Polly Ward (m. 1942)
- Children: 3
- Education: Princeton University

John Montague Ely Jr. (February 17, 1919 – March 30, 2007) was an American Democratic politician, purchasing agent, and civil rights activist who served two terms in the Iowa House of Representatives and Iowa State Senate from 1961 to 1969. Ely was instrumental in abolishing capital punishment in Iowa.

== Early years and education ==
Ely was born in Cedar Rapids, Iowa, to John Montague Ely Sr. and Laurel Sullivan Ely. He graduated from Franklin High School and was educated at Coe College, the University of Iowa, and Princeton University where he received his degree in 1941. Ely served as a purser in the United States Merchant Marine from 1942 to 1945.

== Political career ==
Ely served from January 9, 1961, to January 10, 1965, in the Iowa House of Representatives, representing the 48th District (Linn County), and as a member of the Iowa State Senate from January 11, 1965, to January 12, 1969, representing the 20th (Polk County) and 24th (Linn County) Districts respectively.

Ely's signature achievements were the successful repeal of Iowa's death penalty in 1965, his co-sponsorship of the Fair Housing Bill of Iowa, and his efforts towards establishing the Iowa Civil Rights Commission and passing the Iowa Civil Rights Act of 1965 and the Open Housing Law of 1967.

=== Opposition to capital punishment ===
Ely opposition to capital punishment was reinforced after he voluntarily witnessed the execution of Victor Feguer on March 15, 1963, the most recent execution in Iowa, and the last federal execution in the United States until the execution of Timothy McVeigh on June 11, 2001. Shortly before McVeigh's execution, Ely recounted his memories of Fuguer's execution to The New York Times, recalling that at the moment of the hanging, Feguer appeared to have taken a breath; Ely turned to the journalist next to him and said "Look, George, human life fighting to preserve itself", though he later realized that the movement was actually an involuntary reflex of the corpse.

With the support of Governor Harold Hughes, Ely helped lead efforts to abolish Iowa's death penalty in 1965. In the 1990s, there was an unsuccessful effort in Iowa to re-introduce capital punishment, and Ely advised legislators who were in opposition.

== Later years ==
Ely continued to work for the Quaker Oats Company until he retired in 1984. Among Ely's activities later in life was his work as a "citizen-lobbyist", pressing Congress for micro-enterprise, free primary education in developing countries, and the Global Health Fund which sought to combat HIV/AIDS. Ely was also a mentor to countless young people in the Cedar Rapids area, many of whom went on to be community leaders and activists.

== Personal life, death, and legacy ==
Ely married Polly (Shirley Ward) Ely on June 20, 1942, and they had three children. He was active with the NAACP, the ACLU, and Planned Parenthood. He was a Unitarian Universalist.

Ely died from complications of surgery in St. Luke's Hospital in Cedar Rapids on March 30, 2007, at the age of 88. His cremated remains were inurned in Oak Hill Cemetery.

Later in 2007, John Ely's wife, Polly Ely, accepted the Iowans Against The Death Penalty Gov. Harold E. Hughes Award on his behalf. Polly Ely died on May 15, 2008, also aged 88. Ely was remembered in 2009 in a joint memorial service for twenty-five deceased Iowa lawmakers, held at the State Senate.

Iowa House of Representatives
| Preceded by | Member of the Iowa House of Representatives for the 48th District; January 9, 1961 – January 11, 1965 | Succeeded by |
Iowa Senate
| Preceded by | Member of the Iowa Senate for the 20th District; January 11, 1965 – January 8, 1967 | Succeeded by |
| Preceded by | Member of the Iowa Senate for the 24th District; January 9, 1967 – January 12, 1969 | Succeeded by |
