= M. W. Miles =

American politician (1850–1901)

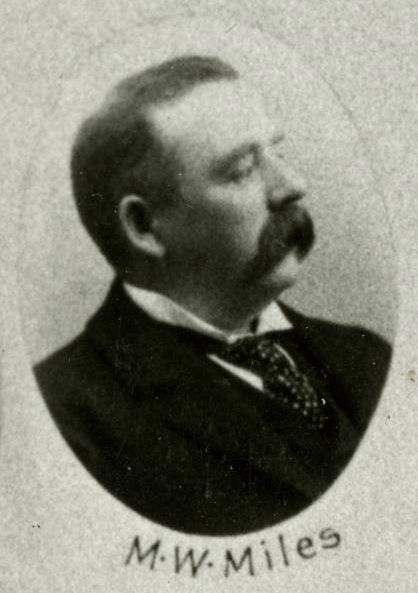
- Miles in 1895

Member of the Washington House of Representatives for the 17th district
- In office 1895–1897

Personal details
- Born: June 14, 1850 near Cedar Rapids, Iowa, United States
- Died: February 8, 1901 (aged 50) Waterville, Washington, United States
- Party: Republican

Mastain William (Matt) Miles (June 14, 1850 – February 8, 1901) was an American politician in the state of Washington. He lived in Waverly, Iowa for 25 years and became postmaster in Waterville, Washington. He served in the Washington House of Representatives from 1895 to 1897.
