= George H. Littlefield =

- Born: May 2, 1842; Skowhegan, Maine
- Died: December 25, 1919 (aged 77)
- Military career
- Allegiance: United States of America; Union
- Branch: United States Army; Union Army
- Rank: Corporal
- Units: Company G, 1st Maine Veteran Infantry
- Conflicts: American Civil War
- Awards: Medal of Honor

George H. Littlefield (May 2, 1842 – December 25, 1919) was a corporal in the Union Army and a Medal of Honor recipient for his actions in the American Civil War.

== Medal of Honor citation ==
Rank and organization: Corporal, Company G, 1st Maine Veteran Infantry. Place and date: At Fort Fisher, Va., March 25, 1865. Entered service at: Skowhegan, Maine. Birth: Skowhegan, Maine. Date of issue: June 22, 1885.

Citation:

The color Corporal having been wounded, this soldier picked up the flag and bore it to the front, to the great encouragement of the charging column.

== See also ==
- List of Medal of Honor recipients
- List of American Civil War Medal of Honor recipients: G–L
