= Walter Donald Douglas =

American businessman (1861–1912)

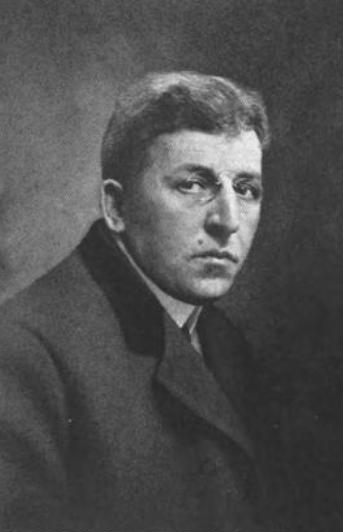
- Born: April 21, 1861; Waterloo, Iowa, U.S.
- Died: April 15, 1912 (aged 50); North Atlantic Ocean
- Resting place: Oak Hill Cemetery; Cedar Rapids, Iowa, U.S.
- Occupation: Business executive
- Spouses: Lulu Camp (m. 1884; died 1899) Mahala Dutton (m. 1907)
- Children: 2

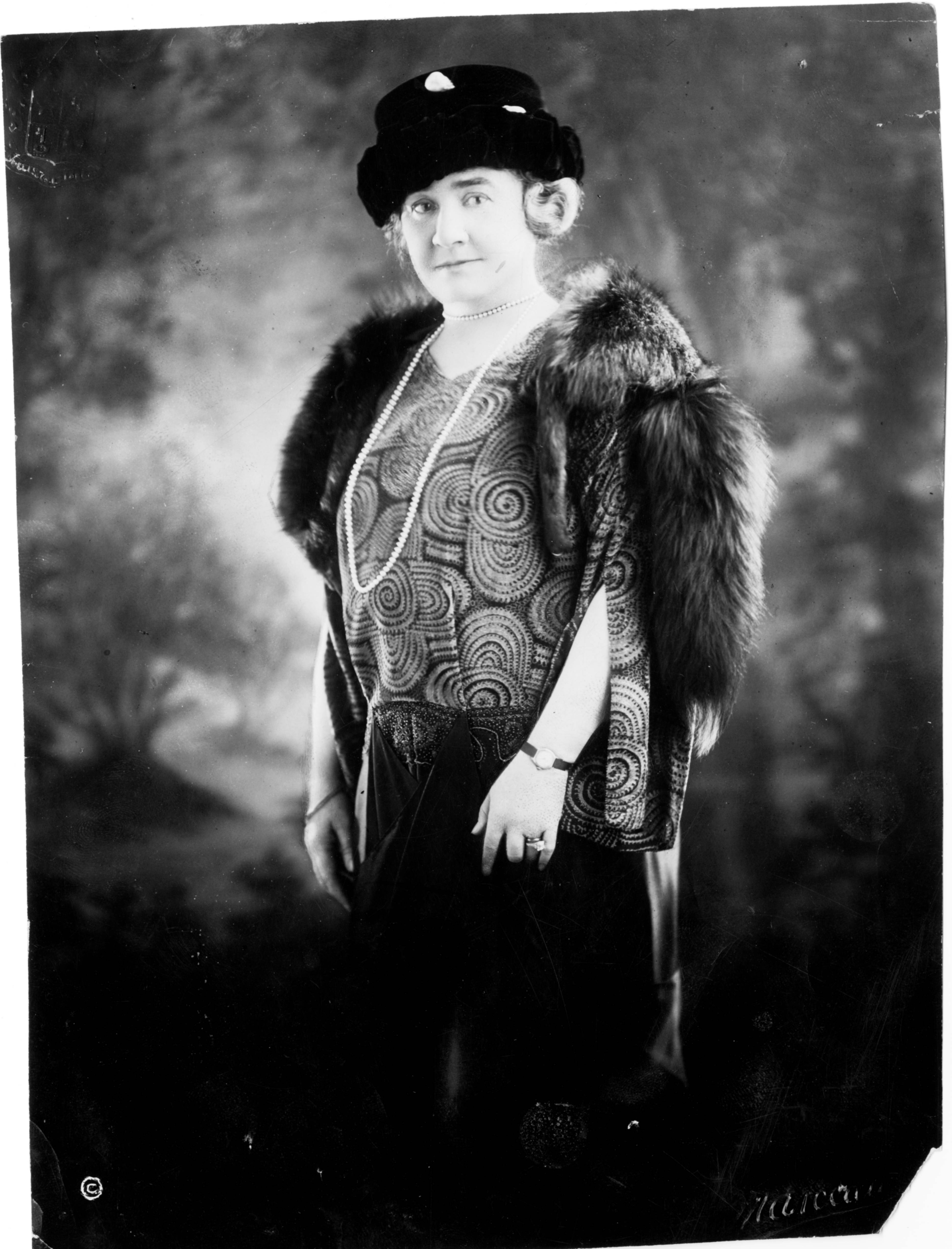
Mahala Douglas in 1923

Walter Donald Douglas (April 21, 1861 – April 15, 1912) was an American business executive who traveled first class aboard the Titanic with his wife, Mahala, and maid, Berthe Leroy, in cabin C-86.

== Early life and businesses ==
Douglas was born in Waterloo, Iowa, to George Douglas and Margaret Boyd Douglas. His parents had both immigrated to the United States; George Douglas was Scottish and Margaret Boyd was Irish. His father was one of the co-founders of the Quaker Oats Company.

After attending high school, Douglas attended the Shattuck Military Academy in Faribault, Minnesota. He married Lulu Camp on May 19, 1884, with whom he had two sons, Edward Bruce and George Camp. Lulu died in December 1899, and eight years later, on November 6, 1907, Douglas was married to Mahala Dutton.

Douglas and his brother George founded the Douglas Starchworks, at the time the largest starch factory west of the Mississippi. The Starchworks later became Penick and Ford and subsequently, Penford Food Ingredients, a division of Penford Corporation. He also had interests in the linseed oil business in Minneapolis, manufacturing under the name of the Midland Linseed Oil Company, which was sold in 1899 to the American Linseed Oil Company, eventually evolving into the Archer Daniels Midland Company. In 1899, after selling his linseed business, Douglas became a partner with Piper, Johnson & Case, a grain firm, where he remained until he retired in 1912.

Douglas was associated with several businesses, including the Canadian Elevator Company, the Monarch Lumber Company and the Saskatchewan Valley Land Company, among others. He was also a stockholder, executive board member, and one of the directors of the Empire Elevator Company, and was a member of the executive board of the Quaker Oats Company. He was also among the directors of the First National Bank of Minneapolis.

== RMS Titanic ==
Douglas, who had retired on 1 January 1912, was known as a "Captain of Industry," having amassed a fortune of over $4 million. He and his wife spent three months in Europe looking for furnishings for their new home near Lake Minnetonka before booking return passage to the United States aboard the RMS Titanic. Douglas died in the sinking, and his body was the 62nd to be recovered by the CS Mackay-Bennett. The following was recorded in the Mackey-Bennett's logbook:

No. 62.

Sex: male. Estimated age: 55. Hair grey.

Clothing:- Evening dress, with W. D. D. on shirt.

Effects:- Gold watch, chain, and sov. case with W.D.D.
Gold cigar cutter, gold pencil case, gold knife "WDD", gold cigarette case "WDD", five gold studs.
Wedding ring on finger engraved "May 19th, '84.
Pocket letter case with $551.00, and 5 pound note.

1st Class. Name:- Walter D. Douglas.

As he was easily identifiable as a first-class passenger, Douglas' body was not buried at sea, instead being embalmed and brought to Canada aboard the Mackey-Bennett. It was subsequently taken to Cedar Rapids to be buried in the Douglas family mausoleum at Oak Hill Cemetery. His wife survived the sinking along with their maid. Mahala Douglas was one of the very first survivors to board the RMS Carpathia in the early morning hours of 15 April. She had helped Fourth Officer Joseph Boxhall in manning the tiller of Emergency Cutter No. 2 until their boat pulled alongside the ship. Upon her death in 1945 she was buried beside him.

A provision in Douglas' will required that George C. Douglas, his younger son from his first marriage, earn $2,500 in two consecutive years, in order to receive his share of the estate, but this provision was waived by the trustees of the will because the son had served in the British Army for five years during World War I, being wounded twice and being cited for bravery by Field Marshal Lord French.
