= 7th Maine Infantry Regiment =

- Active: August 21, 1861, to August 21, 1864
- Country: United States
- Allegiance: Union
- Branch: Infantry
- Equipment: Rifled muskets
- Engagements: American Civil War; Peninsula Campaign; Maryland Campaign; Chancellorsville Campaign; Gettysburg campaign; Bristoe Campaign; Mine Run Campaign; Battle of the Wilderness; Battle of Spotsylvania; Battle of Cold Harbor; Siege of Petersburg; Battle of Jerusalem Plank Road; Battle of Fort Stevens; Sheridan's Valley Campaign of 1864

The 7th Maine Infantry Regiment was an infantry regiment that served in the Union Army during the American Civil War. It participated in most of the campaigns and battles of the Army of the Potomac in the Eastern Theater.

== Service ==
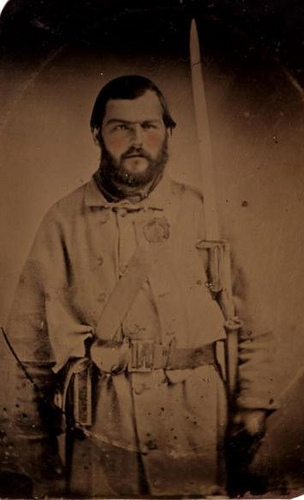
George Pepper, 7th Maine Volunteer Infantry Regiment

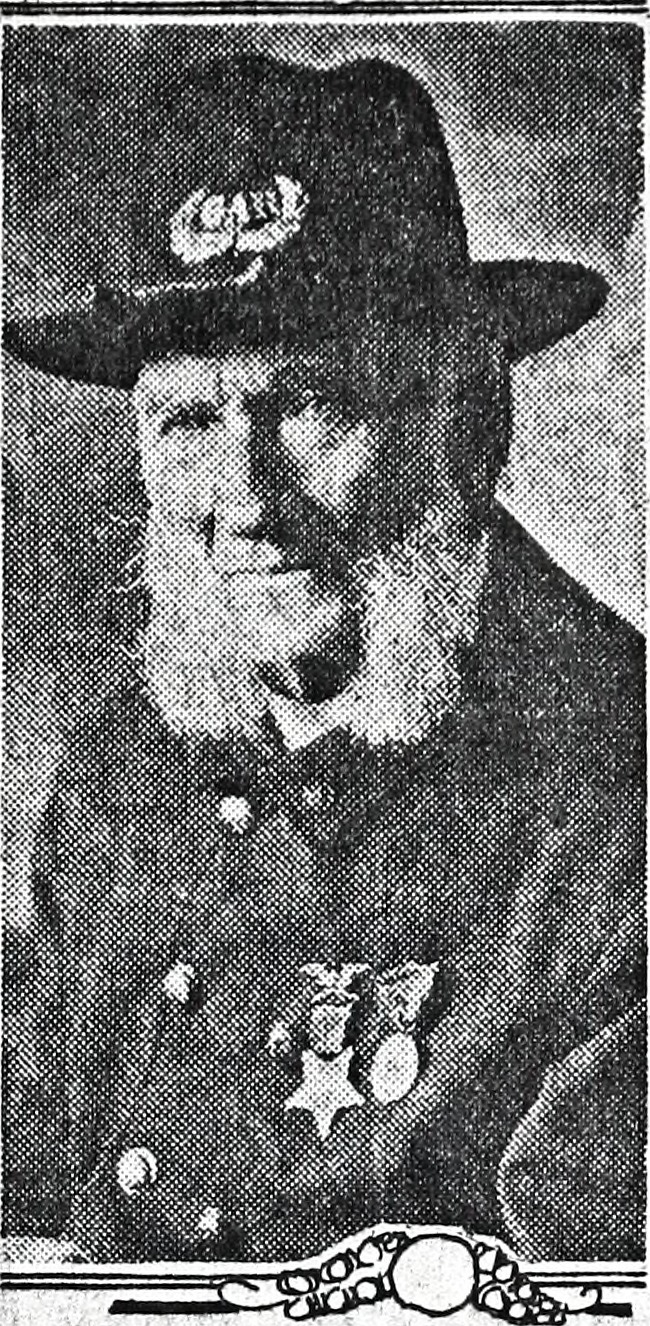
Sgt Andrew Jackson Kimball of the 7th Maine

The 7th Maine was organized at Augusta, Maine, and mustered into Federal service for a three-year enlistment on August 21, 1861. After organization and training, the regiment left the state for Baltimore, Maryland, on August 23. Subsequently, it was attached to Dix's Division and assigned to duty in the city until October 25, 1861. The 7th was then assigned to Davidson's Brigade, W. F. Smith's Division, Army of the Potomac, until March 1862. It moved to Washington, D.C., and was on duty at Georgetown Heights until November 7. From there, the 7th camped at Lewinsville, Virginia, until March 1862. It was then part of the brigade's advance on Manassas, Virginia, from March 10–15.

The regiment was then assigned to the 3rd Brigade, 2nd Division, 4th Army Corps, Army of the Potomac, to May 1862. It subsequently returned to Alexandria, Virginia, and thence moved to Fort Monroe on March 23–24. It took part in the brigade's reconnaissance to Watt's Creek from March 27–31.

The 7th was reassigned to the 3rd Brigade, 2nd Division, 6th Army Corps. In the spring and early summer of 1862, the regiment participated in Maj. Gen. George B. McClellan's Peninsula Campaign. Specific engagements included the following:

- Siege of Yorktown April 5 – May 4
- Battle of Williamsburg May 5
- Advance up the Peninsula May 9–13
- At White House, Virginia, until May 19
- Battle of Mechanicsville May 23–24.
- Seven Days Battles before Richmond June 25 – July 1
- Battle of Garnett's & Golding's Farm June 27–28
- Battle of Savage's Station June 29
- Battle of White Oak Swamp and Battle of Glendale June 30
- Battle of Malvern Hill July 1

With the end of the unsuccessful campaign, the 7th remained stationary at Harrison's Landing until August 15, when it moved to Fort Monroe. Subsequently, it was stationed at Centreville, Virginia, until August 31. Although it did not directly participate in the Second Battle of Manassas, the 7th assisted in checking Pope's rout at Bull Run on August 30 and covered the army's retreat to Fairfax Court House on September 1. The 7th then took part in McClellan's Maryland Campaign that September and October, seeing action in the Battle of Crampton's Gap on South Mountain on September 14. It also was present for the Battle of Antietam on September 17.

Their ranks thinned by the almost continuous campaigning, the 7th Maine was ordered home to recruit fresh troops in October. It remained in Portland, Maine, until January 21, 1863, when it was transported back to Northern Virginia. The 7th joined its brigade and division at White Oak Church on January 25. It then took part in the operations at Franklin's Crossing from April 29-May 2 during the Chancellorsville Campaign. It was part of the successful attack on Maryes Heights during the Second Battle of Fredericksburg on May 3 and the fight at Salem Church on May 3–4. The 7th participated in the great Battle of Gettysburg on July 2–4, and engaged the Confederates several times during their subsequent retreat to Virginia (actions were at Fairfield July 5 and near Funkstown, Maryland, on July 10–13). During the autumn, the regiment was involved in the Bristoe Campaign from October 9–22 and the Second Battle of Rappahannock Station on November 7. It then participated in the Mine Run Campaign from November 26-December 2.

After spending the winter stationary in its camp in Virginia, the 7th was part of Ulysses S. Grant's Overland Campaign from the Rapidan River to the James River between May 3-June 15, 1864. it fought in the Battle of the Wilderness May 5–7; Spotsylvania May 8–12 (including attacking the "Bloody Angle" on May 12). It was then part of the action along the North Anna River May 23–26 and was on the Federal line along the Pamunkey from May 26–28. Other actions included Totopotomoy May 28–31, Cold Harbor June 1–12, and the Siege of Petersburg from June 17-July 9, as well as the Battle of Jerusalem Plank Road on June 22–23. The Maine boys then moved to Washington, D.C., July 9–11 and helped repulse Jubal A. Early's attack on Washington on July 11–12. They were then a part of Philip H. Sheridan's Shenandoah Valley Campaign from August 7–21.

The regiment was mustered out at Charlestown, Virginia, on August 21, 1864. The veterans whose enlistments had not yet expired and the recent recruits were transferred to the 1st Maine Veteran Infantry. Those men whose term was over returned home to Maine via train.

== Total strength and casualties ==
1,505 men served in the 7th Maine Infantry Regiment at one point or another during its service. Of these. 152 were killed in action or died of their wounds; 403 men were wounded; another 212 died of various diseases while in the service, and 19 men perished in Confederate prisoner-of-war camps.

== Commanders ==
- Lt. Col. Seldon Connor – August 21, 1861, to May 5, 1864. (Promoted to colonel in January 1864; severely wounded in the Wilderness)
- Col. Edwin Mason – May 6 to August 21, 1864 (mustered out with the regiment)

== See also ==
- List of Maine Civil War units
- Maine in the American Civil War
