= John Lee Chapman =

American politician (1811–1880)

23rd Mayor of Baltimore
- In office January 6, 1862 – November 4, 1867
- Preceded by: Charles J. Baker
- Succeeded by: Robert T. Banks

Personal details
- Born: 1811 Maryland, U.S.
- Died: November 18, 1880 (aged 68–69) Baltimore, Maryland, U.S.
- Resting place: Green Mount Cemetery; Baltimore, Maryland, U.S.
- Party: Whig; Union Party
- Spouse(s): Elizabeth Chapman (m. 1835, died) Alice Thompson (m. 1871)
- Children: 7
- Occupation: Politician; glass maker; railroad executive

John Lee Chapman (1811 – November 18, 1880) was Mayor of Baltimore from 1862 to 1867. He also operated Maryland Glass Works in Baltimore and served as president of the Western Maryland Railway.

== Early life ==
John Lee Chapman was born in 1811, in Fell's Point, Baltimore or Harford County, Maryland. He was born to parents with Scottish ancestry. He moved to Baltimore at an early age.

== Career ==
Chapman worked as a clerk in a drug store at Baltimore and South Street in Baltimore. He then became a proprietor of a different drug store on South Street. Chapman then worked with his brother Jonathan in the glass business. He took over the business of his uncle George Chapman, Chapman's Glass Works, on Charles Street. He built Maryland Glass Works at Fell's Point around 1847 or 1848. He continued producing glassware until 1862.

Before the American Civil War, Chapman was a Whig, but he joined the Union Party following the war. He served as a member of the first branch of the Baltimore City Council from 1860 to 1861. After the arrest of Mayor George William Brown, John C. Blackburn succeeded him as mayor due to his role as president of the first branch. Chapman was elected to the first branch of the Baltimore City Council again on October 9, 1861. The role of mayor then passed to Charles J. Baker in October 1861. At the first session on January 6, 1862, Chapman was elected as president of the first branch. He then replaced Baker as ex officio mayor of Baltimore. He served the remainder of Brown's term, and served again as mayor for three additional terms, from November 12, 1862, to November 4, 1867. His last term was only one year due to the new state constitution adopted in 1867.

After serving as mayor, Chapman served as president of the Western Maryland Railway from November 1866. He remained in that role for two years. He was investigated for his role, while mayor, in supporting a rival western railway to the Baltimore and Ohio Railroad. In 1869, Chapman was appointed by President Ulysses S. Grant as naval officer of the Port of Baltimore. He remained in that role until 1873 when he was succeeded by General Adam E. King. He was later appointed by Colonel Wilkins as superintendent of public stores at the Port of Baltimore. He remained in that role until it was abolished in 1877.

== Personal life ==
Chapman married his cousin Elizabeth Chapman, the daughter of George Chapman, around 1835. They had six children. He married Alice Thompson, the daughter of William Thompson, in July 1871. They had one son, John Lee Jr. His other children included Margaret, Florence N. and George.

In the 1860s, Chapman purchased a tract of land in Blue Ridge Summit, Pennsylvania.

Chapman died on November 18, 1880, at the house of his niece in Baltimore. He was buried at Green Mount Cemetery in Baltimore.

== Legacy ==
Druid Lake in Baltimore was originally named Lake Chapman, after Chapman, but the name was changed during the administration of his Democratic successor Robert T. Banks.

Political offices
Preceded by Charles J. Baker	Mayor of Baltimore; 1862–1867	Succeeded by Robert T. Banks
