= Poultney =

Poultney may refer to:

- Poultney (town), Vermont, a town in Rutland County
- Poultney (village), Vermont, a village in Rutland County
- Poultney Bigelow (1855–1954), American journalist and author
- Frankie Poultney (born 1973), professional British adagio ice skater
- Walter de Curzon Poultney (1845–1929), Baltimore socialite and art collector
