= William Spence (disambiguation) =

William Spence (1846–1926) was an Australian trade union leader and politician.

William Spence may also refer to:

- William Spence (burgess), Virginia colonist and member of House of Burgesses
- William Spence (entomologist) (c. 1783–1860), British economist and entomologist
- William Spence (mathematician) (1777–1815), Scottish mathematician
- William Spence (sculptor) (1793–1849), English sculptor based in Liverpool
- William Spence (MP), MP for Sussex
- William Spence (architect) (1806–1883), Scottish architect
- William Blundell Spence (1814–1900), English artist and art dealer
- William Robert Spence (1875–1954), Scottish trade union leader
- William Wallace Spence (1815–1915), Baltimore financier
- William Spence (schoolmaster), 17th-century Scottish schoolmaster imprisoned for teaching Presbyterianism
- William Spence (footballer), English footballer

== See also ==
- Bill Spence (disambiguation)
