= Charles J. Baker =

American politician (1821–1894)

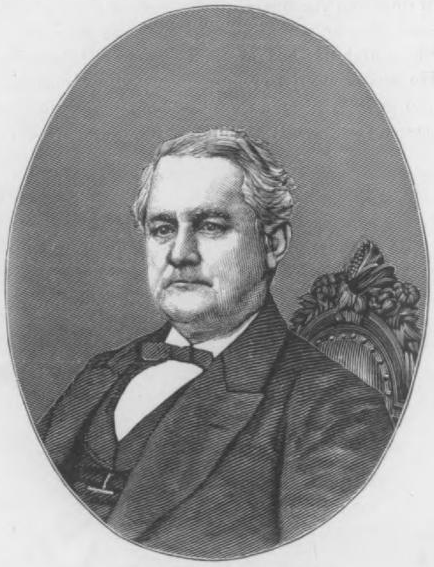
- Baker in 1878 publication

22nd Mayor of Baltimore
- In office October 1861 – January 1862
- Preceded by: John C. Blackburn
- Succeeded by: John Lee Chapman

Personal details
- Born: May 28, 1821 Baltimore, Maryland, U.S.
- Died: September 23, 1894 (aged 73) Baltimore, Maryland, U.S.
- Resting place: Loudon Park Cemetery; Baltimore, Maryland, U.S.
- Spouse(s): Elizabeth Bosserman (m. 1842) Katie
- Children: 7
- Education: Dickinson College
- Occupation: Politician; businessman; banker; newspaper executive

Charles Joseph Baker (May 28, 1821 – September 23, 1894) was an American politician, businessman and banker. He was Mayor of Baltimore temporarily during the American Civil War for 88 days, from October 1861 to January 1862. He was also known for running his family's glass, paints and oils business, Baker Bros. & Co. and serving as the president of Franklin Bank.

== Early life ==
Charles Joseph Baker was born on May 28, 1821, at his father's estate "Friendsbury" in Baltimore. He was educated at schools in Baltimore. He graduated from Dickinson College in Carlisle, Pennsylvania, in 1841. While in college, Baker joined the Methodist Episcopal Church.

== Career ==
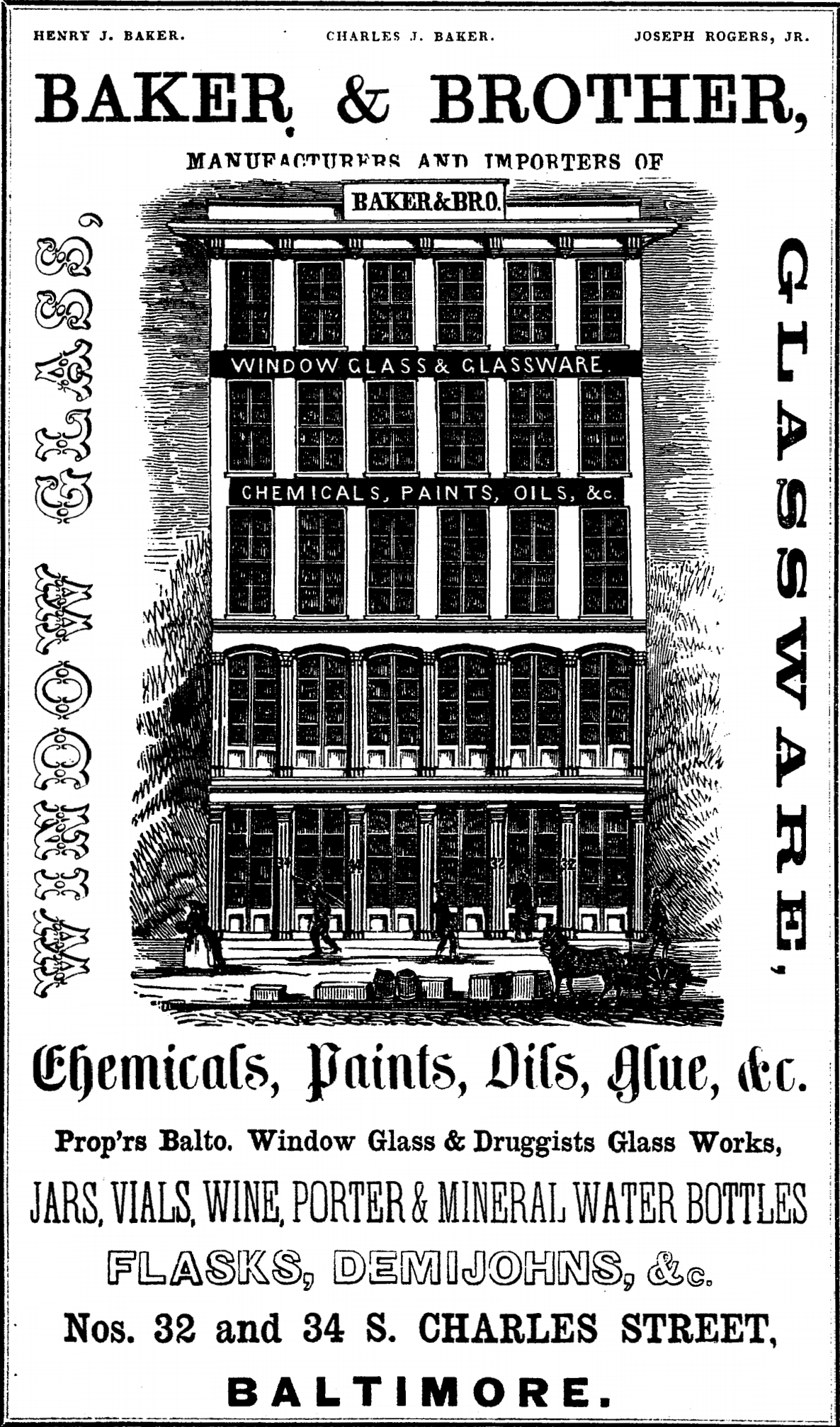
Advertisement for Baker & Brother on S. Charles Street, Baltimore (c. 1857)

Baker worked with his father in the manufacturing of window glass, paints and oils on South Charles Street in Baltimore. In 1865, Baker fully owned the business, Baker Bros. & Co., and brought in his two sons, William and Charles E. Baker, to help. With the help of his brother, Henry J. Baker, they expanded the business to New York City. By 1859, Baker was elected as director of the Franklin Bank on South Street and became president of the bank in 1867. He served in that role for more than twenty years. He retired from the banking business when the Franklin Bank merged into the Equitable National Bank.

Baker became a leader in the municipal reform movement in 1859 and 1860. Baker was elected to the second branch of the Baltimore City Council from the thirtieth ward on October 10, 1860. He also served as president of the second branch, which was the lower house in the two body city council. After the expiration of John C. Blackburn's term as president of the first branch of the Baltimore City Council, Baker became ex officio Mayor of Baltimore, due to him being the next line in succession. He continued the term of Mayor George William Brown, who had been arrested on September 12, 1861. Baker's term as mayor would conclude in January 1862 when John Lee Chapman became president of the first branch and ex officio mayor. In total, Baker served as mayor for 88 days. Baker was not recognized as an acting mayor until 1989 when an archivist realized that three temporary mayors followed the arrest of Mayor Brown. Baker continued his term in the second branch through 1862.

During the American Civil War, Baker disapproved of the separation of the methodist church into the north and south churches. He established and built Chatsworth Church, an Independent Methodist Church, in Baltimore. He also built other Independent Methodist churches and chapels in Baltimore, including Bethany Church, Epworth Church, Friendsbury chapel and St. John's Chapel. Baker also owned a controlling interest in the Baltimore Gazette for a time, but ended up selling his interest.

Baker also worked as director of the Canton Company in 1870, which developed much of the port of East Baltimore. He is credited for helping to bring the Union Railroad to Canton.

== Personal life ==
Baker married Elizabeth Bosserman of Carlisle, Pennsylvania, on January 4, 1842. They had seven children, including Bernard N. Baker, who became president of the Baltimore Storage and Lighterage Company. His other children were William, Charles E., Mary H., Richard J., Frank M. and Ashby Lee. He had a second wife, Katie.

Baker lived at "Athol", a country mansion in Catonsville, Baltimore. built in 1880. He also owned a property called "Tremont".

Baker died on September 23, 1894, at "Athol". He was buried at Loudon Park Cemetery in Baltimore.

== Legacy ==
"Athol" was sold and became a sanitarium after his death. It was purchased by the city in 2006 for historic preservation, but caught fire on September 27, 2021, and burned down.

Political offices
Preceded by John C. Blackburn	Mayor of Baltimore; 1861–1862	Succeeded by John Lee Chapman
