= Garrett Jacobs Mansion =

Historic home in Baltimore, Maryland, U.S.

Coordinates: 39.2972°N 76.6165°W

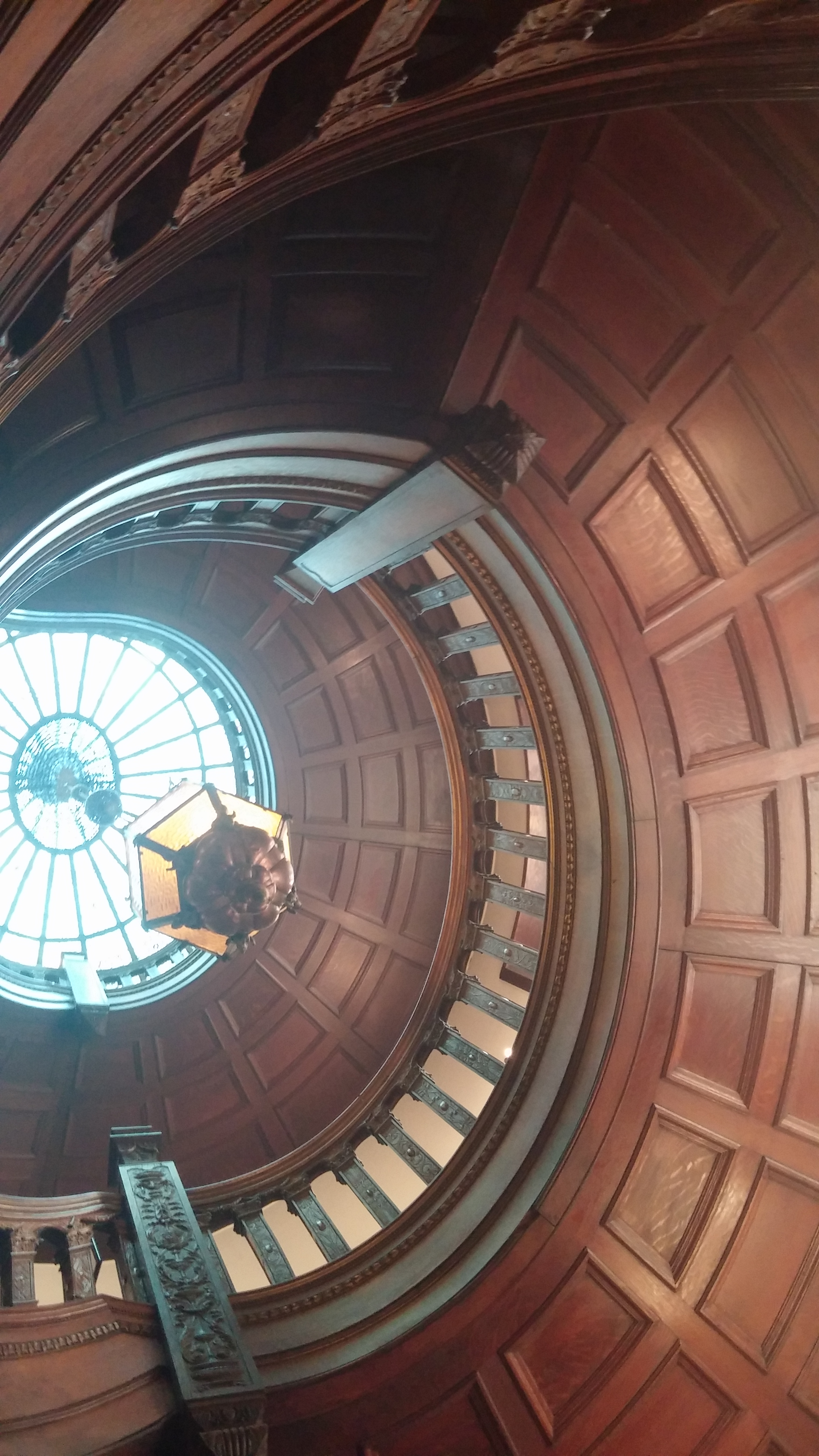
Spiral staircase by Stanford White in entrance hall

The Garrett Jacobs Mansion is a historic home located in the Mount Vernon neighborhood of Baltimore, Maryland. Built in 1853 by Samuel George, the home gets its name from its last and most famous owner, Mary Frick Garrett Jacobs, who, with her husband Robert Garrett, transformed the home into a prime example of the Gilded Age mansions of the city.

== History ==
=== Construction and expansion ===
The mansion encompasses what once was three large row homes. The original Garrett Jacobs home, 11 Mt. Vernon, was built by Samuel George in 1853 on property purchased from John Eager Howard. The property was located in the then-new suburb of Mount Vernon, which was a haven for the newly rich of Baltimore as a place to escape the congestion of the city. The property lay directly across from the site of the Baltimore's Washington Monument (completed in 1829), which further enhanced its value.

Robert and Mary lived in their row house for ten years during which time Robert was first President of the Valley Rail Road, a short line on the Shenandoah Valley Rail Road managed by the B & O and then promoted to third Vice President of the B & O. After the death of John Work Garrett, Robert Garrett became president of the B & O in 1884. Prompted by their growing business and social responsibilities and money, the Garretts decided to enlarge their home to create a fitting place to entertain the important people who were guests of the president of the B & O, including other railroad presidents, bankers, and state and national legislators.

Robert Garrett attended to the neighborhood as well as the house, enhancing the setting of his home by engaging Fredrick Olmstead to design the four parks of the square. Additionally, he commissioned sculptor W.W. Story, who had just created a sculpture of George Peabody for the people of London where Peabody enjoyed public acclaim, to make a copy of that sculpture to be placed in front of the Peabody Institute. Inspired by the Champs del Elysees in Paris, Garrett wanted a similar park in front of his own home. Henri Cremier designed the fountain that graces that space.

Robert and Mary Garrett then engaged Gilded Age architect Stanford White of architectural firm McKim, Mead and White to help them realize their vision of a beautiful home that would compare with other Gilded Age homes in Boston, New York, and Philadelphia. The renovations would continue for thirty-two years until the house included over forty rooms, sixteen fireplaces, and one hundred windows.

To begin reconstruction they purchased the row house next door. They desired a new façade done in the style of New York brownstones and a new entrance that added a portico. The portico plan provoked the consternation of neighbor Henry Janes who sued to prohibit its construction, asserting that it blocked his light and air and impaired his view of the monument. While initially Janes was successful in his suit, the Garretts ultimately prevailed. On April 9, 1886, the Circuit Court of Baltimore reversed the degree, and the portico was constructed. Eventually the Janes residence would become part of the 11 Mt. Vernon property; the owners would discover they needed it for light and air for their Tiffany windows.

White's reconstruction included many essentials required by the Garretts. Mary Garrett, who took major responsibility for the project, asserted many definite ideas about design and details. She insisted on arches and columns. She required space for her Belgian tapestries and wanted a carved wood vestibule, as well as Tiffany windows, and a courtyard. All of the plans submitted by White required many revisions and discussions. Given her demands, Stanford White initiated several extraordinarily beautiful details including the spiral staircase, the entrance fireplace with inglenooks, and the hanging Venetian lamp. He also designed the family dining room in Renaissance style, featuring tapestries on the walls, elaborately carved cabinets, painted black to suggest ebony. All of the downstairs rooms opened onto a courtyard of exotic plants, a parrot, and a monkey. White both designed spaces and traveled around Europe purchasing special objects to offer his clients to enhance the designs he created. The Garretts purchased many of the pieces he suggested.

During this phase of construction, many important artisans and artists of the day provided details that embellished the magnificent space. Some of them included the famous Herter Brothers of New York, furniture and interior wood design specialists, responsible for the carved vestibule panels, decorative work, and staircase that rises from the vestibule. Tiffany provided large stained glass windows and the skylight at the top of the stairs. Gilded Age artist Thomas Dewey created large frescos on canvas for the ballroom. Other important artisans included Bartlett and Haywood of Baltimore providing decorative iron work, John Cabus designing built-in cabinets. Pasquale Aeschlimann created and laid the mosaic tiles. John Stack and Son contributed the leaded glass windows and lighting. P. Harmon Hiss of Baltimore worked on interior design and wood work. Mrs. Garrett employed Fred Steinmetz as her full-time interior decorator and furniture upholster.

As the Garretts created their home, they traveled extensively, collecting art and art objects, some strictly decorative and others utilitarian. Their rooms were always embellished with museum-quality objects of art. Robert Garrett began the collection of paintings that Mary Jacobs would later devote much attention to developing, ultimately leaving to the Baltimore Museum of Art. Shipment of their Peter Paul Rubens, “Portrait of the Duchess of Cruye,” involved much correspondence. Another first piece acquired by Robert, the Rembrandt, “Titus, The Artist’s Son,” hangs in the Baltimore Museum of Art today. In addition to the art and art objects, they purchased hundreds of pieces of china and glassware in gold or with gold trim on which to serve their guests as well as silver flatware and serving pieces suitable for the many banquets they hosted.

During this first stage of renovation, Robert Garrett became ill. The pressures of operating the railroad prompted him to resign as president of the B & O in 1887. While abroad on a trip planned to ease his nerves, his tenuous health was further hampered by the unexpected death of his beloved brother, Thomas Harrison, in a yachting accident. Garrett lived eight years in a state of precarious health before dying in 1896. During his illness, Dr. Henry Barton Jacobs, at the time a physician at Massachusetts General Hospital, was engaged as Garrett's full-time physician.

Four years after Robert Garrett's death, Dr. Jacobs, who, after Garrett's death, had joined the staff of Johns Hopkins Hospital doing clinical work, specializing in study and care of tuberculosis, proposed marriage to Mary Garrett. They were married in 1904. He shared her interest in creating a beautiful domestic space, and they soon embarked on another major stage of renovation. This time John Russell Pope, another renowned Gilded Age architect, assisted them in realizing a site for the constant entertaining that was the obligation and the pleasure of Baltimore's leading socialite. With the purchase of the next adjacent row house, Pope extended the brown-stone façade, creating a seamless line. He also created a library paneled with built-in, carved book cases where Dr. Jacobs would house his collection of rare music and medical texts. Pope also added the wide, marble Caen staircase leading to the sumptuous downstairs supper room with a space for musicians to entertain the guests. This was also the site of Christmas parties for the staff and for the newsboys of Baltimore whom Mrs. Jacobs entertained every year. Jett, David. Pope also designed a theater/ballroom space, hung with Brussels tapestries. This space served as the art gallery for a while. A beautiful pipe organ made possible many musical entertainments. The Baltimore soprano, Rosa Ponselle, sang from this stage. The courtyard was enclosed as a conservatory and became the site for a twenty-foot palm tree.

After automobiles replaced horses, the stables in the back were razed and replaced with an art gallery for the many paintings that Dr. and Mrs. Jacobs amassed. The transformation of the Stanford White drawing room and parlor into one large drawing room in 1915 marked the end of the renovations overseen by John Russell Pope. With these additions by Pope, who designed changes for ten years, the Garrett-Jacobs Mansion earned the distinction of being the only structure in the United States representing the contrasting visions and styles of these two great architects of the Gilded Age. Though the two expressed different styles, and each phase of the renovation reflected each architect's distinctive touch, the overall effect is as unified and as seamless as the brown-stone façade.

In her will Mary Jacobs offered her collection of art to the then-new Baltimore Museum of Art with the stipulation that it create a wing just for her work. John Russell Pope, who designed the Museum, also designed the wing. As he did so, he kept her collection in mind, envisioning a particular vase on a particular pedestal standing next to an appropriately themed painting. Today many of the pieces are prominently displayed in the Mary Jacobs Wing of the Baltimore Museum of Art; others are elsewhere throughout the museum. Though the collection is relatively small, it includes some especially fine pieces: a Sandro Botticelli, “Madonna Adoring the Child with Five Angels;” and according to Dr. Oliver Shell, Art Historian of the Baltimore Museum of Art, one of the best of Fanz Hals, “Dorothea Berck Wife of Joseph Coymans,” and one of the best paintings owned by the museum, Jean Baptiste Chardin, “The Player of Knucklebones.”

=== Decline ===
Mary Garrett Jacobs died in 1915 leaving the house to her husband. They had no children. At his death, in 1939, the mansion which had renovations amounting to more than $2 million was auctioned for $36,000 to William Cook who planned to use it as a funeral home. Zoning laws prohibited this. The mansion was then sold to Boumi Temple. Three of the beautiful Tiffany windows were sold; other changes were made.

Baltimore City purchased the mansion in 1958 with plans to use it for the Walters Art Gallery. These plans did not materialize. For years it sat empty, deteriorating.

=== Revival ===
In 1962, it was sold to Baltimore's Engineering Society, an organization that contributed much to Baltimore's revitalization after the Baltimore fire of 1904 that destroyed most of the downtown. In need of a new home, the Engineering Society moved into the property and rescued it. The Engineering Society has overseen restoration of this mansion since that time. The Ladies Auxiliary immediately brought in furniture and began fund raisers to make repairs. Many of the engineers contributed their own skills, time, and in-kind gifts. When the property was purchased, ice had formed on the floor of the drawing room. One of the first projects was redoing the chipped and crumbling façade. Over $6 million later, the heating has been repaired and updated, air conditioning added, the conservatory has been enclosed again after the ceiling had fallen away. The drawing room, the library, the theater, the foyer have all been refurbished. A new kitchen has been added. In 1992 the Garrett-Jacobs Endowment Fund was established as another way to draw attention to the beautiful structure and attract funding. Almost all of the rooms have now undergone major renovation.

In 1971 the Mansion was recognized by the Maryland Historic Trust; in 2007 that organization awarded grant funds for the restoration of the gold leaf in the dining room. In 2009 the Baltimore Architecture Foundation presented the Golden Griffin Award to the Engineers Club and the Garrett-Jacobs Mansion Endowment Fund for stewardship of one of Baltimore's architectural treasures.

== Present day ==
The mansion now features performance space for Concert Artists of Baltimore and the Baltimore Concert Opera Company. It is also the site of lectures, parties, and weddings, as well as home to the Engineering Society which has expanded its membership to include all professions. The famous organ, once a centerpiece of entertainment at the mansion has now been restored, renovated and renamed as the Magnani Pipe Organ in honor of its benefactors. On June 24, 2012, a performance by Michael T. Britt suggested times long past. Several organ concerts have since delighted lovers of organ music and beautiful mansions since its reinstallation.

== Sources ==
=== About the people and the house ===
- Baltimore Its History and Its People Volume II. Lewis Historical Publishing Company, 1912.
- The Catalogue of the Mrs. H. B. Jacobs Collection. Ralph M. Chait Galleries of New York. A book/catalog listing art work donated to the Baltimore Museum of Art.
- Dehler, Katharine B. 11 West Mount Vernon Place. The Engineering Society of Baltimore for the benefit of the Restoration Fund, 1972, reprinted in 1977, 1987, 1993.
- Dehler, Katherine B. “Mt Vernon Place at the Turn of the Century: A Vignette of the Garrett Family.” Maryland Historical Magazine. 69. 3 (1974): 279.
- Dehler, Katherine B. 100 Years of Heritage and Innovation. Centennial Celebration Engineers Club Baltimore Maryland. The Engineers’ Club, 2006.
- Dr. Henry Barton and Mary Frick Jacobs Papers, Archives and Manuscripts Collections, Baltimore Museum of Art
- Robert Garrett Papers, Maryland Historical Society MS 979
- Hunter Jr., Wilbur H. Director of the Peal Museum. The Garrett Jacobs House Mt. Vernon Place Baltimore from the Historic Maryland Buildings Survey. Monograph.
- Power, Garrett. “Height Limitations on Mt. Vernon.” Maryland Historical Magazine 79. 3 (Fall 1984):197-219

Real Estate and Furnishings and Art Property 7, 9, 11, 13 West Mt. Vernon Place, Baltimore Maryland. Sam W. Pattison & Co. In Collaboration with Parke-Bernet Galleries Inc New York, New York. George Peabody Library. Call number 708.0838 J 17 Shell, Oliver on Mary Frick Jacobs Collection at the Baltimore Museum of Art presented at Garrett-Jacobs Mansion, March 17, 2013.

=== About the people: secondary sources ===
- “Churchman and Social Leader Dies.” Obituary of Dr. Henry Barton Jacoms. Baltimore Sun. December 12, 1939.

Jett, David. “I Remember…The Messenger Boys’ Christmas.” Baltimore Sun Magazine, December 12, 1955.

- “Robert Garrett.” Obituary. Baltimore Sun. July 30, 1896.
- “Mrs. Henry Barton Jacobs.” Obituary . The Baltimore Sun November 11, 1936. Dielman File at the Maryland Historical Society.

=== About Baltimore houses including the Garrett Jacobs Mansion ===
- Dehler, Katherine. The Thomas, Jencks, Gladding House: One West Mt. Vernon Place. Baltimore, Maryland: Bodine and Associates, Inc., 1968.
- Dorsey, John. Mount Vernon Place. Baltimore: Maclay & Assoc, 1983.
- Giza, Joanne and Black Catherine F. Great Baltimore Houses: An Architectural and Social History. Baltimore: Maclay and Associates Inc.: 1982. .

=== About Stewardship of Engineering Society ===
- Garret Jacobs Mansion Endowment Fund Newsletters, Publications of the Engineering Society.
- “Heritage Dinner Raises $17,000 for Supper Room, “March, 1998.
- “Restoring the Façade: Contributor List Grows.” March, 1998.
- “Addressing the Current Physical Needs of the Mansion.” August, 1998.
- “Brown Stone Stabilized.” August, 1998.
- “Mansion’s New Boiling System Nears Completion.”August, 1998.
- “Main Dining Room Receives New Carpet.” August, 1998.
- “Restoration honored by State.” Spring 2000.
- “Our New Kitchen Can Stand the Heat.” Winter 2001/2002.
- “The Friends of the Garrett-Jacobs Mansion.” Summer 2003.
- “The Engineering Society of Baltimore.” Summer 2004.
- “The Inaugural Organ Concert.” Acquisition of historic organ enable simulation of Garrett-Jacobs’ entertaining. Summer 2012.
- “Baltimore Heritage Award.” Award for completion of mansion's ballroom. Summer 2012.
