= Howard W. Gill =

Howard Gill
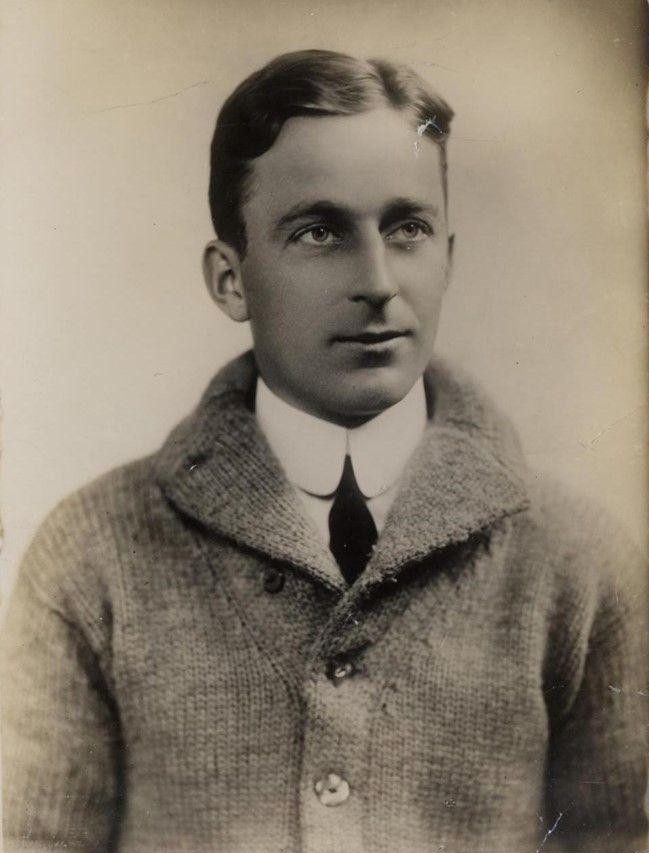
- Born: Howard Warfield Gill; 1882 (*per tombstone); Baltimore, Maryland, US
- Died: September 14, 1912; Cicero Field, Chicago, Illinois, US
- Resting place: Green Mount Cemetery, Baltimore City, Baltimore, Maryland, US
- Occupation: aviator
- Years active: 1911-12

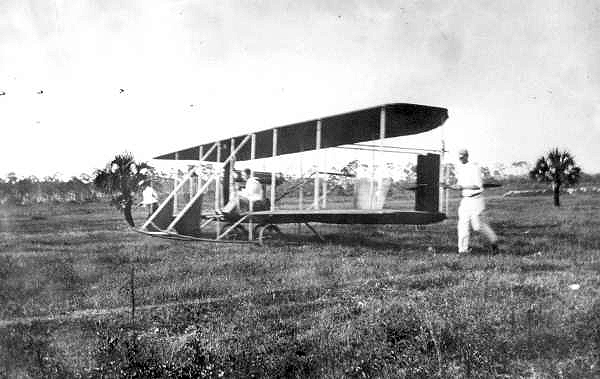
A Wright Model B flown by Gill at Miami, Florida

Howard W. Gill (1882 - September 14, 1912) was a pioneer U. S. aviator from a wealthy Baltimore tea family. He died as the result of a night time mid-air collision with fellow pilot Frenchman George Mestach during a meet at Cicero Field Chicago.

== Death ==
Gill had been in the air September 14, 1912, in a Wright Model Ex single seater, as night was coming on. He did not want to go aloft as night was coming on but promoters of the flying meet pressured him to ascend. It was the understanding of the pilots that no two airplanes were supposed to be in the air at the same time. George Mestach was told this but went up in his Morane-Borel monoplane before Gill landed. Mestach did not see that Gill had not yet landed and collided with Gill's tail rigging. The two planes crashed, in a similar fashion to the 1910 René Thomas - Bertram Dickson crash at Milan. Mestach sustained cuts and bruises but survived; Gill was mortally wounded and died before getting to the hospital. He was buried in Green Mount Cemetery in Baltimore.
