= William H. B. Fusselbaugh (politician) =

American politician (1854–1904)

Member of the Maryland House of Delegates
- In office 1894

Personal details
- Born: July 29, 1854 Baltimore, Maryland, U.S.
- Died: October 6, 1904 (aged 50) Baltimore, Maryland, U.S.
- Resting place: Green Mount Cemetery; Baltimore, Maryland, U.S.
- Party: Democratic
- Spouse(s): Alice Shaw (died) Laura J. Hickman
- Children: 3
- Occupation: Businessman; politician

William H. B. Fusselbaugh (July 29, 1854 – October 6, 1904) was a businessman and politician from Baltimore. He served in 1894 in the Maryland House of Delegates.

== Early life ==
William H. B. Fusselbaugh was born on July 29, 1854, in Baltimore to Amanda M. (née Reilly) and John S. Fusselbaugh. His father worked with Adams Express Company in Washington, D.C. Fusselbaugh attended common schools and passed an exam to attend the Baltimore City College. He apprenticed at a paper hanger for four years.

== Career ==
Fusselbaugh started a business at 422 Gay Street in Baltimore. His store room ran through 411 Ensor Street.

In 1881, Fusselbaugh was appointed as register of the seventh, eight and ninth precincts of the fourth ward. On July 16, 1885, Fusselbaugh was appointed school commissioner. He served three terms.

In 1893, Fusselbaugh was elected on a Democratic ticket to the Maryland House of Delegates. He represented the 1st legislative district of Baltimore. He served one term in 1894.

== Personal life ==
Fusselbaugh married Alice Shaw of Baltimore. They had one child, John. Fusselbaugh married Laura J. Hickman of Baltimore. They had two children, Liston P. (or Lister) and Amanda M. He was a member of the Methodist Episcopal Church. His uncle, William H. B. Fusselbaugh, was a judge in Baltimore.

Fusselbaugh died on October 6, 1904, at his home at 510 North Gay Sheet in Baltimore. He was buried at Green Mount Cemetery in Baltimore.
