= Green Mount Cemetery =

Historic rural cemetery in Baltimore City, Maryland

Coordinates: 39°18′27″N 76°36′26″W

- U.S. National Register of Historic Places
- Baltimore City Landmark
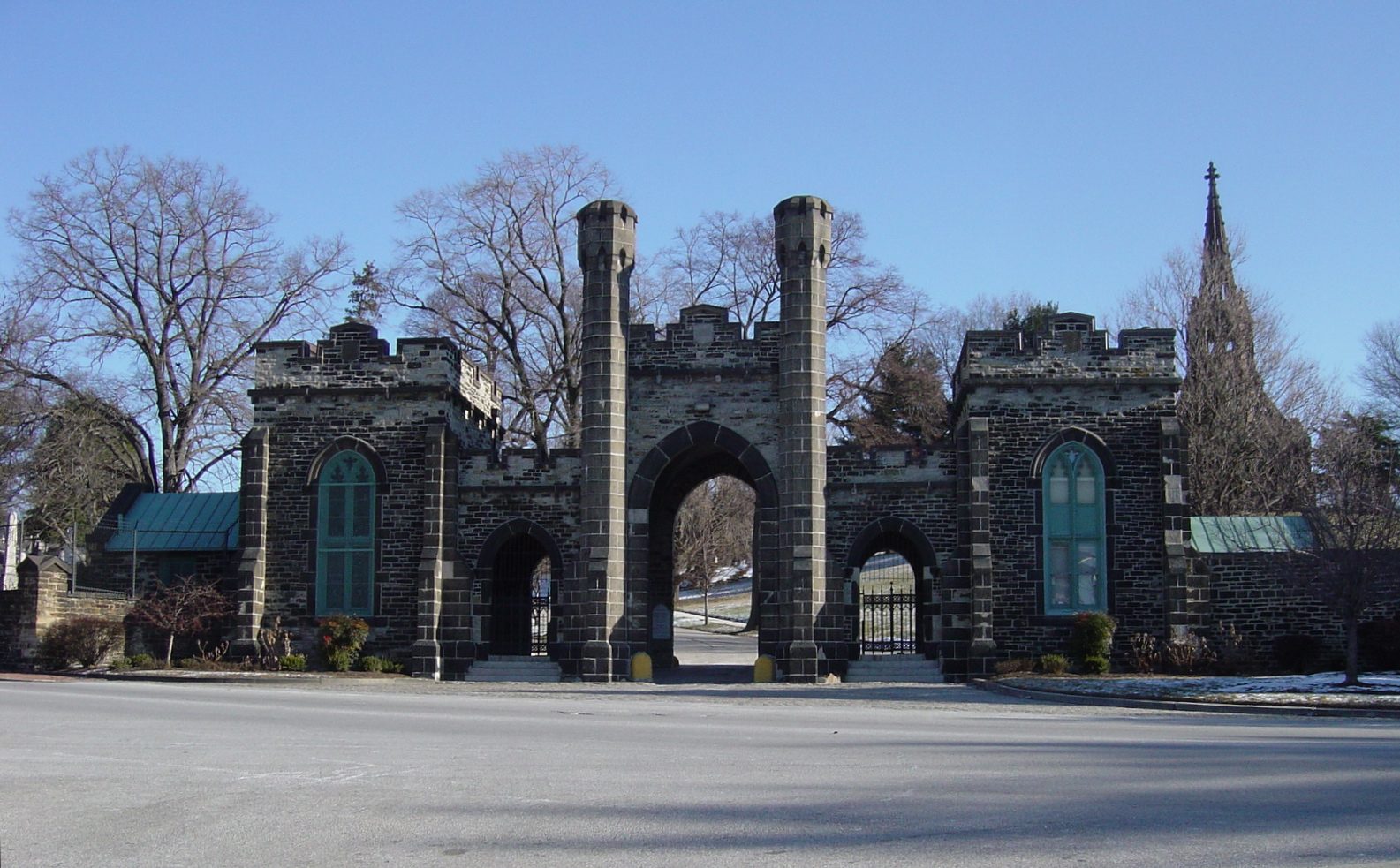
- Main Gate
- Interactive map of Green Mount Cemetery
- Location: 1501 Greenmount Avenue; Baltimore, Maryland 21202
- Built: 1839
- Architect: Robert Cary Long, Jr., et al.
- Architectural style: Mixed (multiple styles from different periods), Gothic Revival
- NRHP reference No.: 80001786

Significant dates
- Added to NRHP: April 2, 1980
- Designated BCL: 1982

Green Mount Cemetery is a historic rural cemetery in Baltimore, Maryland, United States. Established on March 15, 1838, and dedicated on July 13, 1839, it is noted for the large number of historical figures interred in its grounds as well as many prominent Baltimore-area families. It retained the name Green Mount when the land was purchased from the heirs of Baltimore merchant Robert Oliver. Green Mount is a treasury of precious works of art, including striking works by major sculptors including William H. Rinehart, Hans Schuler and Hugh Sisson.

The cemetery was listed in the National Register of Historic Places in 1980. Guided tours are available at various times of the year.

A Baltimore City Landmark plaque at the entrance reads:

Green Mount Cemetery was dedicated in 1839 on the site of the former country estate of Robert Oliver. This was at the beginning of the "rural cemetery movement"; Green Mount was Baltimore's first such rural cemetery and one of the first in the U.S. The movement began both as a response to the health hazard posed by overcrowded church graveyards, and as part of the larger Romantic movement of the mid-1800s, which glorified nature and appealed to emotions.

Green Mount reflects the romanticism of its age, not only by its very existence, but also by its buildings and sculpture. The gateway, designed by Robert Cary Long, Jr., and the hilltop chapel, designed by J. Rudolph Niernsee and J. Crawford Neilson, are Gothic Revival, a romantic style recalling medieval buildings remote in time.

Nearly 65,000 people are buried here, including the poet Sydney Lanier, philanthropists Johns Hopkins and Enoch Pratt, Napoleon Bonaparte's sister-in-law Betsy Patterson, John Wilkes Booth, and numerous military, political and business leaders.

In addition to John Wilkes Booth, two other conspirators in the assassination of Abraham Lincoln are buried here, Samuel Arnold and Michael O'Laughlen. It is common for visitors to the cemetery to leave pennies on the graves of the three men; the one-cent coin features the likeness of the president they successfully sought to murder.

The abdicated King Edward VIII and his wife, the Duchess of Windsor, had planned for a burial in a purchased plot in Rose Circle at Green Mount Cemetery, near where the father of the Duchess was interred. However, in 1965 an agreement with Queen Elizabeth II allowed for the former king and duchess to be buried near other members of the British royal family in the Royal Burial Ground near Windsor Castle.

== Notable interments ==
Riggs Monument by Hans Schuler

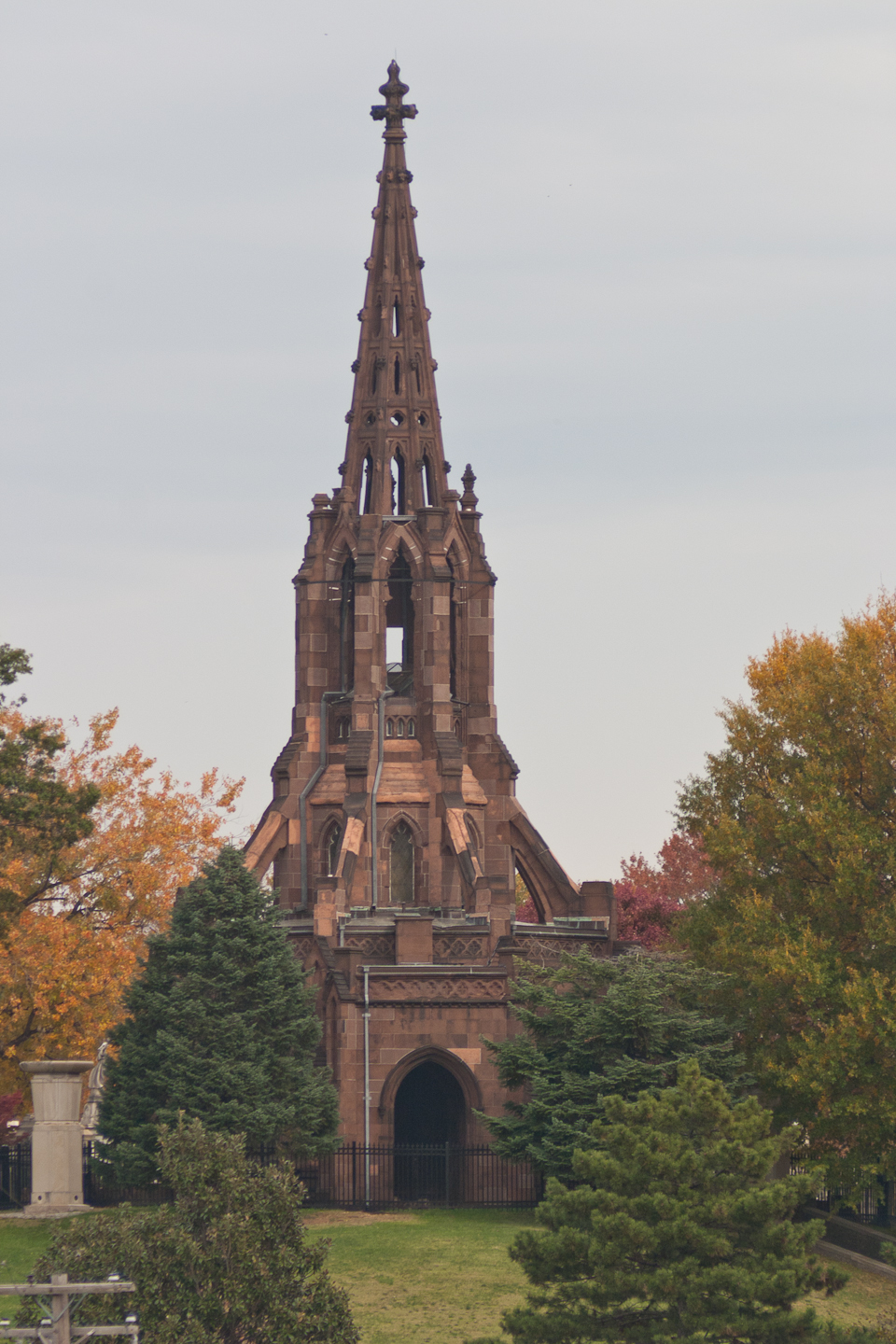
Green Mount Cemetery Chapel from the southwest

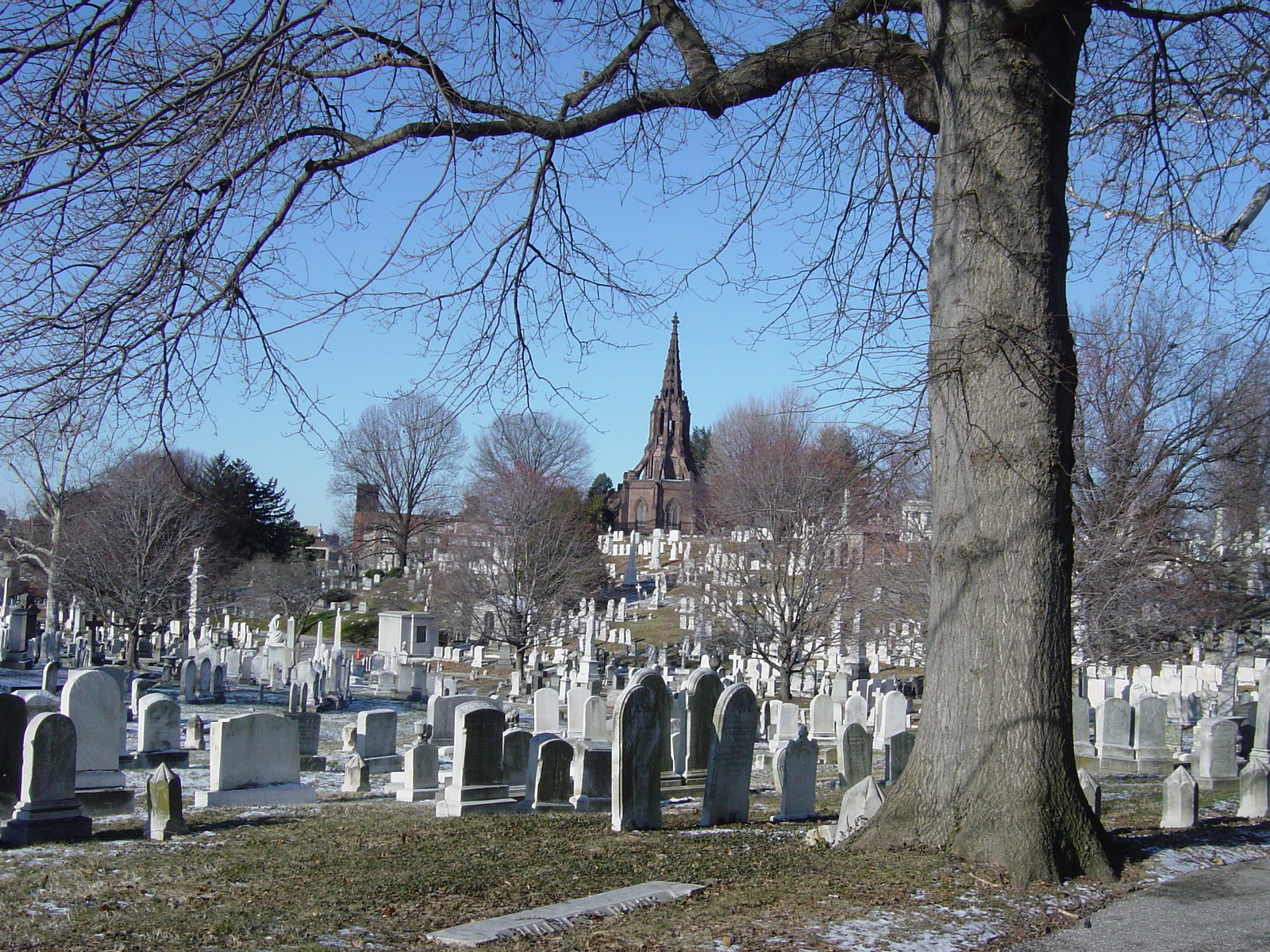
Southwest corner looking northeast

- Arunah Abell (1808–1888), journalist, newspaper publisher.
- William Julian Albert (1816–1879), U.S. Congressman.
- Edward Raymond Ames (1806–1879), American bishop of the Methodist Episcopal Church
- Richard Snowden Andrews (1830–1903), architect and Confederate States Army officer
- Harry W. Archer Jr. (1854–1910), American politician and lawyer
- Henry W. Archer (1813–1887), American politician and lawyer
- James J. Archer (1860–1921), American politician
- Samuel Arnold (1834–1906), Lincoln assassination conspirator.
- James Bankhead (1783–1856), U. S. Army General that served in the War of 1812, Second Seminole War, and Mexican–American War.
- Robert T. Banks (1822–1901), Mayor of Baltimore
- John Barney (1785–1857), U.S. representative from Maryland
- Daniel Moreau Barringer (1806–1873), a United States Congressman and diplomat.
- James Lawrence Bartol (1813–1887), American jurist
- Eric Bergland (1844–1918), U.S. and Union Army officer
- Joseph Colt Bloodgood (1867–1935), American surgeon
- A. Aubrey Bodine (1906–1970), photographer.
- Elizabeth ("Betsy") Patterson Bonaparte (1785–1879), Baltimore-born wife of Napoleon's brother, Jérôme Bonaparte.
- Carroll Bond (1873–1943), jurist.
- Elijah Bond (1847–1921), lawyer and inventor.
- Hugh Lennox Bond (1828–1893), judge
- Asia Frigga (Booth) Clarke, (1835–1888), author and sister of John Wilkes Booth.
- John Wilkes Booth (1838–1865), assassin of President Abraham Lincoln.
- Junius Brutus Booth (1796–1852), English actor.
- Augustus Bradford (1806–1881), Governor of Maryland.
- Joseph Lancaster Brent (1826–1905) lawyer and politician in California, Louisiana and Maryland, and general in the Confederate army.
- Jesse D. Bright (1812–1875), United States Senator from Indiana.
- Nathan C. Brooks (1809–1898), American educator, historian and poet
- Walter B. Brooks (1823–1896), Baltimore businessman and Republican nominee for governor of Maryland
- Frank Brown (1846–1920), Governor of Maryland
- George William Brown (1812–1890), Mayor of Baltimore
- John S. Brown (died 1878), member of the Maryland House of Delegates
- Stub Brown (1870–1948), American baseball pitcher
- Edward Nathaniel Brush (1852–1933), psychiatrist and superintendent of the Sheppard and Enoch Pratt Hospital
- William Shepard Bryan (1827–1906), judge of the Maryland Court of Appeals
- William Shepard Bryan Jr. (1859–1914), Attorney General of Maryland
- James M. Buchanan (1803–1876), judge and United States Ambassador to Denmark.
- James Buck (1808–1865), American Civil War Medal of Honor recipient.
- William Buck (died 1890), baseball player and umpire
- John Archibald Campbell (1811–1889), United States Supreme Court Justice.
- Russell Kelso Carter (1849–1928), American Protestant minister and writer
- Lyman R. Casey (1837–1914), U.S. senator from North Dakota
- Richard Caton (1763–1845), merchant and real estate developer
- John Lee Chapman (1811–1880), Mayor of Baltimore, glass maker, railroad executive.
- Charles Manning Child (1869–1954), zoologist
- George Colton (1817–1898), member of the Maryland House of Delegates
- Albert Constable (1805–1855), member of the U.S. House of Representatives
- Henry Winter Davis (1817–1865), U.S. Congressman for Maryland's 3rd District, 1863–65.
- William Daniel, state legislator and Prohibition Party vice presidential candidate, 1884.
- James Monroe Deems (died 1901), composer and music educator
- Allen Welsh Dulles (1893–1969), director of the Central Intelligence Agency and a member of the Warren Commission.
- Thomas Dunn (1925–2008), musician and conductor.
- Wendell E. Dunn (1894–1965), educator and principal of Forest Park High School.
- Wendell E. Dunn Jr. (1922–2007), metallurgist and chemical engineer.
- Johnny Eck (1911–1991), American freak show performer born without legs.
- Aaron Marshall Elliott (1844–1910), American novelist and educator
- Arnold Elzey (1816–1871), Confederate Civil War general.
- George F. Emmons (1811–1884), Rear Admiral, United States Navy.
- D. Hopper Emory (1841–1916), Maryland state senator
- George Hyde Fallon (1902–1980), U.S. Congressman, 4th District of Maryland.
- Henry D. Farnandis (1817–1900), Maryland state politician and lawyer.
- Charles W. Field (1857–1917), Maryland state delegate.
- John Van Lear Findlay (1839–1907), U.S. representative from Maryland
- Elizabeth Gault Fisher (1909–2000), entomologist, bacteriologist, and bryologist.
- Richard Fuller (1804–1876), minister and founder of the Southern Baptist movement.
- Emma Maddox Funck (1853–1940), suffragist
- William H.B. Fusselbaugh, member of the Maryland House of Delegates
- Charles D. Gaither (1860–1947), U.S. Army officer, Baltimore police commissioner, member of the Maryland House of Delegates
- George Riggs Gaither Jr. (1858–1921), Attorney General of Maryland
- John W. Garrett (1820–1884), president of the Baltimore and Ohio Railroad
- John W. Garrett (1872–1942), ambassador to Italy, Luxembourg, the Netherlands, Argentina, and Venezuela
- Mary Garrett (1854–1915), suffragist and philanthropist
- Robert Garrett (1875–1961), athlete and Olympic medallist
- William F. Giles (1807–1879), U.S. representative from Maryland and U.S. district judge
- George M. Gill (1803–1887), lawyer
- Howard W. Gill (1882–1912), wealthy aviator
- John Sterett Gittings (1798-1879) and grandson John Sterett Gittings (1848-1926), bankers, politicians, commissioners
- Charles J. M. Gwinn (1822–1894), state delegate and Attorney General of Maryland
- Elvina M. Hall (1820–1889), songwriter
- James Hall (1802–1889), founder of Maryland-in-Africa
- Robert G. Harper (1765–1825), United States Senator from Maryland.
- John C. Herbert (1776–1846), Virginia and Maryland state politician and U.S. representative from Maryland
- Solomon Hillen Jr. (1810–1873), Mayor of Baltimore, U.S. Representative from Maryland, member of the Maryland House of Delegates
- Johns Hopkins (1795–1873), businessman and philanthropist. His bequests helped found the Johns Hopkins University and Johns Hopkins Hospital.
- Benjamin Chew Howard (1791–1872), a congressman and reporter of decisions of the United States Supreme Court
- Benjamin Huger (1805–1877), a career United States Army ordnance officer and a Confederate general in the American Civil War.
- Jesse Hunt (1793–1872), mayor of Baltimore.
- Obed Hussey (1792–1860), inventor and rival of Cyrus McCormick.
- Henry Barton Jacobs (1858–1939), physician and educator
- Mary Frick Garrett Jacobs (1851–1936), socialite and art collector
- Eugene P. Jacobson (1841–1881), Civil War Medal of Honor recipient
- John Hanson Thomas Jerome (1816–1863), Mayor of Baltimore
- Reverdy Johnson (1796–1876), statesman, United States Senator and United States Attorney General.
- Joseph Eggleston Johnston (1807–1891), military officer in the Confederate States Army.
- Isaac Dashiell Jones (1806–1893), U.S. Congressman
- John Reese Kenly (1818–1891), Union Army general
- Anthony Kennedy (1810–1892), United States Senator.
- John P. Kennedy (1795–1870), congressman and United States Secretary of the Navy.
- William Keyser (1835–1904), executive of the Baltimore and Ohio Railroad
- Harriet Lane (1830–1903), niece of President James Buchanan, acted as First Lady of the United States from 1857 to 1861.
- Sidney Lanier (1842–1881), musician and poet.
- Benjamin Henry Latrobe, Jr. (1806–1878), civil engineer and Green Mount's landscape architect.
- Ferdinand Claiborne Latrobe (1833–1911), Mayor of Baltimore and speaker of the Maryland House of Delegates
- John H. B. Latrobe (1803–1891), lawyer and inventor.
- James O. Law (1809–1847), Mayor of Baltimore and merchant.
- James Fenner Lee (1843–1898), member of the Maryland Senate
- John Carroll LeGrand (1814–1861), speaker of the Maryland House of Delegates and Maryland supreme court judge
- Henry Symes Lehr (1869–1929), socialite
- Lewis Henry Little (1817–1862), Confederate brigadier general
- Walter Lord (1917–2002), author, best known for his book on the sinking of the RMS Titanic, A Night to Remember.
- John Gresham Machen (1881–1937), Presbyterian theologian and founder of Westminster Theological Seminary in Philadelphia, Pennsylvania.
- John MacTavish (1787–1852), British Consul to Maryland in the 1840s.
- Etta Haynie Maddox (1860–1933), singer, lawyer, and suffragist
- William M. Maloy (1874–1949), member of the Maryland House of Delegates and Maryland Senate, candidate for Maryland governor
- Charles Marshall (1830–1902), colonel in the Confederate States Army, aide de camp, assistant adjutant general, and military secretary for the Army of Northern Virginia and Gen. Robert E. Lee.
- Arthur Pendleton Mason (1835–1893), Confederate officer
- Charles F. Mayer (1826–1904), president of Baltimore and Ohio Railroad
- Theodore R. McKeldin (1900–1974), Mayor of Baltimore and Governor of Maryland.
- Alexander McKim (1748–1832), U.S. representative from Maryland
- Leonora Jackson McKim (1879–1969), violinist
- Randolph Harrison McKim (1842–1920), Episcopal clergy and writer
- Louis McLane (1786–1857), United States Congressman from Delaware, United States Secretary of the Treasury, and later the United States Secretary of State.
- Louis McLane (1819–1905), financier
- Robert McLane (1867–1904), Mayor of Baltimore
- Robert Milligan McLane (1815–1898), Governor of Maryland.
- Louis Wardlaw Miles (1873–1944), World War I Medal of Honor Recipient.
- J. Maxwell Miller (1877–1933), sculptor
- Lyttleton Morgan (1813–1895), namesake of Morgan State University
- Susan Rigby Dallam Morgan (1810–1887), writer and poet
- Norman T.A. Munder (1867–1953), printer and typographer
- Arthur C. Needles (1867–1936), president of the Norfolk and Western Railroad.
- John Nelson (1794–1860), United States Attorney General.
- Benjamin Franklin Newcomer (1827–1901), railroad executive and bank president.
- Harry W. Nice (1877–1941), Governor of Maryland.
- Daniel S. Norton (1829–1870), United States Senator from Minnesota.
- Marcia Croker Noyes (1869–1946), librarian
- Michael O'Laughlen (1840–1867), Lincoln assassination conspirator.
- R. G. Harper Pennington (1854–1920), artist and writer
- Edward Coote Pinkney (1802–1828), poet.
- Walter de Curzon Poultney (1845–1929), socialite and art collector
- John Prentiss Poe (1836–1909), Attorney General of Maryland, 1891–95.
- Enoch Pratt (1808–1896), businessman and philanthropist, founder of Baltimore's public library system and co-founder of the Sheppard Pratt Hospital.
- James H. Preston (1860–1938), 35th Mayor of Baltimore.
- James R. Price (1862–1929), sports journalist and executive.
- James F. Purvis (died 1880), slave trader and banker
- Isaac Freeman Rasin (1833–1907), Baltimore politician and political boss
- Lawrason Riggs (1861–1940), businessman and civic leader
- Thomas Riggs Jr. (1873–1945), governor of Alaska Territory
- William Henry Rinehart (1825–1874), sculptor.
- Cadwalader Ringgold (1802–1867), U.S. Navy officer.
- Samuel Ringgold (1796–1846), U.S. Army officer in the Mexican–American War
- Albert C. Ritchie (1876–1936), Governor of Maryland, 1920–35.
- John A. Robb (1792–1867), shipbuilder
- Harry W. Rusk (1852–1926), U.S. representative from Maryland
- Molly Elliot Seawell (1860–1916), historian and writer
- Frank Sellman (1851–1907), American baseball player
- Moses Sheppard (1771–1857), businessman and philanthropist
- Winford Henry Smith (1877–1961), physician.
- William Wallace Spence (1815–1915), financier.
- John G. Sproston (1828–1862), Union naval officer
- Isaac Nevett Steele (1809–1891), lawyer and diplomat
- George H. Steuart (1790–1867), a United States Army general in the War of 1812.
- George H. Steuart (1828–1903), Confederate Civil War general.
- John A. Stevens (died 1916), playwright and actor
- Marvin Stone (1842–1899), inventor of the drinking straw
- George C. Stouffer (1822–1873), American ship captain
- Thomas Swann (1809–1883), Governor of Maryland, 1866–69, U.S. Congressman for Maryland's 3rd and 4th Districts, 1869–79, Mayor of Baltimore, 1856–60.
- Joseph Pembroke Thom (1828–1899), member of the Maryland House of Delegates, military officer in the Mexican–American War and Confederate States Army.
- John Lewis Thomas Jr. (1835–1893), U.S. representative from Maryland
- Mary Spear Tiernan (1835–1891), writer
- Henry Alfred Todd (1854–1925), philologist and writer
- Isaac R. Trimble (1802–1888), U.S. Army officer, civil engineer, railroad construction superintendent and executive, and a Confederate general in the Civil War.
- Francese Litchfield Turnbull (1844–1927), novelist
- Daniel Turner (1794–1850), United States Navy officer during the War of 1812.
- Erastus B. Tyler (1822–1891), Union Army general in the American Civil War.
- Martha Ellicott Tyson (1795–1873), Quaker elder, author, and co-founder of Swarthmore College
- John B. Van Meter (1842–1930) U.S. Navy chaplain, academic, and co-founder of Goucher College
- Joshua Van Sant (1803–1884), Mayor of Baltimore
- John Carroll Walsh (1816–1894), state senator
- Henry Walters (1848–1931), president of the Atlantic Coast Line Railroad, art collector whose bequest to the City of Baltimore in 1931 started the Walters Art Museum.
- William Thompson Walters (1820–1894), liquor distributor, banker, railroad magnate and art collector.
- Severn Teackle Wallis (1816–1894), lawyer and state politician
- Teackle Wallis Warfield (1869–1896), father of Wallis Simpson, Duchess of Windsor and wife of the former king Edward VIII, the Duke of Windsor.
- John Frederick Weishampel Jr. (1832–1904), printer and publisher
- John Wethered (1809–1888), U.S. Representative
- William Pinkney Whyte (1824–1908), Maryland State Delegate, State Comptroller, a United States Senator, the State Governor, the Mayor of Baltimore, and Attorney General of Maryland.
- John Whitridge Williams (1866–1931), obstetrician and writer
- Joseph Pere Bell Wilmer (1812–1878), Episcopal bishop of Louisiana.
- Celeste Revillon Winans (1823–1861), philanthropist
- Ross Winans (1796–1877), inventor, mechanic, and member of the Maryland House of Delegates
- Ross Revillon Winans (1850–1912), Gilded Age heir and socialite
- Thomas DeKay Winans (1820–1878), engineer and entrepreneur
- John H. Winder (1800–1865), Confederate general during the Civil War.
- George D. Wise (1816–1881), Union Army officer

== See also ==
- List of burial places of justices of the Supreme Court of the United States
