= Mary Spear Tiernan =

American writer (1835–1891)

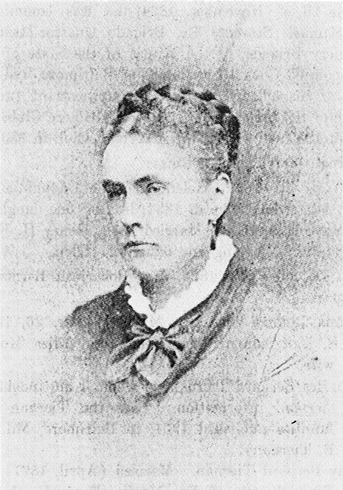
- Born: Mary Spear Nicolas; February 14, 1835; Baltimore, Maryland, U.S.
- Died: January 13, 1891 (aged 55); Baltimore
- Resting place: Green Mount Cemetery
- Occupation: writer
- Spouse: Charles B. Tiernan (m. 1873)
- Writing career
- Notable works: Homoselle; Sousette; Jack Horner

Mary Spear Tiernan (née, Nicholas; February 14, 1835 - January 13, 1891) was a 19th-century American writer. Her earliest contributions to literature appeared in Bledsoe's The Southern Review. She was also a contributor to The Century Magazine and Harper's Magazine. Tiernan published three novels: Homoselle, Sousette and Jack Horner, 1890.

== Biography ==
Mary Spear Nicholas was born in Baltimore, Maryland, February 14, 1835. (Note: According to the Encyclopedia Virginia, Mary's year of birth was 1836.) She was the daughter of Elizabeth Byrd Ambler and Robert Carter Nichols. Her great-grandfather was Robert Carter Nicholas Sr., the last treasurer of the Colony of Virginia.

Much of Tiernan's early life was spent in Richmond, Virginia, which is depicted in her novels, Homoselle, Suzette, and Jack Horner. Her earliest contributions to literature appeared in Bledsoe's "Southern Review." Her first novel, Homoselle, was the most popular and successful of the "Round Robin Series." Encouraged with the reception with which her first novel had met, Tiernan entered upon an active career, writing for The Century, Harper's Magazine, and The Southern Review and publishing two additional novels, Sousette and Jack Horner, 1890; the last of these included a second edition. Her literary work was often the most interesting part of the programs of the Eight O'Clock Club, and the Woman's Literary Club, of which she was one of the founders.

On July 23, 1873, she married Charles B. Tiernan, of Baltimore. She died of pneumonia on January 13, 1891, in Baltimore, and was buried in Green Mount Cemetery.

== Selected works ==
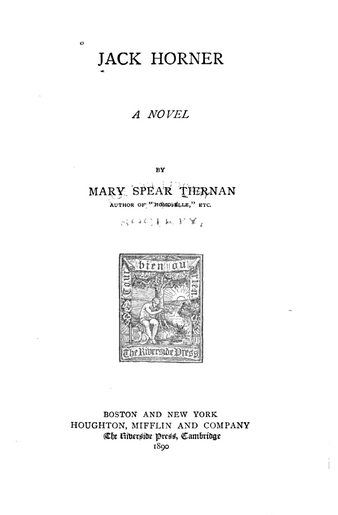
Jack Horner

- Homoselle: a Virginia Novel (1881)
- Suzette: A Novel (1885)
- Jack Horner: A Novel (1890)
