= Henry Barton Jacobs =

American physician and educator (1858–1939)

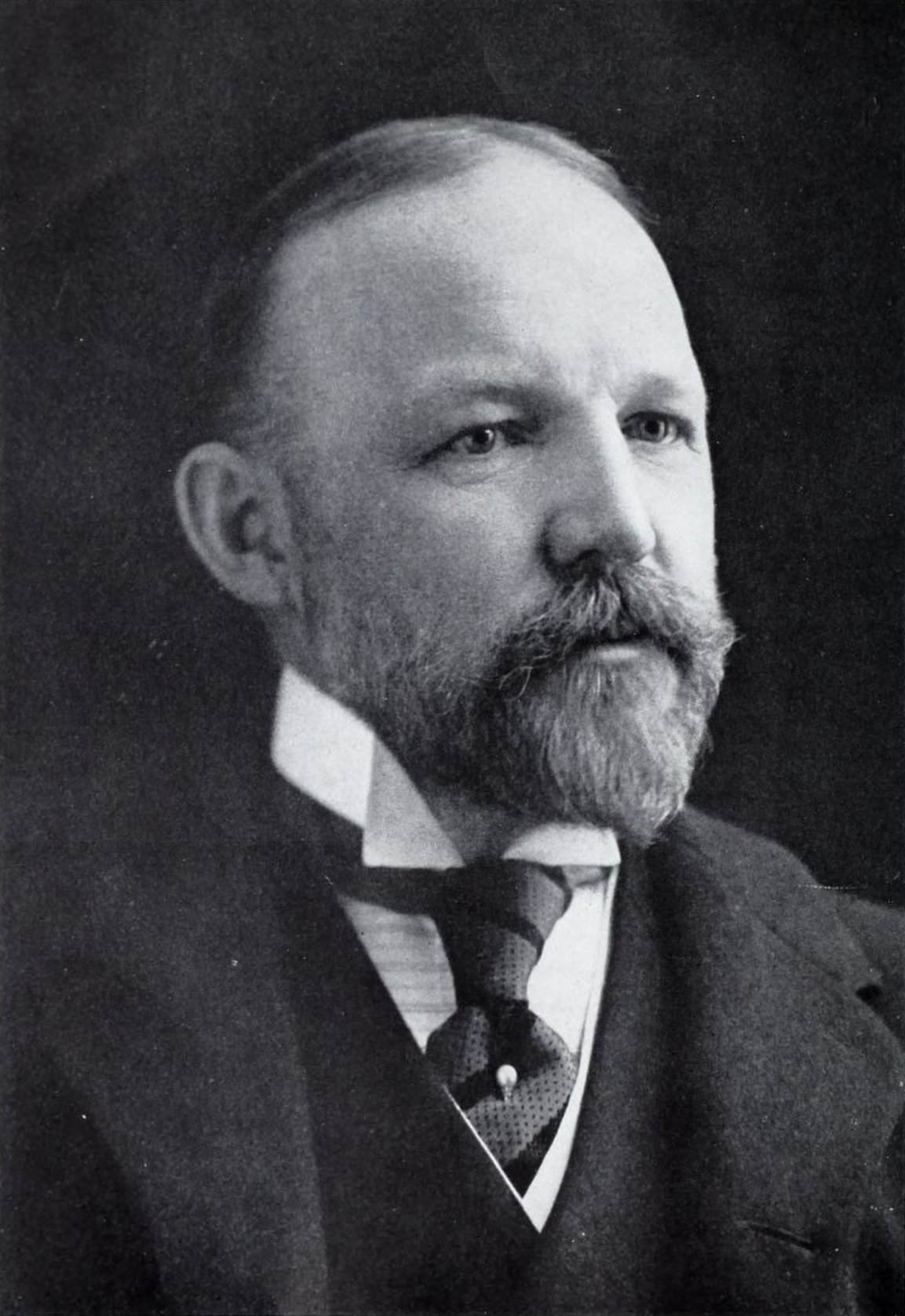
- Jacobs in 1914 publication
- Born: June 2, 1858; South Scituate, Massachusetts, U.S.
- Died: December 18, 1939 (aged 81); Baltimore, Maryland, U.S.
- Resting place: Green Mount Cemetery; Baltimore, Maryland, U.S.
- Education: Harvard University (BA); Harvard Medical School (MD)
- Occupations: Physician; educator
- Spouse: Mary Frick Garrett (m. 1902; died 1936)

Henry Barton Jacobs (June 2, 1858 – December 18, 1939) was a physician and educator from Maryland. He taught at Johns Hopkins University and served as a trustee of Johns Hopkins Hospital and Peabody Institute later in life. He married Mary Frick Garrett, art collector and widow of a Baltimore and Ohio Railroad president.

== Early life ==
Henry Barton Jacobs was born on June 2, 1858, in South Scituate, Massachusetts, to Frances Almira (née Ford) and Richmond Jacobs. He studied at Hingham High School in Hingham. Jacobs graduated from Harvard University in 1883 with a Bachelor of Arts and graduated from Harvard Medical School in 1887 with a Doctor of Medicine. He worked as an assistant in botany at Harvard from 1884 to 1885. He was a direct descendant of Peregrine White and William Cushing. He interned at Massachusetts General Hospital in Boston under Reginald H. Fitz from 1887 to 1888.

== Career ==
Jacobs left Massachusetts General Hospital in spring of 1888. He then became a physician at the Boston Dispensary and started a general medical practice at 8 Hancock Street in Boston. Jacobs became the private physician of Robert Garrett, president of the Baltimore and Ohio Railroad, in August 1888. He lived in Ringwood, New Jersey, in the winter of 1888 and afterward moved to Baltimore, Maryland. He became an associate of medicine at Johns Hopkins University in 1896 and taught classes at the medical school at Johns Hopkins in its early years. After the departure of William Osler to Oxford, Jacobs retired from Johns Hopkins in 1905.

Jacobs served as consulting physician and president of the Hospital for Consumptives of Maryland from 1896 to 1901. He was a member of the board of managers of the Maryland State Tuberculosis. He was secretary of the National Association for Prevention of Tuberculosis from 1904 to 1920. He also served as director. Jacobs was a member of the International Association for Prevention of Tuberculosis.

Jacobs wrote "Some Distinguished American Students of Tuberculosis" and articles on hygiene. In 1911, Jacobs was elected as a trustee of Johns Hopkins Hospital. He also served as a trustee of Peabody Institute. He was a fellow of the American Association for the Advancement of Science. Jacobs served as vice president of the Baltimore Museum of Art and became president in June 1936. He was member of the executive committee of the Baltimore Society of the Friends of Art. Jacobs was a collector of medical portraiture. He was president of the Johns Hopkins Medical Historical Society. He was a member of the Medical Historical Society of Paris and was an associate editor of the Annals of Medical History.

Jacobs spent summer months of his life in Newport, Rhode Island, starting in 1890. He served on the executive committee of the Newport Art Society. He served as president of the Spouting Rock Beach Association. He also served as secretary and treasurer. Jacobs was president of the Redwood Library from 1931 to 1939 and governor of the Newport Casino. He was also vice president of the Newport Improvement Association. He was one of the first members of the board of managers of the Seamen's Church Institute of Newport.

== Personal life ==
Jacobs married the widow of Robert Garrett, Mary Frick Garrett on April 2, 1902, at Grace and St. Peter's Protestant Episcopal Church. His wife died on October 20, 1936.

Jacobs lived at Garrett Jacobs Mansion, 11 West Mount Vernon Place in Baltimore. He was friends and neighbors with William Osler. Jacobs had a villa in Newport, Rhode Island. The home was named "Whiteholme" and was designed by John Russell Pope.

Jacobs remained active with the Grace and St. Peter's Protestant Episcopal Church. He was a vestryman for 40 years. He was first vestryman of Trinity Church in Newport.

Jacobs died following a heart attack on December 18, 1939, at his mansion in Baltimore. He was buried at Green Mount Cemetery in Baltimore.

== Legacy ==
Jacobs donated his collection of medical books, medallions, engravings and a room to house the collection to Johns Hopkins University in 1932. It also included a collection of writings of René Laennec.
