= Joshua Van Sant =

American politician (1803–1884)

Joshua Vansant
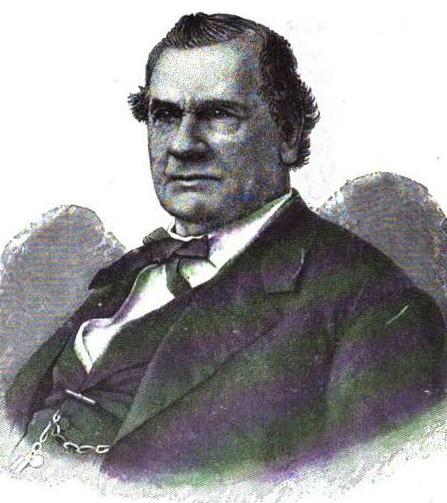
- posthumous portrait c. 1895

25th Mayor of Baltimore
- In office November 6, 1871 – November 1, 1875
- Preceded by: Robert T. Banks
- Succeeded by: Ferdinand C. Latrobe

3rd Comptroller of Baltimore
- In office July 17, 1876 – April 8, 1884
- Preceded by: Samuel S. Mills Jr. (Acting)
- Succeeded by: James R. Horner

Personal details
- Born: December 31, 1803 Millington, Maryland, U.S.
- Died: April 8, 1884 (aged 80) Baltimore, Maryland, U.S.
- Party: Democratic
- Profession: Politician

Joshua Vansant (December 31, 1803 – April 8, 1884) was a United States Congressional representative from Maryland. He served as mayor of Baltimore from 1871 to 1875.

== Background ==
Vansant was born in Millington in Kent County, Maryland. He moved with his parents to Wilmington, Delaware, in 1807, and later to Philadelphia in 1812. He attended the common schools before moving to Baltimore, Maryland.

== Career ==
He engaged in hat making in 1817, became a journeyman, and continued that trade until 1835. He was an unsuccessful candidate as a Jackson Democrat (supporting seventh President Andrew Jackson) to the lower chamber Maryland House of Delegates of the General Assembly of Maryland in 1833 and 1834, but served as a delegate to the State constitutional convention (version unratified) in 1836. He also served as U.S. Postmaster of Baltimore from 1839 to 1841, served again as a member of the House of Delegates in 1845, and as commissioner of Baltimore finances from March 1, 1846 to March 1, 1855. He was a trustee of the city and county almshouse (poor house municipal charity) from 1847 to 1853 and in 1861. He also served as a commissioner of public schools from 1852 to 1854, and later as president of that city Board of School Commissioners for the Baltimore City Public Schools in 1854. He was mentioned as the President of the (Baltimore) Institute of Music in 1856 (see "The Sun" The Baltimore Sun daily newspaper - 25 November 1856).

Vansant was elected as a Democrat to the Thirty-third Congress, where he served from March 4, 1853, to March 3, 1855. He was an unsuccessful candidate for reelection to the Thirty-fourth Congress in 1854. He later served as a presidential elector on the Democratic ticket of John C. Breckinridge in pivotal crucial Presidential Election of 1860 which led up to the American Civil War (1861-1865), and was delegate to the State constitutional convention in 1867 which created the fourth version and current state constitution. He was director of the Maryland State Penitentiary (founded 1806) from 1867 to 1869, serving two years as president. He was member of the board of trustees of the McDonough Educational Fund and Institute (for the modern McDonough School) from 1867 to 1871, serving as president in 1871, and member and president of the board for Bay View Asylum (later renamed Baltimore City Hospitals, then Francis Scott Key Medical Center, and today as Johns Hopkins Bayview) from 1868 to 1870.

Vansant served as mayor of Baltimore from 1871 to 1875, during which time the current Baltimore City Hall massive construction project 1867-1875, was completed under budget and dedicated. He later declined to be a candidate for renomination. He was appointed City Comptroller of Baltimore in July 1876 and served until his death, in 1884, in Baltimore. He was interred in Greenmount Cemetery off of Greenmount Avenue and East North Avenue in northeast Baltimore.

U.S. House of Representatives
Preceded by Edward Hammond	Member of the U.S. House of Representatives from Maryland's 3rd congressional district 1853–1855	Succeeded by James Morrison Harris
Political offices
Preceded by Robert T. Banks	Mayor of Baltimore; 1871–1875	Succeeded by Ferdinand Claiborne Latrobe
