= George C. Stouffer =

American ship captain (1822–1873)

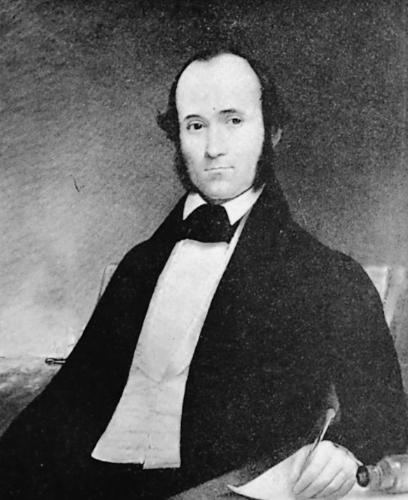
- Portrait of Stouffer, c. 1855
- Born: George Close Stouffer; April 22, 1822; Baltimore, Maryland, U.S.
- Died: May 6, 1873 (aged 51); Brooklyn, New York, U.S.
- Resting place: Green Mount Cemetery; Baltimore, Maryland, U.S.
- Occupations: Ship captain; mariner
- Spouse: Margaret Stauffer
- Children: 2
- Awards: Congressional Gold Medal

George Close Stouffer (April 22, 1822 – May 6, 1873) was an American ship captain. In July 1866, Stouffer was awarded the Congressional Gold Medal by President Andrew Johnson for "gallant conduct" rescuing approximately 500 Americans (some of whom were U.S. Army soldiers) from the wreck of the steamship San Francisco.

== Early life and family ==
George Close Stouffer was born on April 22, 1822, in Baltimore, Maryland. He was married to Margaret Stauffer and they had two children.

== Career ==
In 1850, Stouffer became captain of the ship Antarctic based in New York. Stouffer was an approved officer in the merchant service, having received a commission from the American Shipmasters' Association. He was a longtime citizen of Baltimore. After service on the Antarctica, Stouffer commanded the ships Trimountain, Polar Star, and William Tapscott.

=== Rescue efforts ===
In ate December 1853, the steamship San Francisco encountered a storm off the Atlantic seaboard that rendered the ship disabled and in jeopardy of sinking. Over the course of the next week, Captain Stouffer and the Antarctic, along with two other ships, saved three-quarters of the passengers and crew onboard the San Francisco. The heroic efforts of Stouffer and the other ship captains received wide coverage in the United States and around the world, and Congressman Charles O’Neill compiled a report regarding the rescue on behalf of the House Commerce Committee.

== Death ==
Stouffer died on May 6, 1873, at his home on Raymond Street in Brooklyn. He was buried at Green Mount Cemetery in Baltimore.

== Awards and honors ==
In 1854, the Maryland General Assembly passed a resolution honoring Stouffer and his efforts. Stouffer was also honored by the city of New York, received the City of Philadelphia Medal for Gallantry, received a medal from the Royal Humane Society, and gifted with a ceremonial watch from the Merchant's Exchange of New York.

After the rescue, the crew of the San Francisco commissioned a portrait in Stouffer's honor.

On July 26, 1866, thirteen years after the rescue, President Andrew Johnson signed legislation into law awarding Stouffer a payment of $7,500 along with the Congressional Gold Medal with special distinction as the Congressional Live-Saving Medal.

=== Legacy ===
In 1860, the U.S. Congress passed legislation renaming the steamboat Antelope to the steamboat George C. Stouffer, a rare distinction for an individual to receive while still alive.

An 1854 daguerreotype of Stouffer is on display at the Free Library of Philadelphia. An 1854 James E. Buttersworth painting commemorating the rescue efforts entitled The Ships Antarctic of New York, Capt Stouffer, and Three Bells of Glasgow, Capt Creighton rescuing the passengers and Crew from the Wreck of the Steam Ship "San Francisco." is in the collection of the MIT Museum.
