= Bill Spence =

Bill Spence may refer to:

- Bill Spence (footballer) (1929–1993), English footballer
- Bill Spence (musician) (1940–2019), American hammered dulcimer player
- Bill Spence (racing driver) (1906–1929), American racecar driver
- Bill Spence (writer) (1923–2024), English writer

== See also ==
- Billy Spence (died 1980), Northern Ireland activist
- William Spence (disambiguation)
