= Grace Denio Litchfield =

American novelist, poet

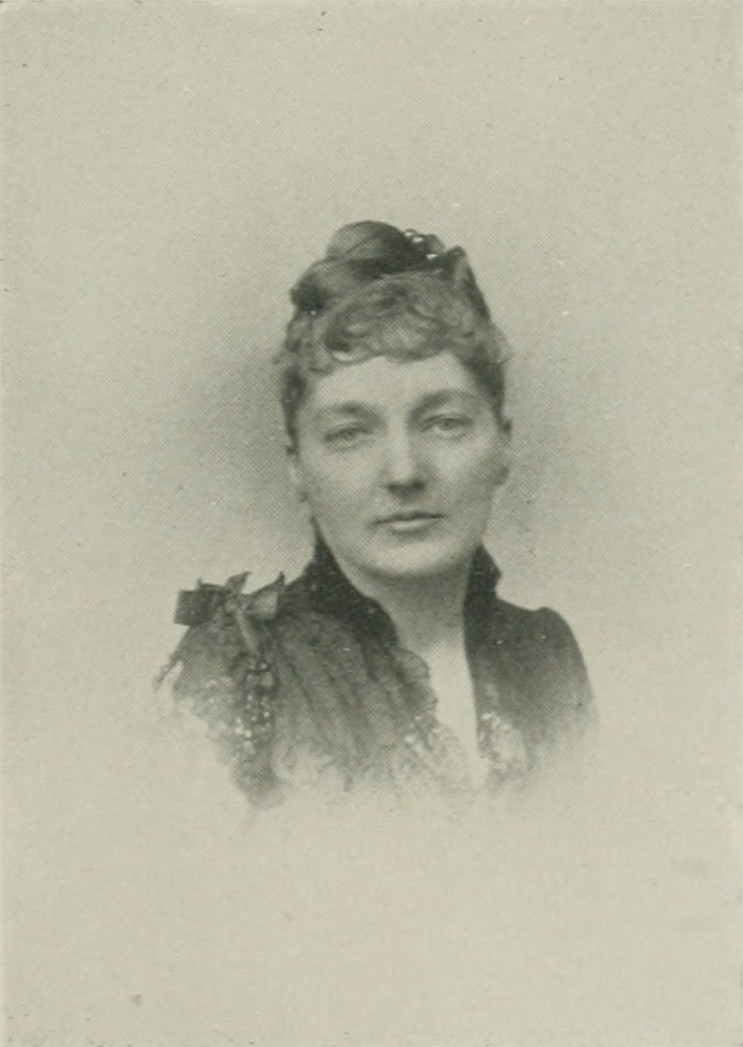
- "A Woman of the Century"
- Born: November 19, 1849; Brooklyn Heights, Brooklyn, New York, U.S.
- Died: December 4, 1944 (aged 95); Goshen, New York, U.S.
- Occupations: Poet, novelist
- Writing career
- Language: English

Grace Denio Litchfield (November 19, 1849 – December 4, 1944) was an American poet and novelist.

== Early years and education ==
Grace Denio Litchfield was born in Brooklyn Heights in New York City on November 19, 1849. She was the youngest daughter of Grace Hill Litchfield and Edwin Litchfield, an attorney. Litchfield's sister, Francese Hubbard Litchfield Turnbull, was the author of Val Maria and several other books and was also the longtime president of the Woman's Literary Club of Baltimore, into which Litchfield was inducted as an honorary member in 1890.

== Career ==
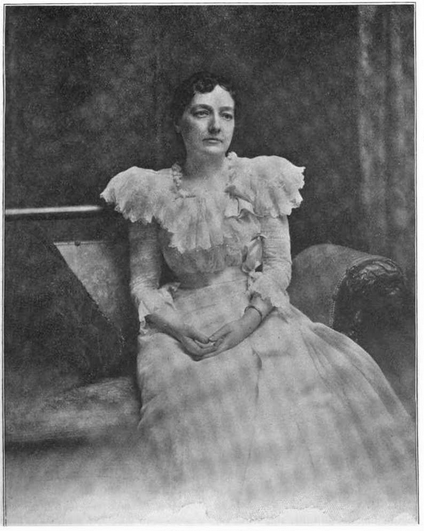
Grace Denio Litchfield

Starting when she was a child, and despite ill health, Litchfield wrote almost constantly. She did not begin to publish until she was in her late-thirties. From that point on she published numerous works of poetry, fiction, and drama in newspapers and magazines including Harper's, Century, The Atlantic, St. Nicholas, The Wide Awake, and the New York Independent.

Litchfield published her first novel, Only an Incident, in 1883. Over the next thirty years, she published eight novels with major publishing firms including G.P. Putnam's Sons, Dodd Mead, and Little, Brown.

Litchfield was in Mentone, on the Italian Riviera, when that portion of Italy was visited by the earthquake of February 23, 1887, and narrowly escaped death under the falling walls of her residence. Her account of the earthquake on the Riviera, In the Crucible, was published in 1897.

Litchfield also published works in dramatic verse, including Vita (1904) and Nun of Kent (1911).

== Personal life ==
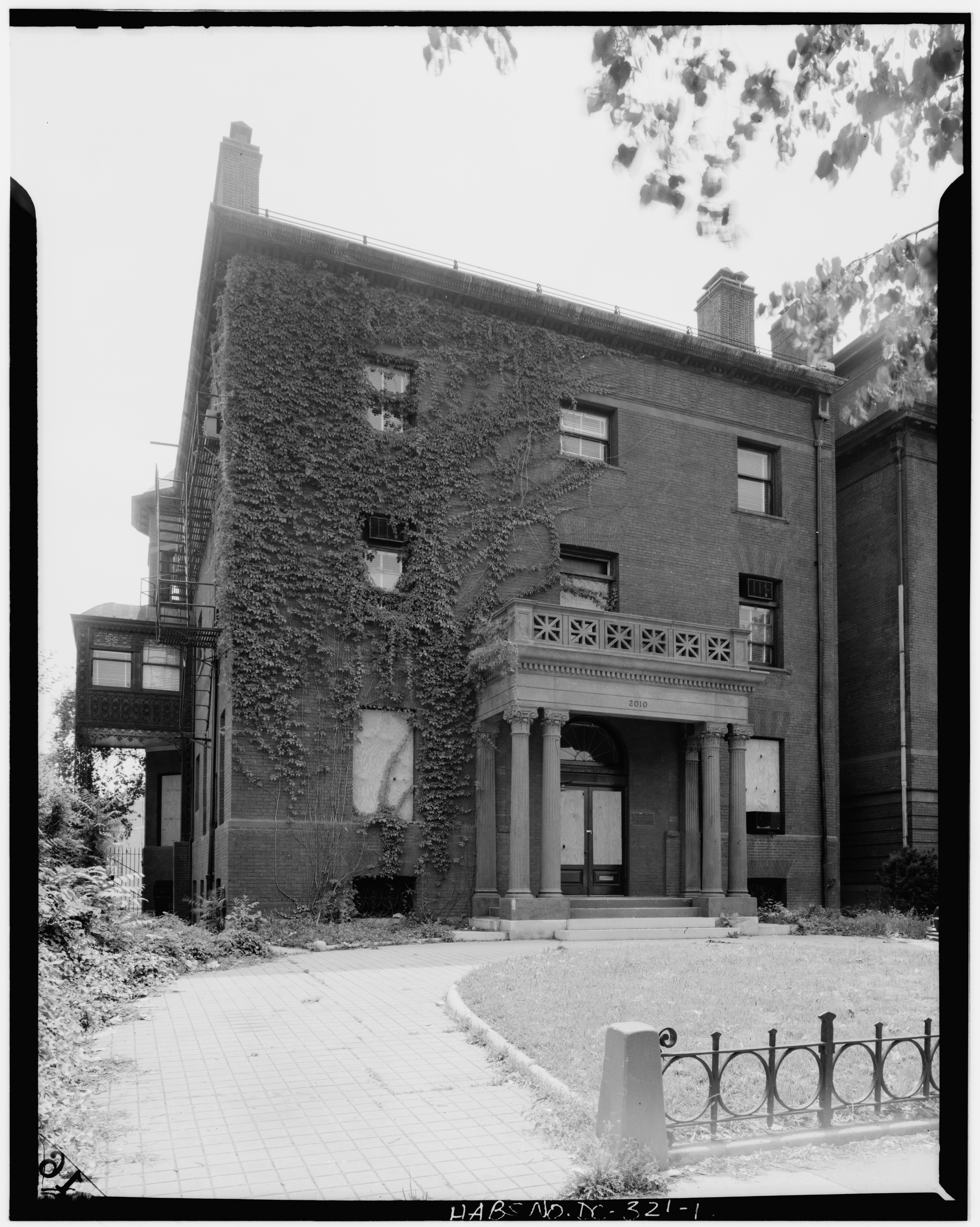
Grace Denio Litchfield house, Washington D.C.

Litchfield's spent much of her early life alternating between her childhood home in Brooklyn Heights and living abroad in Europe. Beginning in 1888, she made her home in Washington, D. C., where she built a house on 2010 Massachusetts Avenue NW, where she lived for the next fifty years. She also kept a summer home on Central New York's Lake Minnewaska. Litchfield died in Goshen, New York on December 4, 1944.

== Selected works ==
- Only an Incident (1883)
- Criss-Cross (1885)
- The Knight of the Black Forest (1885)
- A Hard-won Victory (1888)
- Little Venice and Other Stories (1890)
- Little He and She (1893)
- Mimosa Leaves: Poems (1895)
- In the Crucible (1897)
- The Moving Finger Writes (1900)
- Vita: a Drama (1904)
- The Letter D (1904)
- The Supreme Gift (1908)
- Baldur the Beautiful (1910)
- The Nun of Kent: a Drama in Five Acts (1911)
- Collected Poems (1913)
- The Song of the Sirens (1917)
- As a Man Sows and Other Stories (1926)
