= Robert T. Banks =

American politician (1822–1901)

Robert Tunstall Burks
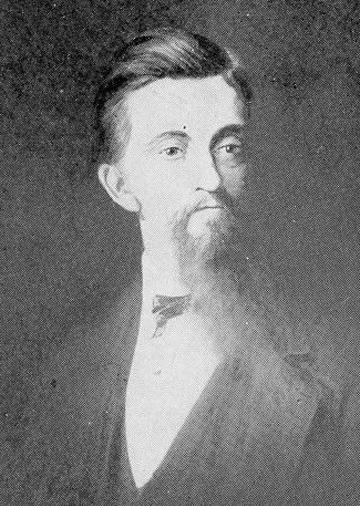
- Banks ca. 1871

24th Mayor of Baltimore
- In office November 4, 1867 – November 6, 1871
- Preceded by: John L. Chapman
- Succeeded by: Joshua Van Sant

Personal details
- Born: April 2, 1822 Williamsburg, Virginia, U.S.
- Died: August 8, 1901 (aged 79) Baltimore, Maryland, U.S.
- Resting place: Green Mount Cemetery; Baltimore, Maryland, U.S.
- Party: Democratic
- Spouse: Mary B. Loane (m. 1845; died 1899)
- Children: 3
- Occupation: Politician; businessman

Robert Tunstall Banks (April 2, 1822 – August 8, 1901) was Mayor of Baltimore from 1867 to 1871.

== Early life ==
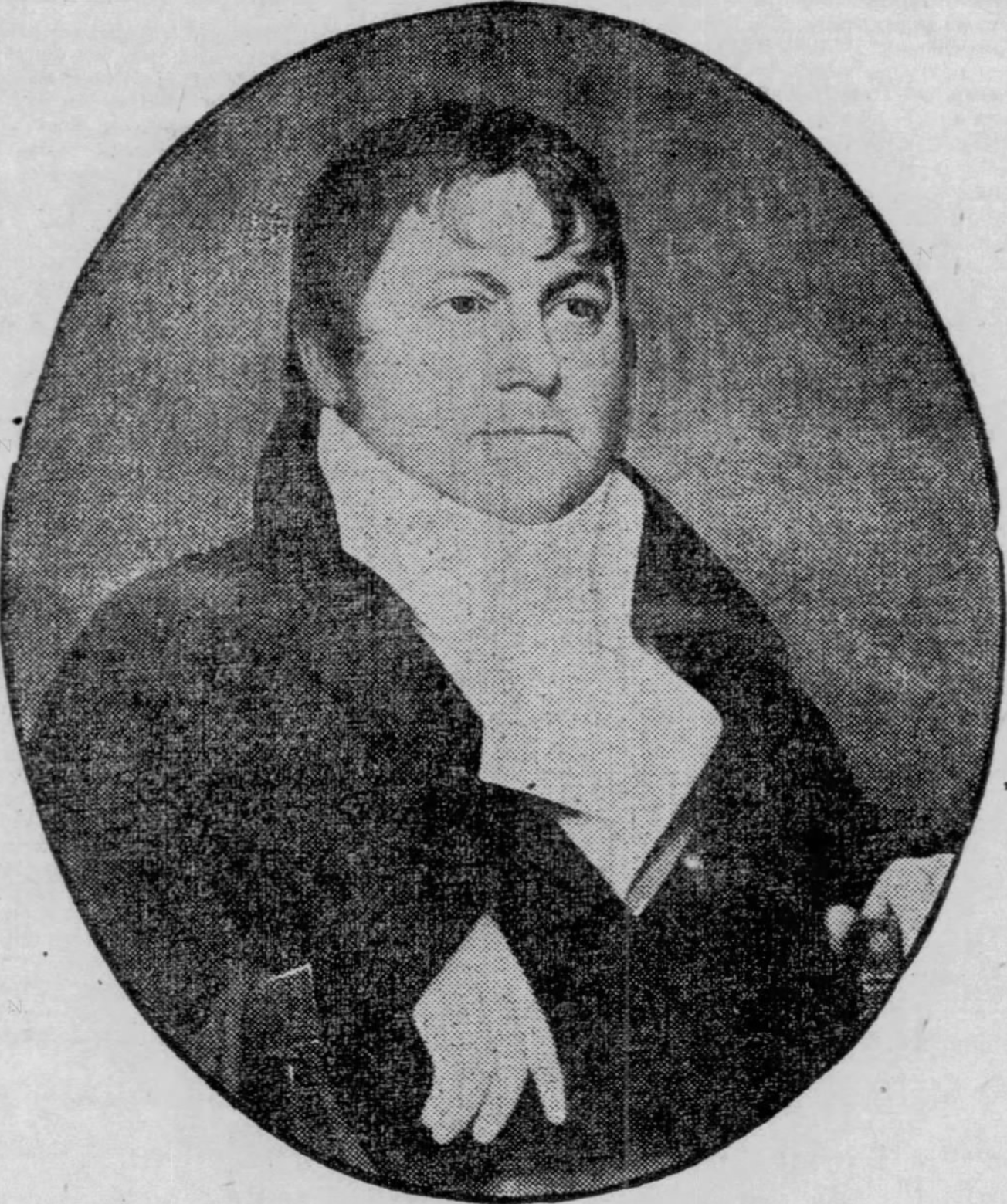
George Washington Banks, father of Robert T. Banks

Robert Tunstall Banks was born on April 2, 1822, in Williamsburg, Virginia to Charlotte Hayward (née Martin) and George Washington Banks. His father was a lawyer in Virginia and served as a major in the 6th Virginia Regiment. Banks was educated in common schools. After his father death in 1835, Banks was taken into the office of Thomas Ritchie, founder of the Richmond Enquirer. At the age of fifteen, his family moved to Baltimore and he worked as a clerk at a post office there.

== Career ==
Banks was a Democrat. Banks served as Mayor of Baltimore for one term, from November 4, 1867, to November 6, 1871. During his administration, considerable cobblestone street paving happened throughout the city and the first asphalt was laid on South Street. During this period, the Baltimore City Hall construction continued and loans were established for the Valley Road of Virginia and the Western Maryland Railway. The first black people were able to vote during his administration. He was the first mayor elected after the Maryland Constitution of 1867 took effect, changing the term of service to four years. However, the law changed again in 1870, changing the length of service back to two years.

Banks served as register of wills for Baltimore from 1881 to 1892. He was also the founder of a wholesale crockery business called Robert T. Banks & Sons.

== Personal life ==
Banks married Mary B. Loane, of Baltimore, in 1845. She died in December 1899. They had three children: Mrs. Hugh Sutherland, Harry R. and William E.

Banks died on August 8, 1901, at his home at 803 North Calvert Street in Baltimore. He was interred at Green Mount Cemetery in Baltimore.

Political offices
Preceded by John L. Chapman	Mayor of Baltimore; 1867–1871	Succeeded by Joshua Van Sant
