= Francese Litchfield Turnbull =

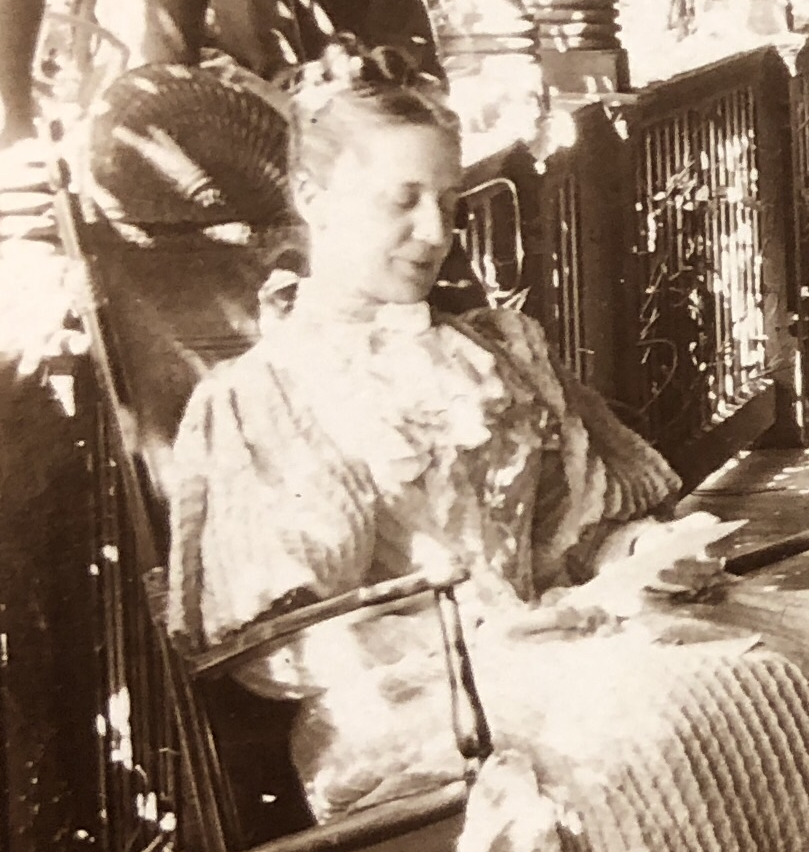
- Born: Frances Hubbard Litchfield; May 23, 1844
- Died: February 28, 1927
- Resting place: Green Mount Cemetery
- Children: Grace Turnbull, Edwin Litchfield Turnbull, Eleanor L. Turnbull
- Parents: Edwin Clark Litchfield (father); Grace Hill Litchfield (mother)
- Relatives: Grace Denio Litchfield

Francese Hubbard Litchfield Turnbull (May 23, 1844 – February 28, 1927) was an American novelist. A longtime president of the Woman's Literary Club of Baltimore, she was a patron and admirer of the poet Sidney Lanier.

== Early life ==
Francese Hubbard Litchfield was born in Utica, New York, the daughter of Edwin Clark Litchfield and Grace Hill Hubbard. Edwin Litchfield was a New York railroad and real estate developer who owned large parts of what is today the Park Slope neighborhood of New York City and built a mansion in what is now Prospect Park named for his wife, Grace Hill. Her sister was the novelist and poet Grace Denio Litchfield.

On January 24, 1871, she married lawyer and publisher Lawrence Turnbull. The Turnbulls lived in Baltimore, Maryland and owned an estate near Towson, Maryland called La Paix that F. Scott Fitzgerald later rented in 1932. Turnbull published several historical novels under the name Mrs. Lawrence Turnbull.

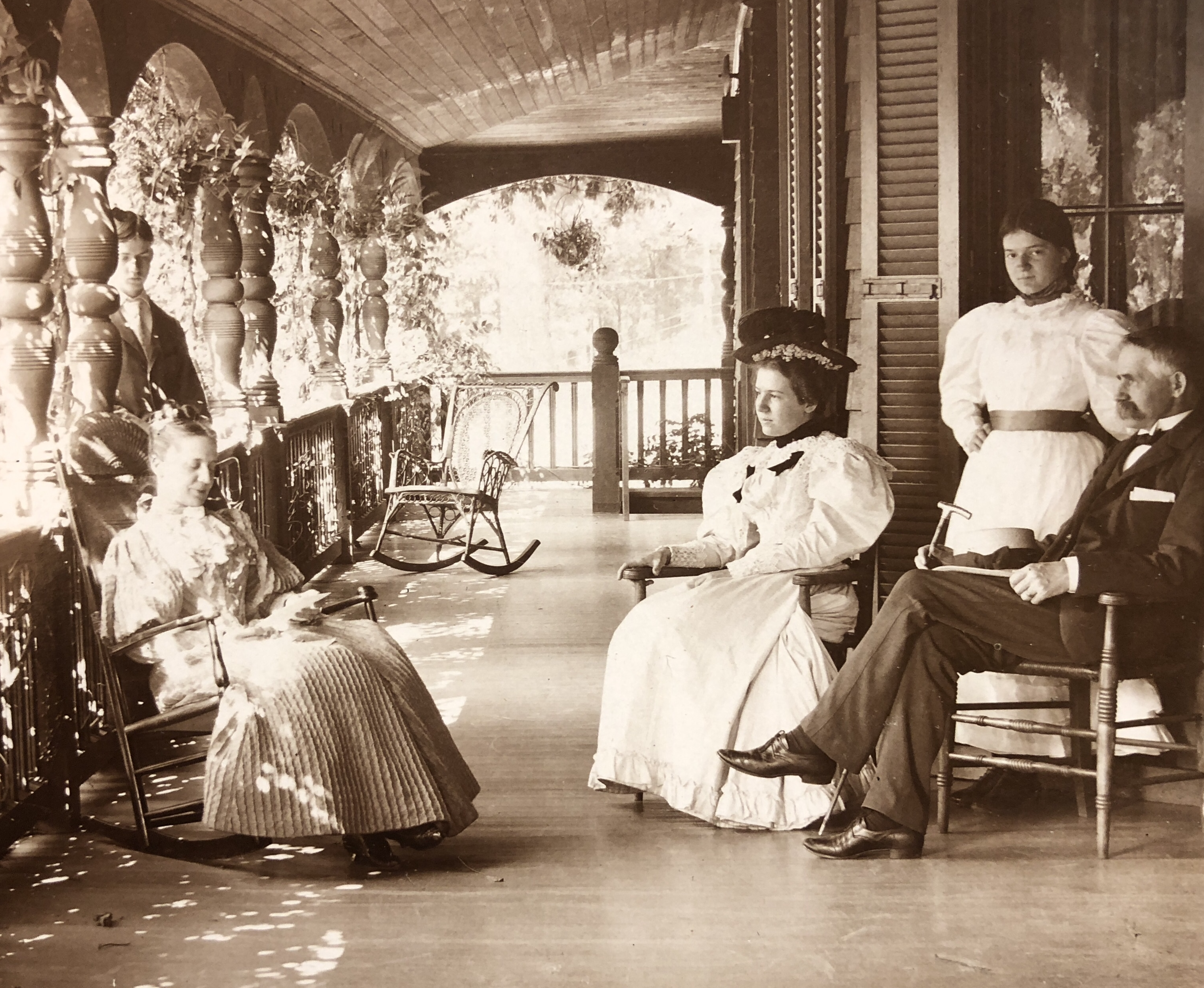
Francese Litchfield Turnbull with her family (her husband Lawrence is opposite her ) at La Paix

The Turnbulls' long association and support of Sidney Lanier dates to around 1870, due to Lawrence Turnbull's admiration for the poem "Nirvana". They were likely the impetus for Lanier's move to Baltimore. Aubrey Starke writes of Francese Turnbull:

In Baltimore [...] the Laniers were now often with Mr. Turnbull and his poetic, music-loving wife, whose romantic idealization of Lanier has stamped itself unmistakably on Lanier's character as it appears through the aura of the Lanier legend, but who must be remembered as a real benefactor of Lanier's Baltimore days.

Their support for Lanier continued after his 1881 death, as they assisted his widow and four children and even buried Lanier in the Turnbull plot in Green Mount Cemetery.

Francese Turnbull's essay "A Study of Sidney Lanier" was published in Douglas Sladen's Younger American Poets, 1830-1890 (1891) and she wrote a novel, The Catholic Man (1890), whose protagonist Paul is a fictionalized version of Lanier.

In 1890, Turnbull was the founding president of the Woman's Literary Club of Baltimore and was re-elected president seven times.

Francese Litchfield Turnbull died on February 28, 1927. She was buried in Green Mount Cemetery.

== Family ==
Francese and Lawrence Turnbull had five children:

- Edwin Litchfield Turnbull (1872–1927) - a musician and conductor who helped create the Baltimore Symphony Orchestra.
- Eleanor Laurelle Turnbull (1875–1964) - a poet and translator who translated the poems of Gabriela Mistra, Pedro Salinas, Miguel de Unamuno, and others.
- Percy Graeme Turnbull (May 28, 1878–February 12, 1887), was showing signs of substantial literary gifts at the time of his unexpected death at 8 years old. The Turnbull Poetry Lectures were established in Percy's memory at Johns Hopkins University in 1891.
- Bayard Turnbull (1879–1954) - an architect
- Grace Hill Turnbull (1880–1976) - a painter and sculptor

== Bibliography ==
- The Catholic Man: A Study, 1890
- Val-Maria: a Romance of the Time of Napoleon, 1893
- The Golden Book of Venice: A Historical Romance of the Sixteenth Century, 1900
- The Royal Pawn of Venice: A Romance of Cyprus, 1911
