= Leonora Jackson McKim =

American violinist (1879–1969)

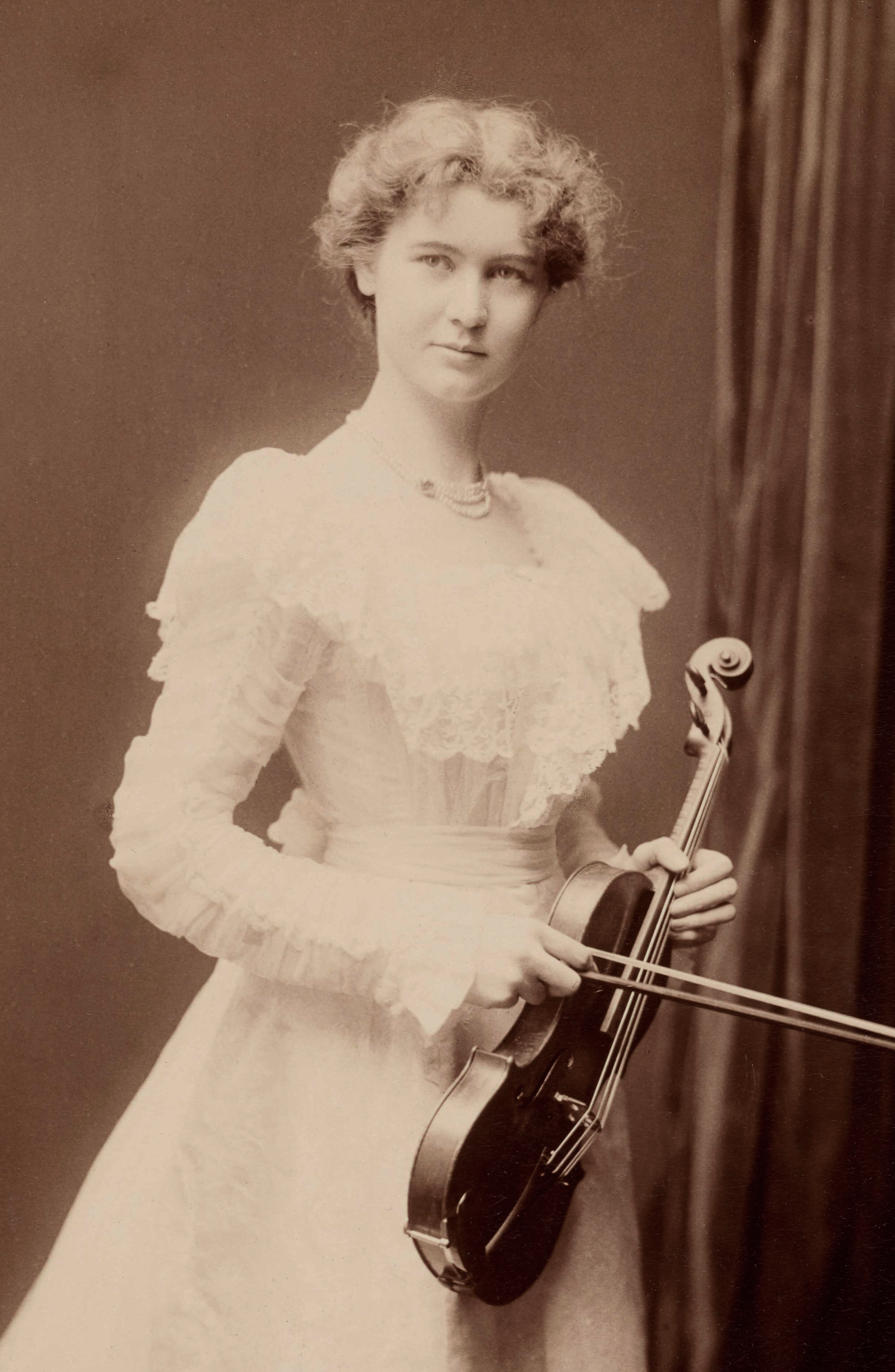
- Leonora Jackson, c. 1900 (photo by H. S. Mendelssohn)
- Born: Leonora Jackson; February 20, 1879; Boston, Massachusetts, U.S.
- Died: January 7, 1969 (aged 89); Baltimore, Maryland, U.S.
- Resting place: Green Mount Cemetery
- Occupation: Violinist

Leonora Jackson McKim (born Leonora Jackson, February 20, 1879, in Boston, Massachusetts, United States; died January 7, 1969, in Baltimore, Maryland, United States) was one of the first American women to achieve international acclaim as a concert violinist, and was credited with improving the perception of American artists in Europe: "Leonora Jackson was the first American violinist whom European opinions recognized to equal any of its great artists and who conquered all prejudice as to the supposed inferiority of American talent."

== Biography ==
Leonora Jackson McKim was born in Boston to Charles P. Jackson, a wealthy engineer, and Elisabeth Higgins, an aspiring singer. She made her debut in Berlin on October 17, 1896, with the Berlin Philharmonic. Despite her female gender, the critics acclaimed: "We have not for a long time heard a lady play the violin with such spirit and energy". She was decorated by Queen Victoria, and performed throughout Europe and the United States with leading orchestras including the London Philharmonic and the Boston Symphony. She retired from performing after her marriage in 1915 to Dr. William Duncan McKim (1855–1935). The McKims were avid supporters of the arts, holding musical programs in their home and collecting a large number of works of art, many of which were donated to the Smithsonian Institution and the Maryland Historical Society after the death of Dr. McKim.

Leonora Jackson McKim died in Baltimore, Maryland and was buried in Green Mount Cemetery in Baltimore.

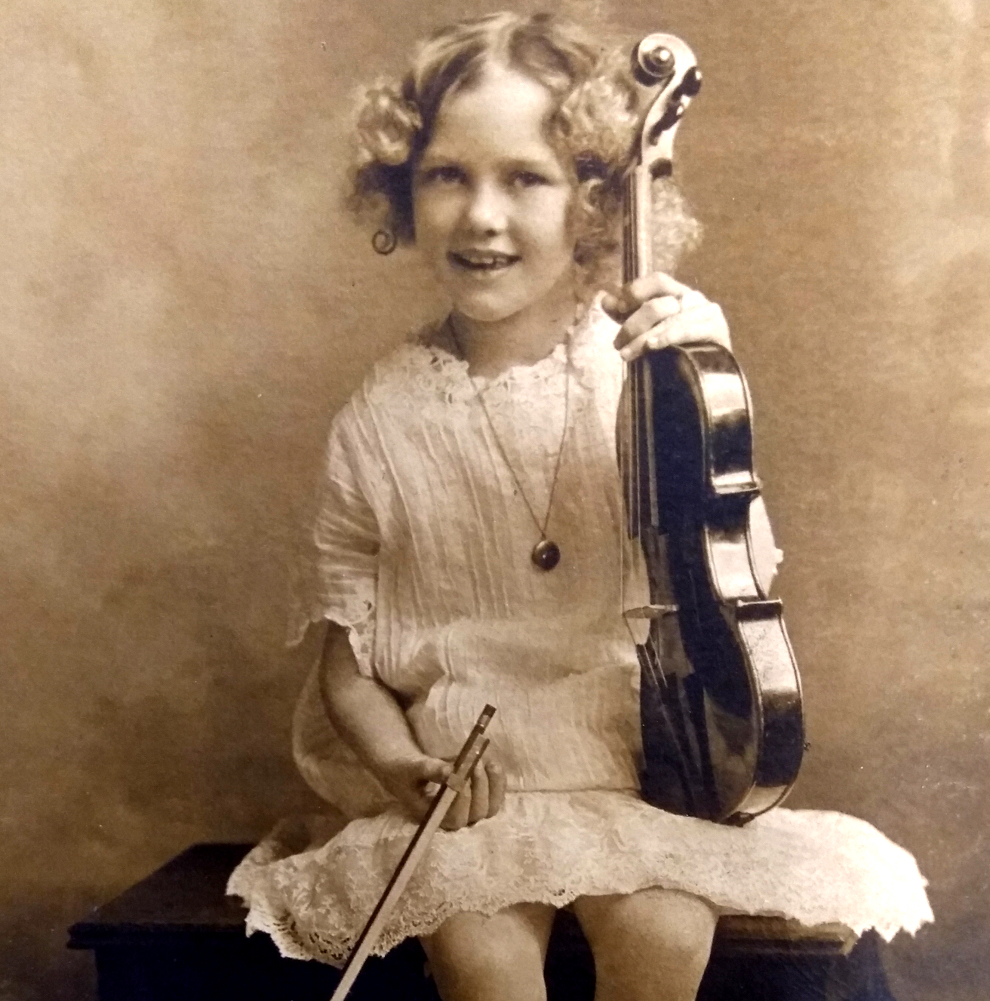
Leonora Jackson as a child in the 1880s. Photo: McKim Collection, Music Division, Library of Congress

=== Early life and violin studies ===
Leonora Jackson studied violin from age seven, beginning in Chicago with Carl Becker for four years followed by S. E. Jacobsohn of the Chicago Symphony. In 1891, she traveled to Paris to study with Léon Desjardins, Charles Dancla at the Paris Conservatoire and Carl Markees in Berlin. In 1893, Joseph Joaquim had the opportunity to listen to Jackson during a visit to the United States; he later took her on as a student at the Royal Academy of Music in Berlin.

In 1898, Jackson won the Mendelssohn Scholarship, awarded by the Leipzig Conservatory in support of foreign students, receiving a prize worth approximately $90,000 in today's dollars. This funding along with the help of her patrons, including First Lady Frances Folsom Cleveland and industrialist George Vanderbilt, allowed her to study in Chicago, Paris, and Berlin.

=== Performing career: 1896–1915 ===
On October 17, 1896, Leonora Jackson made her debut with the Berlin Philharmonic under the direction of Joseph Joachim. Once more she was acclaimed: ‘Unquestionably we have to do here with no ordinary talent […]. From the proofs both musical and technical which the young lady offered […] she is sure of a career.’ In 1898, Jackson's London debut was another great success. Afterward, she performed in various German cities, as well as in Switzerland, Belgium and Austria.

On July 17, 1899, Leonora performed before Queen Victoria and the Royal Family at Windsor Castle as a part of a tour of England. The Queen presented Leonora with a jeweled, star-shaped brooch bearing the royal monogram. She frequently wore the Victorian Star during performances, concerts, and photographs.

Leonora returned to the United States in 1900 after spending six years in Europe. In the 1900–1901 season, she performed 160 concerts; between 1900 and 1902 over 300 US performances, including eight performances as a soloist with the Boston Symphony Orchestra.

Leonora took a year-long sabbatical in 1911, living on a farm in Albany, New York as she grew weary from the constant pressures of touring.

=== Marriage to William Duncan McKim ===
In October 1915, Leonora Jackson married Dr. William Duncan McKim, a Eugenics advocate and author of "Heredity and Human Progress" 1900, and a member of a prominent Baltimore merchant family. Dr. McKim was an organist, and he had a large pipe organ and music room built in their Washington, D.C., home. Leonora and William shared a love of music, art, and traveling. After her marriage, Leonora ceased touring and performing publicly and focused instead on painting, sculpture, and writing, only performing for small charitable functions. After the passing of Dr. McKim, Leonora donated her artwork and collections to the Smithsonian Institution and the Maryland Historical Society.

== Legacy ==
=== The McKim Fund ===
After Leonora's death in 1969, the McKim Fund was established in 1970. The fund was based on the bequest of the McKim family and intended to commission new music for violin and piano. Since 1970, over 50 new works emerged as an outcome of the McKim fund. Among them are works such as Second Sonata for Violin by William Bolcom and Two^{4} for violin and piano by John Cage.

=== Leonora Jackson McKim Memorial Scholarship ===
Mrs. McKim bequeathed $30,000 to the Peabody Conservatory in Baltimore to establish a memorial award in her name. The award, established in 1969, assists a violin student in the field of composition.

=== Collections and holdings ===
The Maryland Historical Society holds three collections related to Leonora Jackson McKim – the Leonora Jackson McKim Photograph Collection, containing photographs from 1883 to 1942 with the bulk of the collection from the 1890s; the Leonora Jackson McKim Manuscript and Ephemera Collection, and the William Duncan McKim Photograph Collection. Leonora donated much of this collection in 1935, after the death of her husband.

The Music Division of the Library of Congress holds the Leonora Jackson McKim Papers consisting of correspondence, photographs, music, artwork, books, and other writings, as well as the McKim Fund Collection, which includes commissioned works, programs, and letters. Leonora Jackson donated material to the Library of Congress in 1928, 1941, and 1953, then left much of her estate to the Library in her will to fund new commissions and their performances.

=== The 'Leonora Jackson' Stradivari Violin ===
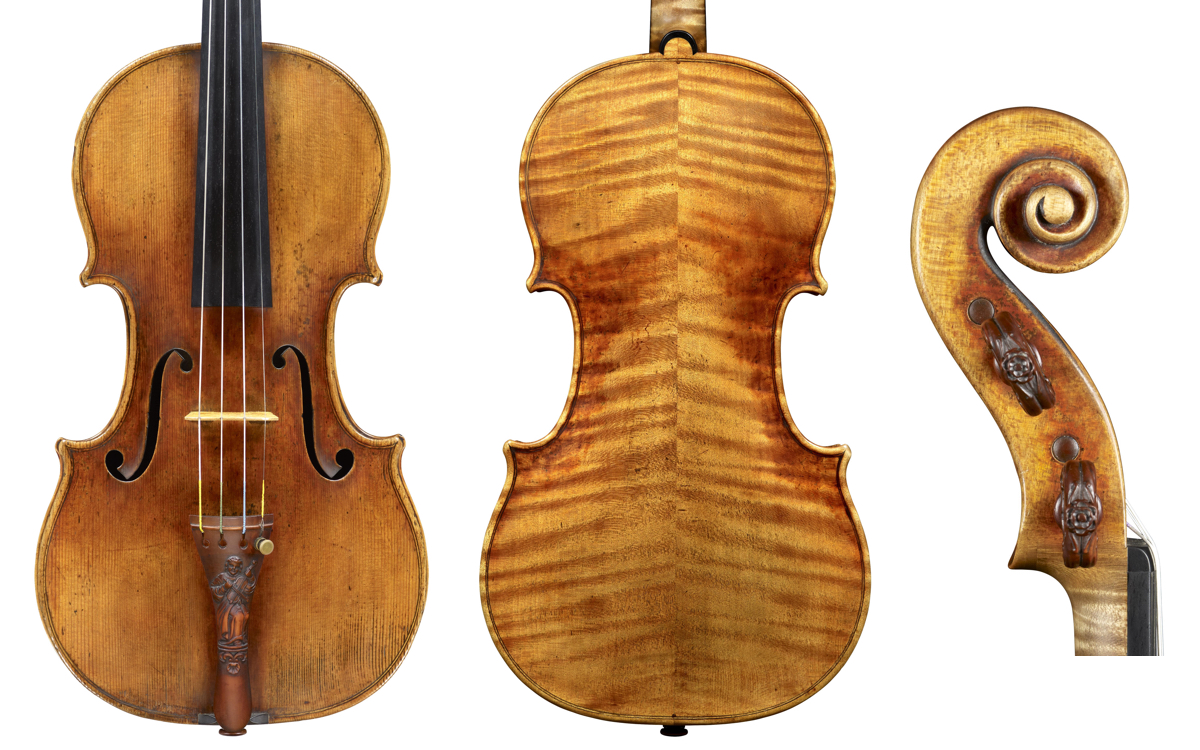
The ‘Leonora Jackson’ Stradivari, 1714. Photos: Jan Röhrmann, ‘Antonius Stradivarius Vol I-IV’

Leonora Jackson primarily played on a violin built by Antonio Stradivari in 1714. Jackson acquired the violin in 1906 – most likely through her teacher, Hungarian violinist Joseph Joaquim, to whom it had belonged since 1880. Jackson performed on the violin in concert until she married and stopped performing in 1915. She sold the violin in 1919, and it was held privately until 1983, when it was purchased by Dr. William and Prof. Judy Sloan of California. Since 1983, Philip Setzer of the Emerson String Quartet and Jan Talich of the Talich String Quartet have used 'Leonora' for several recordings. Oleh Krysa, David Taylor, Eugene Fodor, and Chee Yun have also performed on 'Leonora'. Scott Yoo played the 'Leonora' for 'The Riddle of Bach' episode on the PBS series 'Now Hear This'.
