= Mary Frick Garrett Jacobs =

American socialite and philanthropist (1851–1936)

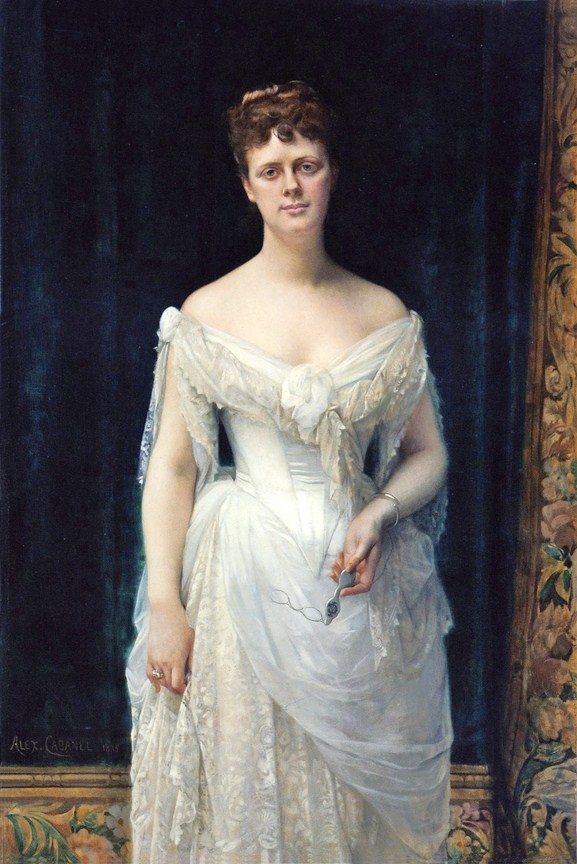
- Portrait of Mary Frick Garrett painted in Paris in 1883, by Alexandre Cabanel. On this trip she began collecting European art.
- Born: Mary Sloan Frick; January 4, 1851; Baltimore, Maryland, U.S.
- Died: October 20, 1936 (aged 85); Baltimore, Maryland, U.S.
- Resting place: Green Mount Cemetery; Baltimore, Maryland, U.S.
- Spouse(s): Robert Garrett m. 1872; Henry Barton Jacobs m. 1902
- Parent(s): William Frederick Frick (1817-1905); Ann Elizabeth Swan Frick (1819-1889)
- Relatives: John W. Garrett (father-in-law); James Swan Frick (brother)

Mary Frick Garrett Jacobs (January 4, 1851 – October 20, 1936) was a Baltimore socialite, philanthropist, and art collector. She is best known for her collection at the Baltimore Museum of Art.

== Personal life ==
Born in Baltimore in 1851, Mary Frick Garrett Jacobs (née Mary Sloan Frick) was one of three children. Her father, William Frederick Frick (1817-1905) was a prominent attorney, and her mother, Ann Elizabeth Swan Frick (1819-1889) was a descendant of Sir George Yeardley, who had been appointed governor of Virginia and was knighted by James VI and I in 1618. Throughout her childhood, she was educated by governesses and tutors and was not permitted to leave home without the accompaniment of a tutor or family member.

In 1872, Mary wed Robert Garrett, the oldest son of John W. Garrett, who was president of the Baltimore and Ohio Railroad and Robert Garrett & Sons Bank. After suffering from years of mental and physical breakdowns, Robert Garret died in 1896 of kidney failure.

Now widowed, Mary married Robert Garret's longtime, personal physician, Henry Barton Jacobs, in 1902 at Grace Protestant Episcopal Church. She did not have any children and died in 1936, leaving an estate of $5.5 million to her husband, Henry Barton Jacobs. She was buried in Green Mount Cemetery. Mary became one of the first women to be part of the Baltimore Municipal Art Society in 1899 and then became an official member in 1902. She ultimately became the society's leader later that year. In addition to her art contributions, she was also well known for her skills in entertaining.

== Charitable works ==
Though Mary divided her time among her residences in Mount Vernon, Baltimore, Uplands (her family's country estate), and Newport, Rhode Island and maintained a suite at the Plaza Hotel in New York City.

She was an active participant in the civic life of Baltimore and contributed to various charitable pursuits. She established the Robert Garrett Hospital for Children at 27 North Carey Street, as well as a training school for nurses attached to the hospital. She paid for the children to recuperate in Mount Airy, Maryland during the summer months and provided the railway fares for mothers to visit their children whenever they wished. While the hospital was turned over to the city in 1923, Jacobs continued to maintain the facility with her own funds and set up six free clinics under the direction of Dr. William S. Baer.

Mary remodeled 11 West Mt. Vernon Place in 1913, building an art gallery and glass domed conservatory. In 1928, she built and equipped the Hospital for Tuberculosis Children on the grounds of the Eudowood Sanitarium. Jacobs supported the American District Telegraph Boys of Baltimore and served as the treasurer of the Aviator Club, which raised money for a sanitarium for tuberculosis in the Blue Ridge Mountains of Maryland.

== Art collection ==
With her fortune, Mary Frick Garrett Jacobs amassed a collection of European paintings from the 15th to 19th centuries, tapestries, miniatures, porcelain, and jades. Her paintings included works by Rembrandt, Frans Hals, Charles Willson Peale, Pietro Perugino, Jacob Isaakszoon van Ruisdael, Jean-Baptiste Greuze, Bartolomé Esteban Murillo, Thomas Sully, and George Romney (painter). In 1934 Jacobs offered her art collection to the Baltimore Museum of Art under several conditions. One of the conditions was that John Russell Pope would be the architect to design the wing in which her collection would be displayed, a request the board acquiesced to.
