= John C. Blackburn =

American politician (died 1883)

21st Mayor of Baltimore
- In office September 21, 1861 – October 1861
- Preceded by: George William Brown
- Succeeded by: Charles J. Baker

Personal details
- Born: Cecil County, Maryland, U.S.
- Died: December 19, 1883 (aged 76)
- Occupation: Politician; lawyer

John C. Blackburn (died December 19, 1883) was an American politician and lawyer. He was Mayor of Baltimore temporarily during the American Civil War for 28 days, from September to October 1861.

== Early life ==
John C. Blackburn was born around 1808 or 1809 in Cecil County, Maryland. He moved to Baltimore around 1826. He worked as an instructor. He studied law and was admitted to the bar in 1830.

== Career ==
In 1830, Blackburn ran for the office of judge of the Baltimore County Criminal Court. Blackburn was elected to the Baltimore City Council. He represented both the Twelfth and Thirteenth Ward; serving in 1844, 1853, 1860 and 1861. He was chosen president of the council's First Branch.

Blackburn succeeded George William Brown as ex officio Mayor of Baltimore on September 21, 1861 when Mayor Brown was arrested by federal authorities and imprisoned in Fort McHenry during the American Civil War. He succeeded Brown due to his role as president of the First Branch of City Council. Blackburn was never elected, but served as mayor for 28 days until he was succeeded by another temporary mayor, Charles J. Baker.

== Personal life ==
Blackburn died on December 19, 1883.

== Legacy ==
Blackburn was not listed in the record of Baltimore as a mayor until 1919. Historians did not know about his successor, another temporary mayor during the Civil War, Charles J. Baker, until 1989.

Political offices
Preceded by George William Brown	Mayor of Baltimore; 1861	Succeeded by Charles J. Baker
