= Walter de Curzon Poultney =

American socialite (1845–1929)

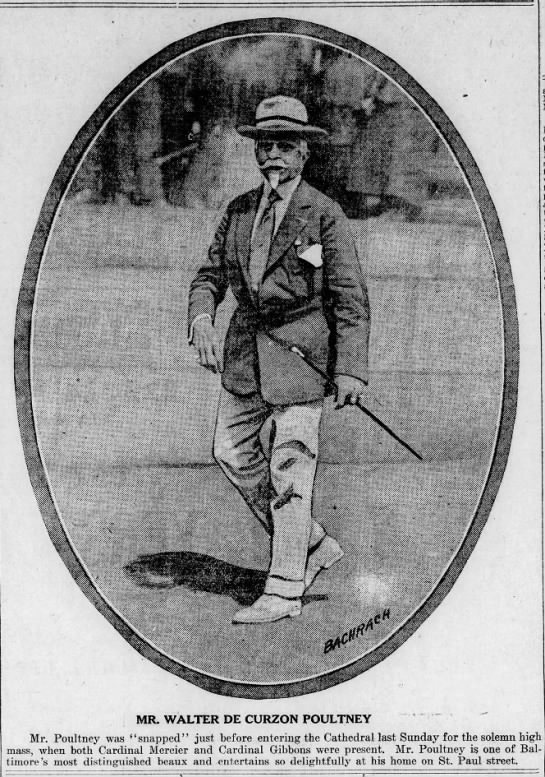
- Born: November 4, 1845
- Died: September 4, 1929 (aged 83)
- Resting place: Green Mount Cemetery
- Occupation: Art collector
- Known for: Baltimore high-society member

Signature
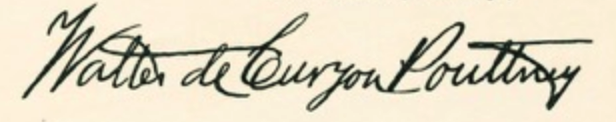

Walter de Curzon Poultney (November 4, 1845 – September 4, 1929) was one of Baltimore, Maryland's most colorful and flamboyant high-society members. He was prominent in Baltimore society between the end of the American Civil War and the Roaring Twenties. He died shortly before the stock market crash of 1929.

== Family and friends ==
Poultney was a direct descendant (great-grandson) of Ellin Moale North, the first white child born in the city of Baltimore, and John Moale, colonel of the Baltimore Town Militia. He was also the nephew of Philip E. Thomas, the first president of the Baltimore & Ohio Railroad. His nephew, James W. Poultney, later became a professor emeritus of classics at the Johns Hopkins University.

"Sir Walter", as he was known to his intimates (as a result of his stark resemblance of Sir Walter Raleigh), was well known around the world. He was considered an intimate friend of Cardinal James Gibbons of the Archdiocese of Baltimore. They would often be found strolling Charles Street near the Baltimore Basilica, the oldest Catholic cathedral in America. Poultney was also a close friend of Louisa Cavendish-Bentinck, otherwise known as Lady Strathmore, the great-grandmother of Queen Elizabeth II. Walter even sent Lady Strathmore's granddaughter (the future Queen Mother) a silver bowl as a wedding gift and received in return a "gracious and girlish letter" on the night before her marriage to the Duke of York.

== Artwork and clothing ==
Poultney's world travels led him to amass a large collection of art in his home. Among the works include life sized portraits of Florentine and Milanese leaders painted as far back as 1085 and 1402. China from Dresden, Italian gilded chairs, mahogany cabinets built in Holland, French sofas, and early American paintings are just a handful of the priceless treasure he collected. He even had a marble figure of "The Fisher Boy" by Hiram Powers – the only other known replica is in the Metropolitan Museum. Following his death, Poultney’s large and unusual collection of art and rare antiquities went up for auction November 19, 1929. Poultney's eccentricity was not only confined to his residence. He was known to change his clothing often – as many as three times daily. He was seen in 18th-century garb at costume parties and other social gatherings. Those who knew Poultney saw him as a Baltimore Beau Brummell.

== Final years ==
Poultney died on September 4, 1929, after suffering a fall from his couch in his St. Paul Street home. He had spent the last three years of his life in a paralytic state. He was buried in Green Mount Cemetery.
