= William Wallace Spence =

American financier (1815–1915)

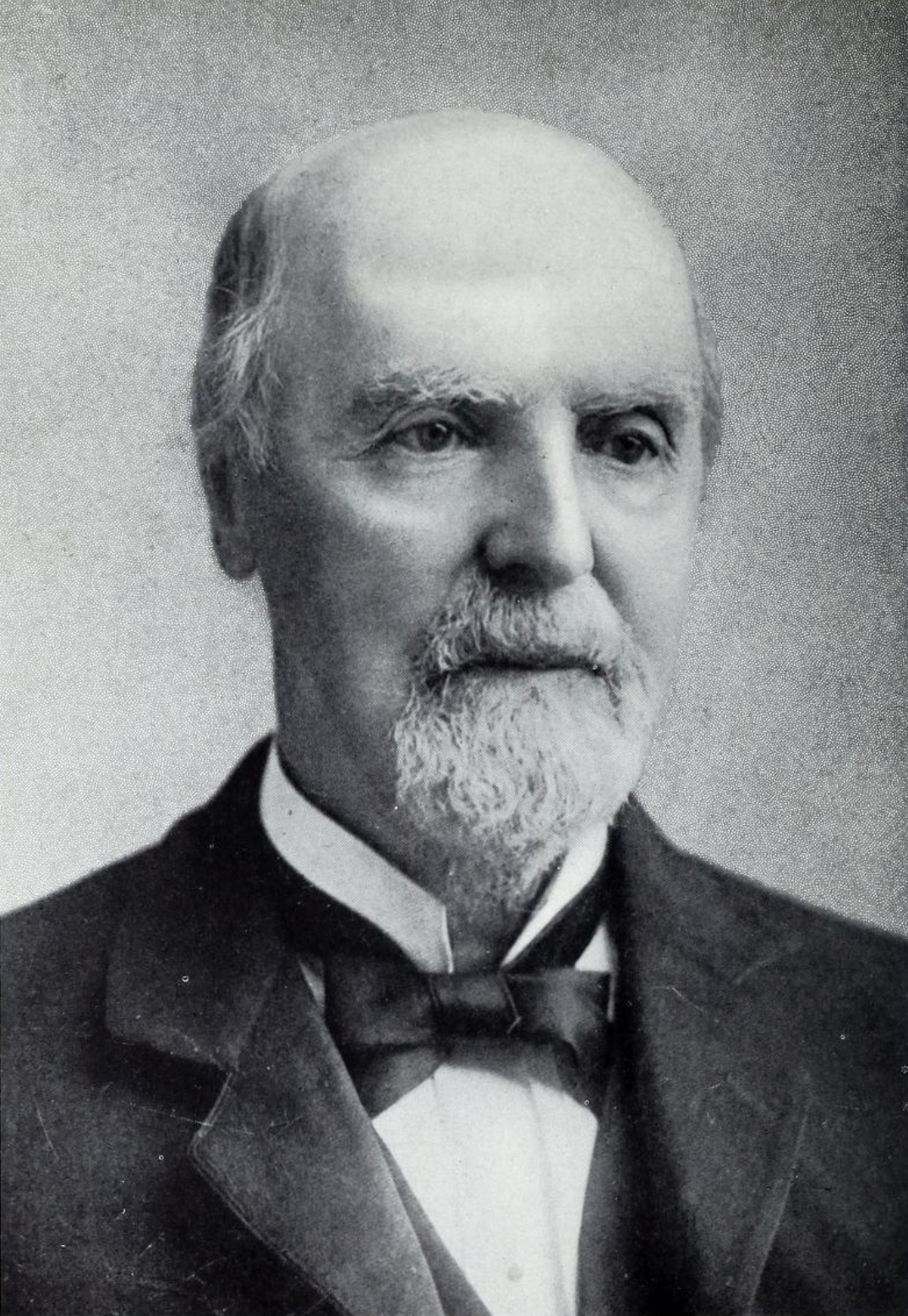
- Spence in 1914 publication
- Born: October 18, 1815; Edinburgh, Scotland
- Died: November 3, 1915 (aged 100); Baltimore, Maryland, U.S.
- Resting place: Green Mount Cemetery; Baltimore, Maryland, U.S.
- Spouses: Mary Susan (or Agnes) Winkley (died) Charlotte Norris (m. 1863, died)
- Children: 4

William Wallace Spence (October 18, 1815 – November 3, 1915) was a Baltimore financier. He was a founding partner of Spence & Reid, which manufactured clipper ships, established an import/export firm at Pratt Street’s Old Bowley’s Wharf, and founded The Mercantile Trust and Deposit Company.

== Early life ==
William Wallace Spence was born on October 18, 1815, in Edinburgh to Sarah (née Dickson) and John Spence. His father was a physician. He attended high school in Edinburgh and immigrated to the United States at the age of eighteen with only one-hundred dollars in his pocket.

== Career ==
Spence first lived in New York City for five years and worked as a clerk there. Spence then moved to Norfolk, Virginia, and was employed as a shipping clerk at Robert Soutter & Sons. He later became a member. He came to Baltimore to enter into a business partnership with Andrew Reid, forming the corporation Spence & Reid, which manufactured clipper ships. Spence was a finance commissioner with Enoch Pratt. Spence also set up an import/export firm called W. W. Spence & Co. at Pratt Street’s Old Bowley’s Wharf. Later, he founded the Mercantile Trust and Deposit Company and became an officer of The Eutaw Savings Bank.

== Civic activity ==
Spence was a pillar in the Baltimore community. He was the president of the Municipal Art Society, active in the formation of the First Presbyterian Church, and a prominent contributor to Johns Hopkins University and Hospital. He is best known for erecting a thirteen-foot, iron statue of William Wallace, the Scottish martyr, in 1892 in Druid Hill Park and donating a copy of Danish sculptor Bertel Thorvaldsen’s Christus Consolator to Johns Hopkins Hospital in 1896. Spence also served as president of the Presbyterian Eye, Ear, Nose and Throat Hospital. In 1840, Spence served as treasurer of The Egenton Home.

== Personal life ==
Spence married Mary Susan Winkley (or Agnes Winkley). They had four children, including Mrs. Owen N. Butler, Mrs. John Gill and W. W. Spencer Jr. His wife predeceased him. Spence married Charlotte Morris of Baltimore in 1863. She died around 1897.

Spence died on November 3, 1915, at his home at 1205 St. Paul Street in Baltimore. He was buried at Green Mount Cemetery in Baltimore.
