= George William Brown (mayor) =

Mayor of Baltimore, Maryland, from 1860 to 1861

George W. Brown
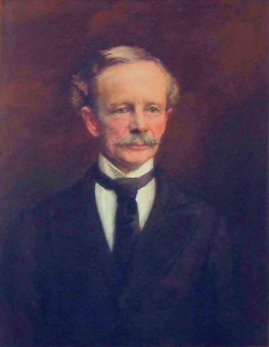

20th Mayor of Baltimore
- In office November 12, 1860 – September 12, 1861
- Preceded by: Thomas Swann
- Succeeded by: John C. Blackburn

Personal details
- Born: October 13, 1812 Baltimore, Maryland, U.S.
- Died: September 5, 1890 (aged 77) Lake Mohonk, New York, U.S.
- Resting place: Green Mount Cemetery
- Party: Constitutional Union
- Spouse: Clara Maria Brune (m. 1839; died 1919)
- Children: Arthur John; Frederick; Ellen; Mary
- Education: Rutgers University
- Profession: Judge, academic

George William Brown (October 13, 1812 – September 5, 1890) was an American politician, judge and academic. A graduate of Rutgers College in 1831, he was mayor of Baltimore from 1860 to 1861, professor in University of Maryland School of Law, and 2nd Chief Judge and Supreme Bench of Baltimore City. He was founder and president of the Bar Association of Baltimore City and the Library Company of the Baltimore Bar.

== Career ==
Brown was admitted to the bar in 1834. Brown was a founder of the Library Company of the Baltimore Bar (1840) and from 1861 to 1874, he was its president. He was a founder of the Maryland Historical Society in 1844. The first digest of Maryland Court of Appeals decisions was compiled with his assistance and published in 1849. Brown was mayor of Baltimore, Maryland, from 1860 to 1861 and a delegate to the Constitutional Convention in Baltimore in 1867. From 1871 to 1873, he was a University of Maryland School of Law professor from 1871 to 1873. He was elected in 1872 to serve as 2nd Chief Judge, Supreme Bench of Baltimore City, a position he held from 1873 to 1888. He was founder (1880) and 11th president of the Bar Association of Baltimore City from 1889 to 1890.

== Pratt Street Riot ==
Brown played an important role in controlling the Pratt Street Riot, where the first bloodshed of the Civil War occurred, on April 19, 1861. During the riot, Brown accompanied a column of the Sixth Massachusetts regiment through the streets. When the column he was leading was assailed by the mob, "the mayor's patience was soon exhausted, and he seized a musket from the hands of one of the men and killed a man therewith." Immediately following the Riot, Baltimore saw much lawlessness, as citizens destroyed the offices of pro-Union German newspapers and looted shops in search of guns and other weapons. Mayor Brown and Maryland businessmen visited the White House to urge President Abraham Lincoln to reroute Union troops around Baltimore city to Annapolis to avoid further confrontations that they felt would result from additional troops passing through the city.

In the few days following the Pratt Street Riot, Governor Hicks likely assented to Mayor Brown's decision to dispatch the Maryland militiamen to destroy the railroad bridges over the rivers north of the city, to prevent more troops from passing through Baltimore. This was an act both Hicks and Brown would later deny—though Isaac R. Trimble, commanding Baltimore militia companies immediately following the Riot—later claimed that Brown authorized destruction of the railroad bridges, which may explain Brown's later arrest and imprisonment by federal authorities. Shortly thereafter, a Maryland militia captain and Baltimore County farmer, John Merryman, was arrested, held at Fort McHenry and later denied a writ of habeas corpus, on grounds that President Lincoln had suspended the writ (but only along rail lines in Maryland). This arrest sparked the case of Ex parte Merryman.

President Lincoln agreed to reroute Union troops around Baltimore to Annapolis, so they could then travel to Washington. Northern troops (state militia companies) were able to arrive in Washington, thus avoiding further bloodshed in Baltimore.

== Imprisonment ==
On May 13, 1861, the Union army entered Baltimore, occupied the city, and declared martial law. Mayor Brown was arrested on September 12, 1861, at his home, with Habeas corpus suspended. He was imprisoned at Fort McHenry for one night, then transported to Fort Monroe in Hampton Roads, Virginia, and held for two weeks. Afterwards he was moved to Fort Warren in Boston Harbor and held for fourteen months. Brown was released on November 27, 1862. He returned to Baltimore and resumed his law practice. Francis Key Howard, the grandson of Francis Scott Key, was also made a prisoner.

== Later life ==
While speaking at St. John's College in Annapolis, MD, in 1869, Brown made reference to “A great university hereafter to be established in Baltimore … planned … by the wealthiest of her citizens, a native of this county [ Anne Arundel County ].” While Brown did not name the individual, he was referring to Johns Hopkins, who in 1867 had announced his intention to found a university and a hospital upon his death. Brown and Hopkins were contemporaries and respected each other, so it was not surprising that Brown should be named one of the twelve original trustees of the Johns Hopkins University.

After Hopkins’ death on December 24, 1873, and the settling of his estate, the trustees began in earnest to plan the new university. While it was Daniel Coit Gilman’s idea to found the first research university in the United States, based on the German model, Brown heartily supported the idea. Brown also took part in debates over how much of the old classical curriculum should be preserved in the new scheme. Should Greek and Latin be replaced by modern languages? Should students be allowed to choose elective courses, or should their classes be prescribed by their course of study? How was religion to be integrated into a sectarian institution?

Brown offered his own ideas, one of which was that the university should send into the world “upright, refined, and highly cultivated young men.” He also declared that the aim of the new university should be “to bring together a competent corps of professors, some of whom, if possible, should be teachers in the largest sense, that is, should have the ability and the leisure too, to add something by their writings and discoveries to the world’s stock of literature and science….” This idea was paraphrased and endorsed by President Gilman in his Inaugural Address delivered on February 22, 1876.

Almost three years before he died, Brown wrote his memoir. In it, he referred to Quaker Johns Hopkins as a "wealthy Union man" and a member of a committee of bankers who gave $500,000 to the city of Baltimore after the first blood in the Civil War was shed there. Hopkins selected Brown as one of the trustees of the university (but not of the hospital) who would oversee the construction and founding of the institutions now known as the Johns Hopkins University and Johns Hopkins Hospital.

Brown died on September 5, 1890, in Mohonk Lake, New York. He was buried in Green Mount Cemetery in Baltimore.

== See also ==
- Baltimore Plot
- George Proctor Kane
- 1860 United States presidential election
- Thomas Holliday Hicks
- John Merryman
- Ex parte Merryman
- Maryland, My Maryland
- Henry Stump

Political offices
Preceded by Thomas Swann	Mayor of Baltimore; 1860–1861	Succeeded by John C. Blackburn
