= Habeas Corpus Suspension Act (1863) =

American law during the Civil War

- Long title: An Act relating to Habeas Corpus, and regulating Judicial Proceedings in Certain Cases

Citations
- Statutes at Large: 12 Stat. 755

Legislative history
- Introduced in the House of Representatives as H.R. 591, A bill to indemnify the President and other persons for suspending the privilege of the writ of habeas corpus, and acts done in pursuance thereof by Thaddeus Stevens (R–PA) on December 5, 1862; Committee consideration by House Judiciary, Senate Judiciary; Passed the House of Representatives on December 8, 1862 (90–45); Passed the Senate on January 28, 1863 (33–7); Reported by the joint conference committee on February 27, 1863; agreed to by the House of Representatives on March 2, 1863 (99–44) and by the Senate on March 2, 1863 (voice vote); Signed into law by President Abraham Lincoln on March 3, 1863

Major amendments
- 14 Stat. 46 (1866), 14 Stat. 385 (1867)

United States Supreme Court cases
- ex parte Vallandigham, 68 U.S. (1 Wall.) 243 (1864) ex parte Milligan, 71 U.S. (4 Wall.) 2 (1866)

The Habeas Corpus Suspension Act, 12 Stat. 755 (1863), entitled An Act relating to Habeas Corpus, and regulating Judicial Proceedings in Certain Cases, was an Act of Congress that authorized the President of the United States to suspend the right of habeas corpus in response to the American Civil War and provided for the release of political prisoners. It began in the House of Representatives as an indemnity bill, introduced on December 5, 1862, releasing the President and his subordinates from any liability for having suspended habeas corpus without congressional approval. The Senate amended the House's bill, and the compromise reported out of the conference committee altered it to qualify the indemnity and to suspend habeas corpus on Congress's own authority. Abraham Lincoln signed the bill into law on March 3, 1863, and suspended habeas corpus under the authority it granted him six months later. The suspension was partially lifted with the issuance of Proclamation 148 by Andrew Johnson, and the Act became inoperative with the end of the Civil War. The exceptions to Johnson's Proclamation 148 were the States of Virginia, Kentucky, Tennessee, North Carolina, South Carolina, Georgia, Florida, Alabama, Mississippi, Louisiana, Arkansas, and Texas, the District of Columbia, and the Territories of New Mexico and Arizona.

== Background ==
At the outbreak of the American Civil War in April 1861, Washington, D.C., was largely undefended, rioters in Baltimore, Maryland threatened to disrupt the reinforcement of the capital by rail, and Congress was not in session. The military situation made it dangerous to call Congress into session. In that same month (April 1861), Abraham Lincoln, the President of the United States, therefore authorized his military commanders to suspend the writ of habeas corpus between Washington, D.C., and Philadelphia (and later up through New York City). Numerous individuals were arrested, including John Merryman and a number of Baltimore police commissioners; the administration of justice in Baltimore was carried out through military officials. When Judge William Fell Giles of the United States District Court for the District of Maryland issued a writ of habeas corpus, the commander of Fort McHenry, Major W. W. Morris, wrote in reply, "At the date of issuing your writ, and for two weeks previous, the city in which you live, and where your court has been held, was entirely under the control of revolutionary authorities."

Merryman's lawyers appealed, and in early June 1861, U.S. Supreme Court Chief Justice Roger Taney, writing as the United States Circuit Court for Maryland, ruled in ex parte Merryman that Article I, section 9 of the United States Constitution reserves to Congress the power to suspend habeas corpus and thus that the President's suspension was invalid. The rest of the Supreme Court had nothing to do with Merryman, and the other two Justices from the South, John Catron and James Moore Wayne, acted as Unionists; for instance, Catron's charge to a Saint Louis grand jury, saying that armed resistance to the federal government was treason, was quoted in the New York Tribune of July 14, 1861. The President's advisers said the circuit court's ruling was invalid and it was ignored.

When Congress was called into special session, July 4, 1861, President Lincoln issued a message to both houses defending his various actions, including the suspension of the writ of habeas corpus, arguing that it was both necessary and constitutional for him to have suspended it without Congress. Early in the session, Senator Henry Wilson introduced a joint resolution "to approve and confirm certain acts of the President of the United States, for suppressing insurrection and rebellion", including the suspension of habeas corpus (S. No. 1). Senator Lyman Trumbull, the Republican chairman of the Senate Committee on the Judiciary, had reservations about its imprecise wording, so the resolution, also opposed by anti-war Democrats, was never brought to a vote. On July 17, 1861, Trumbull introduced a bill to suppress insurrection and sedition which included a suspension of the writ of habeas corpus upon Congress's authority (S. 33). That bill was not brought to a vote before Congress ended its first session on August 6, 1861, due to obstruction by Democrats, and on July 11, 1862, the Senate Committee on the Judiciary recommended that it not be passed during the second session, either, but its proposed habeas corpus suspension section formed the basis of the Habeas Corpus Suspension Act.

In September 1861 the arrests continued, including a sitting member of Congress from Maryland, Henry May, along with one third of the Maryland General Assembly, and Lincoln expanded the zone within which the writ was suspended. When Lincoln's dismissal of Justice Taney's ruling was criticized in an editorial that month by a prominent Baltimore newspaper editor Frank Key Howard, Francis Scott Key's grandson and Justice Taney's grand-nephew by marriage, he was himself arrested by federal troops without trial. He was imprisoned in Fort McHenry, which, as he noted, was the same fort where the Star Spangled Banner had been waving "o'er the land of the free" in his grandfather's song.

In early 1862 Lincoln took a step back from the suspension of habeas corpus controversy. On February 14, he ordered all political prisoners released, with some exceptions (such as the aforementioned newspaper editor) and offered them amnesty for past treason or disloyalty, so long as they did not aid the Confederacy. In March 1862 Congressman Henry May, who had been released in December 1861, introduced a bill requiring the federal government to either indict by grand jury or release all other "political prisoners" still held without habeas corpus. May's bill passed the House in summer 1862, and it would later be included in the Habeas Corpus Suspension Act, which would require actual indictments for suspected traitors.

In September, faced with opposition to his calling up of the militia, Lincoln again suspended habeas corpus, this time through the entire country, and made anyone charged with interfering with the draft, discouraging enlistments, or aiding the Confederacy subject to martial law. In the interim, the controversy continued with several calls made for prosecution of those who acted under Lincoln's suspension of habeas corpus; former Secretary of War Simon Cameron had even been arrested in connection with a suit for trespass vi et armis, assault and battery, and false imprisonment. Senator Thomas Holliday Hicks, who had been Governor of Maryland during the crisis, told the Senate, "I believe that arrests and arrests alone saved the State of Maryland not only from greater degradation than she suffered, but from everlasting destruction." He also said, "I approved them [the arrests] then, and I approve them now; and the only thing for which I condemn the Administration in regard to that matter is that they let some of these men out."

== Legislative history ==
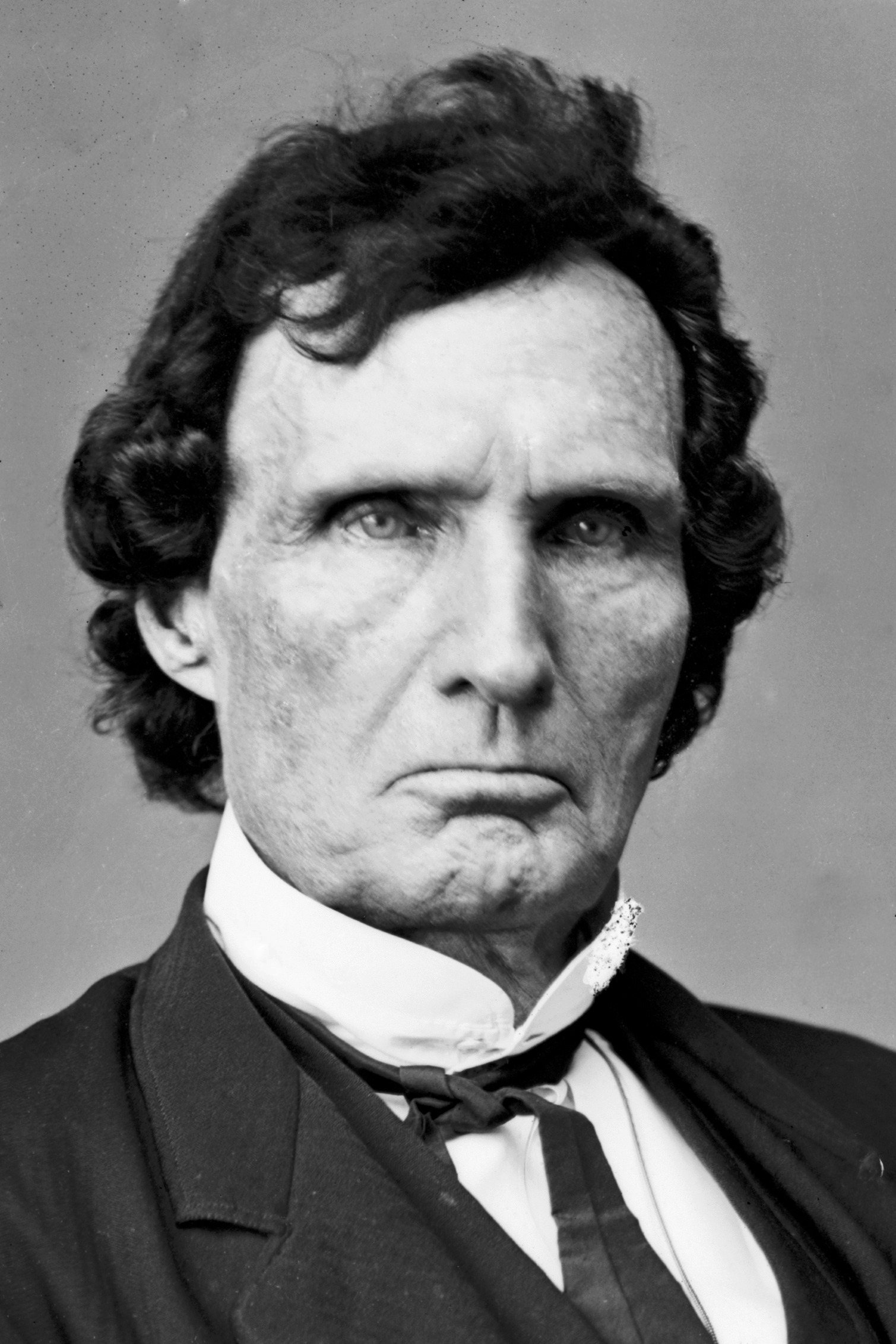
Representative Thaddeus Stevens of Pennsylvania introduced the bill.

When the Thirty-seventh Congress of the United States opened its third session in December 1862, Representative Thaddeus Stevens introduced a bill "to indemnify the President and other persons for suspending the writ of habeas corpus, and acts done in pursuance thereof" (H.R. 591). This bill passed the House over relatively weak opposition on December 8, 1862.

When it came time for the Senate to consider Stevens' indemnity bill, however, the Committee on the Judiciary's amendment substituted an entirely new bill for it. The Senate version referred all suits and prosecutions regarding arrest and imprisonment to the regional federal circuit court with the stipulation that no one acting under the authority of the president could be faulted if "there was reasonable or probable cause", or if they acted "in good faith", until after the adjournment of the next session of Congress. Unlike Stevens' bill, it did not suggest that the president's suspension of habeas corpus upon his own authority had been legal.

The Senate passed its version of the bill on January 28, 1863, and the House took it up in mid-February before voting to send the bill to a conference committee on February 19. The House appointed Thaddeus Stevens, John Bingham, and George H. Pendleton to the conference committee. The Senate agreed to a conference the following day and appointed Lyman Trumbull, Jacob Collamer, and Waitman T. Willey. Stevens, Bingham, Trumbull, and Collamer were all Republicans; Willey was a Unionist; Pendleton was the only Democrat.

On February 27, the conference committee issued its report. The result was an entirely new bill authorizing the explicit suspension of habeas corpus.

Be it enacted by the Senate and House of Representatives of the United States of America in Congress assembled, That during the present rebellion, the President of the United States, whenever in his judgment the public safety may require it, is authorized to suspend the privilege of the writ of habeas corpus in any case throughout the United States or any part thereof. And whenever and wherever the said privilege shall be suspended, as aforesaid, no military or other officer shall be compelled, in answer to any writ of habeas corpus, to return the body of any person or persons detained by him by authority of the President; but upon a certificate, under oath, of the officer having charge of any one so detained, that such person is detained by him as a prisoner under the authority of the President, further proceedings under the writ of habeas corpus shall be suspended by the judge or court having issued the writ so long as said suspension by the President shall remain in force and said rebellion continue.

In the House, several members left, depriving the chamber of a quorum. The Sergeant-at-Arms was dispatched to compel attendance and several representatives were fined for their absence. The following Monday, March 2, the day before the Thirty-seventh Congress had previously voted to adjourn, the House voted to accept the new bill, with 99 members voting in the affirmative and 44 against.

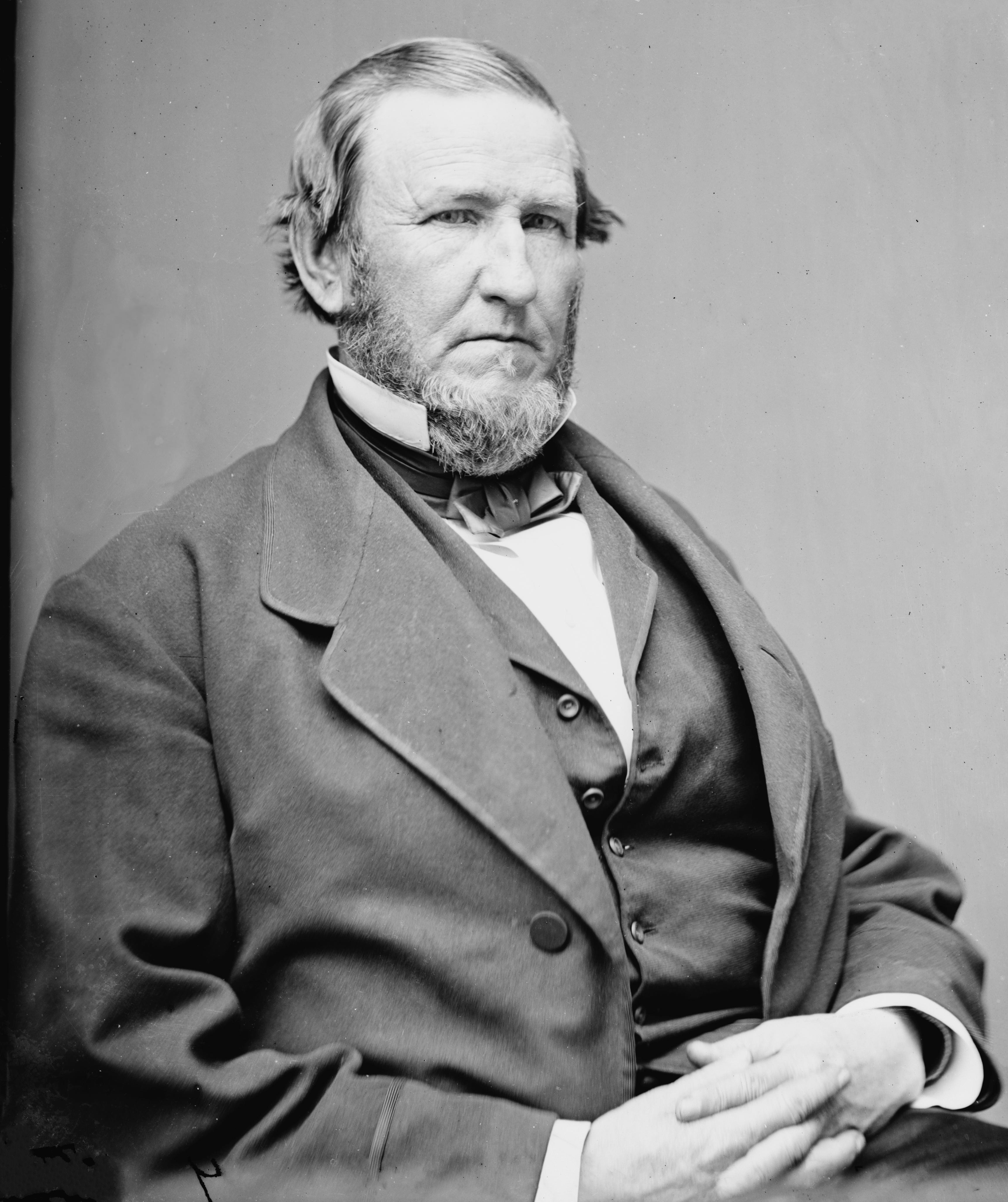
Senator Lazarus W. Powell of Kentucky vehemently opposed the bill.

The Senate spent the evening of March 2 into the early morning of the next day debating the conference committee amendments. There, several Democratic Senators attempted a filibuster. Cloture had not yet been adopted as a rule in the Senate, so there was no way to prevent a minuscule minority from holding up business by refusing to surrender the floor. First James Walter Wall of New Jersey spoke until midnight, when Willard Saulsbury, Sr., of Delaware gave Republicans an opportunity to surrender by moving to adjourn. That motion was defeated 5–31, after which Lazarus W. Powell of Kentucky began to speak, yielding for a motion to adjourn from William Alexander Richardson of Illinois forty minutes later, which was also defeated, 5–30. Powell continued to speak, entertaining some hostile questions from Edgar Cowan of Pennsylvania which provoked further discussion, but retaining control of the floor. At seven minutes past two in the morning, James A. Bayard Jr., of Delaware motioned to adjourn, the motion again failing, 4–35, and Powell retained control of the floor. Powell yielded the floor to Bayard, who then began to speak. At some point later, Powell made a motion to adjourn, but Bayard apparently had not yielded to him for that motion. When this was pointed out, Powell told Bayard to sit down so he could make the motion, assuming that Bayard would retain control of the floor if the motion failed, as it did, 4–33. The presiding officer, Samuel C. Pomeroy of Kansas, immediately called the question of concurring in the report of the conference committee and declared that the ayes had it, and Trumbull immediately moved that the Senate move on to other business, which motion was agreed to. The Democrats objected that Bayard still had the floor, that he had merely yielded it for a motion to adjourn, but Pomeroy said he had no record of why Bayard had yielded the floor, meaning the floor was open once Powell's motion to adjourn had failed, meaning that the presiding officer was free to call the question. In this way, the bill cleared the Senate.

The next day, Senate Democrats protested the manner in which the bill had passed. During the ensuing discussion, the president pro tempore asked permission "to sign a large number of enrolled bills", among which was the Habeas Corpus Suspension Act. The House had already been informed that the Senate had passed the bill, and the engrossed bills were sent to the president, who immediately signed the Habeas Corpus Suspension Act into law.

== Provisions ==
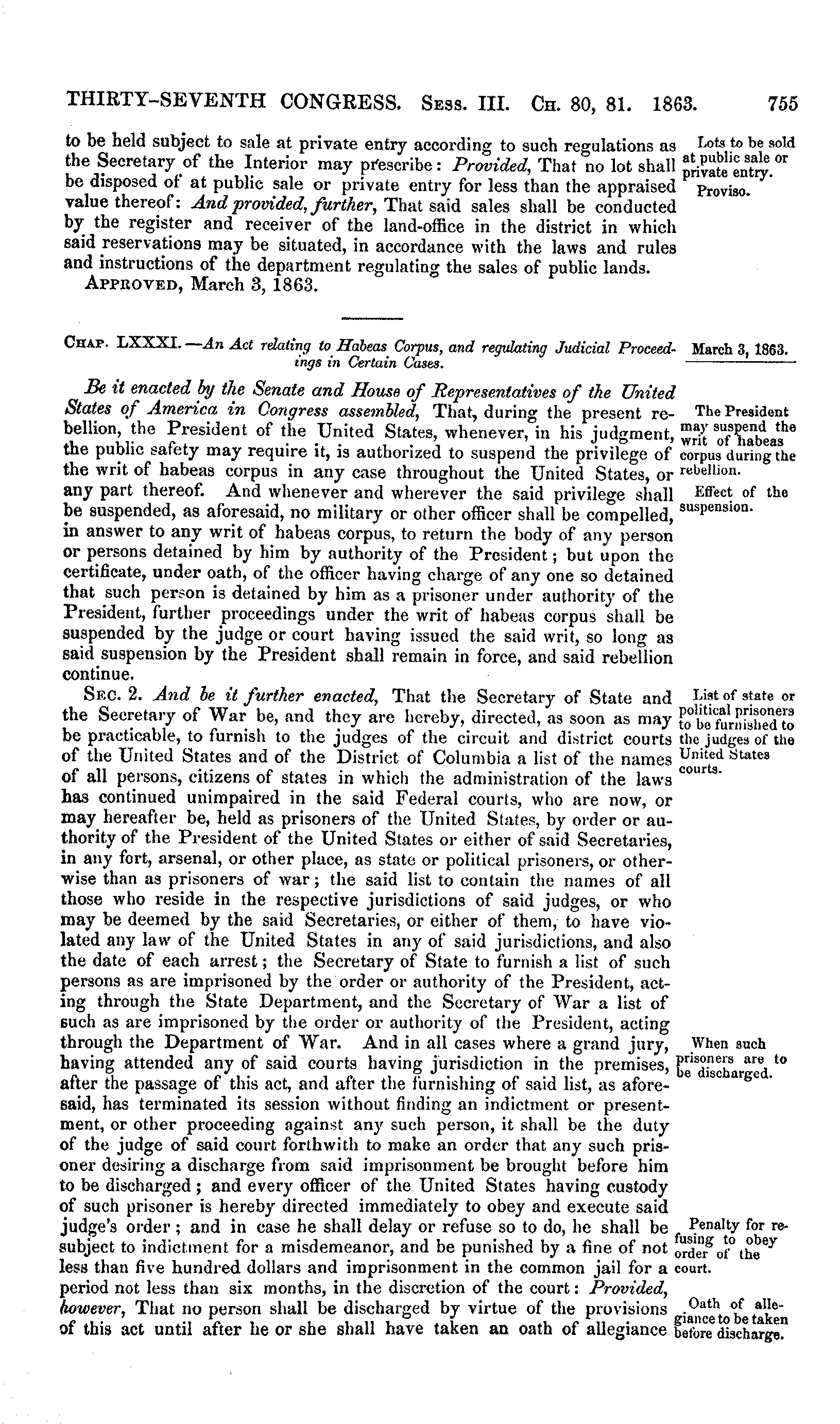
Statutes at Large, Volume 12, Page 755, containing the opening text of the Habeas Corpus Suspension Act

The Act allowed the president to suspend the writ of habeas corpus so long as the Civil War was ongoing. Normally, a judge would issue a writ of habeas corpus to compel a jailer to state the reason for holding a particular prisoner and, if the judge was not satisfied that the prisoner was being held lawfully, could release him. As a result of the Act, the jailer could now reply that a prisoner was held under the authority of the president and this response would suspend further proceedings in the case until the president lifted the suspension of habeas corpus or the Civil War ended.

The Act also provided for the release of prisoners in a section originally authored by Maryland Congressman Henry May, who had been arrested without recourse to habeas in 1861, while serving in Congress. It required the secretaries of State and War to provide the judges of the federal district and circuit courts with a list of every person who was held as a state or political prisoner and not as a prisoner of war wherever the federal courts were still operational. If the secretaries did not include a prisoner on the list, the judge was ordered to free them. If a grand jury failed to indict anyone on the list before the end of its session, that prisoner was to be released, so long as they took an oath of allegiance and swore that they would not aid the rebellion. Judges could, if they concluded that the public safety required it, set bail before releasing such unindicted prisoners. If the grand jury did indict a prisoner, that person could still be set free on bail if they were charged with a crime that in peacetime would ordinarily make them eligible for bail. These provisions for those held as "political prisoners", as Henry May felt he had been, were first proposed by Congressman May in a bill in March 1862.

The Act further restricted how and why military and civilian officials could be sued. Anyone acting in an official capacity could not be convicted for false arrest, false imprisonment, trespassing, or any crime related to a search and seizure; this applied to actions done under Lincoln's prior suspensions of habeas corpus as well as future ones. If anyone brought a suit against a civilian or military official in any state court, or if state prosecutors went after them, the official could request that the trial instead take place in the (friendlier) federal court system. Moreover, if the official won the case, they could collect double in damages from the plaintiff. Any case could be appealed to the United States Supreme Court on a writ of error. Any suits to be brought against civilian or military officials had to be brought within two years of the arrest or the passage of the Act, whichever was later.

== Aftermath ==
President Lincoln used the authority granted him under the Act on September 15, 1863, to suspend habeas corpus throughout the Union in any case involving prisoners of war, spies, traitors, or any member of the military. He subsequently both suspended habeas corpus and imposed martial law in Kentucky on July 5, 1864. An objection was made to the Act that it did not itself suspend the writ of habeas corpus but instead conferred that authority upon the president, and that the Act therefore violated the nondelegation doctrine prohibiting Congress from transferring its legislative authority, but no court adopted that view. Andrew Johnson restored civilian courts to Kentucky in October 1865, and revoked the suspension of habeas corpus in states and territories that had not joined the rebellion on December 1 later that year. At least one court had already ruled that the authority of the President to suspend the privilege of the writ had expired with the end of the rebellion a year and a half earlier.

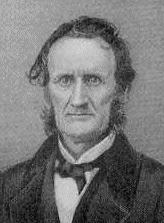
Lambdin P. Milligan, one of those arrested while habeas corpus was suspended and tried by military commission

One of those arrested while habeas corpus was suspended was Lambdin P. Milligan. Milligan was arrested in Indiana on October 5, 1864, for conspiring with four others to steal weapons and invade Union prisoner-of-war camps to release Confederate prisoners. They were tried before a military tribunal, found guilty, and sentenced to hang. In ex parte Milligan, the United States Supreme Court held that the Habeas Corpus Suspension Act did not authorize military tribunals, that as a matter of constitutional law the suspension of habeas corpus did not itself authorize trial by military tribunals, and that neither the Act nor the laws of war permitted the imposition of martial law where civilian courts were open and operating unimpeded.

The Court had earlier avoided the questions arising in ex parte Milligan regarding the Habeas Corpus Suspension Act in a case concerning former Congressman and Ohio Copperhead politician Clement Vallandigham. General Ambrose E. Burnside had him arrested in May 1863 claiming his anti-Lincoln and anti-war speeches continued to give aid to the enemy after his having been warned to cease doing so. Vallandigham was tried by a military tribunal and sentenced to two years in a military prison. Lincoln quickly commuted his sentence to banishment to the Confederacy. Vallandigham appealed his sentence, arguing that the Enrollment Act did not authorize his trial by a military tribunal rather than in ordinary civilian courts, that he was not ordinarily subject to court martial, and that General Burnside could not expand the jurisdiction of military courts on his own authority. The Supreme Court did not address the substance of Vallandigham's appeal, instead denying that it possessed the jurisdiction to review the proceedings of military tribunals upon a writ of habeas corpus without explicit congressional authorization. Vallandigham was subsequently deported to the South where he turned himself in for arrest as a Union citizen behind enemy lines and was placed in a Confederate prison.

Mary Elizabeth Jenkins Surratt (May 1823 – July 7, 1865) was an American boarding house owner who was convicted by a military tribunal of taking part in the conspiracy to assassinate President Abraham Lincoln and sentenced to death. On the morning of July 7, the date Surratt was scheduled to be executed, in a last ditch effort to save their client's life, her attorneys, Clampitt and Aiken asked a District of Columbia court for a writ of habeas corpus, arguing that the military tribunal had no jurisdiction over their client. The court issued the writ at 3 a.m., and it was served on General Winfield Scott Hancock. Hancock was ordered to produce Surratt by 10 a.m. General Hancock sent an aide to General John F. Hartranft, who commanded the Old Capitol Prison, ordering him not to admit any United States marshal (as this would prevent the marshal from serving a similar writ on Hartranft). President Johnson was informed that the court had issued the writ, and promptly cancelled it at 11:30 a.m. under the authority granted to him by the Habeas Corpus Suspension Act of 1863. General Hancock and United States Attorney General James Speed personally appeared in court and informed the judge of the cancellation of the writ. Mary Surratt was hanged, becoming the first woman executed by the United States federal government.

Because all of the provisions of the Act referred to the Civil War, they were rendered inoperative with the conclusion of the war and no longer remain in effect. The Habeas Corpus Act of 1867 partially restored habeas corpus, extending federal habeas corpus protection to anyone "restrained of his or her liberty in violation of the constitution, or of any treaty or law of the United States," while continuing to deny habeas relief to anyone who had already been arrested for a military offense or for aiding the Confederacy. The provisions for the release of prisoners were incorporated into the Civil Rights Act of 1871, which authorized the suspension of habeas corpus in order to break the Ku Klux Klan. Congress strengthened the protections for officials sued for actions arising from the suspension of habeas corpus in 1866 and 1867. Its provisions were omitted from the Revised Statutes of the United States, the codification of federal legislation in effect as of 1873.

== See also ==
- Habeas corpus in the United States
- Suspension clause
- United States ex rel. Murphy v. Porter
