= Frank Key Howard =

American newspaper editor

Frank Key Howard (October 25, 1826 – May 29, 1872) (also cited as Francis Key Howard) was an American newspaper editor and journalist. The grandson of Francis Scott Key and Revolutionary War colonel John Eager Howard, Howard was the editor of the Daily Exchange, a Baltimore newspaper sympathetic to the Confederacy.

Just after midnight on September 13, 1861, he was arrested without a warrant at his home by U.S. Major General Nathaniel Prentice Banks on the direct orders of General George B. McClellan enforcing the policy of President Abraham Lincoln. (In his book he writes that he was told by the arresting officer that the order had come from Secretary of State William Seward.) The basis for his arrest was the writing of an editorial printed in his newspaper that was critical of Lincoln's suspension of the writ of habeas corpus, of the declaration by the Lincoln administration of martial law in Baltimore, and of the imprisonment without charge of Baltimore mayor George William Brown, sitting U.S. Congressman Henry May, all the police commissioners of Baltimore, and the entire city council. Lincoln's suspension of habeas corpus in Maryland had already been declared unconstitutional by U.S. Supreme Court Chief Justice Roger Taney (Howard's great-uncle by marriage) in Ex parte Merryman, but Lincoln had ignored the federal court ruling. Howard was initially confined to Fort McHenry, the same fort his grandfather Francis Scott Key saw withstand a British bombardment during the War of 1812, which inspired him to write "The Star-Spangled Banner", which would become the national anthem of the United States of America. He was then transferred first to Fort Lafayette in Lower New York Bay off the coast of Brooklyn, then Fort Warren in Boston.

He wrote a book on his experiences as a political prisoner completed in December 1862 and published in 1863 titled Fourteen Months in American Bastiles, two of the publishers selling the book were then arrested. Howard commented on his imprisonment,

When I looked out in the morning, I could not help being struck by an odd and not pleasant coincidence. On that day forty-seven years before my grandfather, Mr. Francis Scott Key, then prisoner on a British ship, had witnessed the bombardment of Fort McHenry. When on the following morning the hostile fleet drew off, defeated, he wrote the song so long popular throughout the country, "The Star-Spangled Banner". As I stood upon the very scene of that conflict, I could not but contrast my position with his, forty-seven years before. The flag which he had then so proudly hailed, I saw waving at the same place over the victims of as vulgar and brutal a despotism as modern times have witnessed.

Howard died while in London in 1872.

== Background ==
Maryland was considered one of the five border states at the outbreak of the U.S. Civil War. On April 27, 1861 Lincoln suspended the writ of habeas corpus in Maryland partially as a response to the Baltimore riot of 1861, and in portions of midwestern states such as southern Indiana.

The first person to be arrested after this order was issued was Lieutenant John Merryman of the newly formed (1861) Baltimore County Horse Guards, a unit composed of southern sympathizers. Merryman was accused of treason for destroying bridges and telegraph wires to prevent Union troops from marching through Baltimore to reinforce Washington, D.C.

Lincoln's action was challenged in court and overturned by the U.S. Circuit Court in Maryland (led by Supreme Court Chief Justice Roger B. Taney, who was incidentally married to Anne Phoebe Charlton Key, Francis Scott Key's sister) in Ex Parte Merryman, 17 F. Cas. 144 (C.C.D. Md. 1861). Lincoln, citing the actions of prior U.S. President Andrew Jackson, chose to ignore the ruling. It was for criticizing Lincoln's actions in the editorial section of the Baltimore Exchange that Howard was arrested. In all of the 14 months that he was a prisoner, he was never given a trial, or told what his “crime” was.
