= Taney Arrest Warrant =

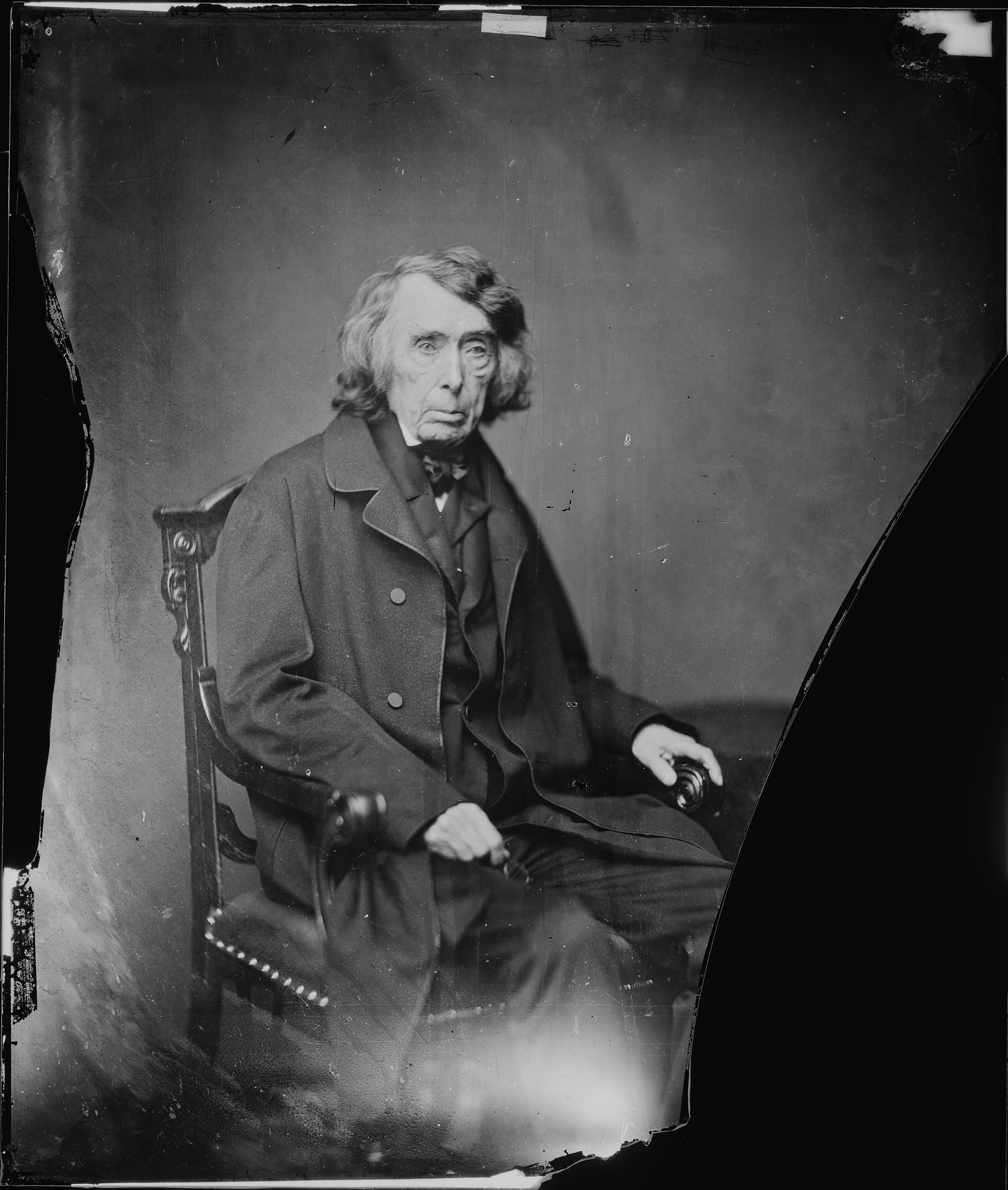
Roger B. Taney photo by Mathew Brady

The Taney Arrest Warrant is a conjectural controversy in Abraham Lincoln scholarship. The argument is that in late May or early June 1861, President Lincoln secretly ordered an arrest warrant for Roger B. Taney, the Chief Justice of the United States, but abandoned the proposal. The arrest order is said to have been in response to Taney's ruling in Ex parte Merryman, which found Lincoln's suspension of the writ of habeas corpus to be unconstitutional.

As historian Brian McGinty concludes, if there was such a plan to arrest Taney it would have been both reckless and inflammatory on Lincoln's part, for it would have dramatically escalated political tensions. McGinty, like Lincoln's major biographers, concludes there never was any arrest warrant.^{p.76-77}

== History and evidence ==
The single primary source document is a manuscript written in the 1880s by Ward Hill Lamon, Lincoln's friend, bodyguard, and United States Marshal for the District of Columbia during his administration. According to the manuscript, which is a brief history of Ex Parte Merryman by Lamon:

After due consideration the administration determined upon the arrest of the Chief Justice. A warrant or order was issued for his arrest. Then arose the question of service. Who should make the arrest and where should the imprisonment be? This was done by the President with instructions to use his own discretion about making the arrest unless he should receive further orders from him.

The warrant was never served, according to Lamon, for reasons that are not given. The manuscript dates from the 1880s and resides in the collection of Lamon papers at the Huntington Library.

Taney's own memoir, completed from his unfinished autobiography by Samuel Tyler in 1872, refers to the Chief Justice's fears of arrest. According to Tyler, as Taney "left the house of his son-in-law, Mr. Campbell" en route to his courtroom "remarked that it was likely he should be imprisoned in Fort McHenry before night, but that he was going to Court to do his duty."^{p. 74}

Lamon's story emerged during the early 1970s in A More Perfect Union by Harold Hyman. Some recent writers have accepted the story as credible including Jeffrey Rogers Hummel in Emancipating Slaves, Enslaving Free Men. For a time in the 1980s and 1990s, it was believed that a second corroborating document by Francis Lieber referred to the warrant. This was the result of a mistaken numerical citation in an earlier work. The error was discovered by John Rodehamel, a manuscripts librarian at the Huntington Library. Once informed of this error, Jeffrey Hummel described Lamon's unsupported account as "not credible." That President Lincoln considered, and then rejected, the possibility of arresting Taney is briefly mentioned in The Civil War produced by Ken Burns and aired on Public Broadcasting Service (PBS) public television stations.

== Controversy ==
One criticism is that Lamon is an unreliable source, remembered for lending his name to a ghost-written 1872 biography of Lincoln by Chauncey Black. The biography was received unfavorably by Robert Todd Lincoln, the president's son, and was denounced for a lack of discretion. On the other hand, the habeas corpus manuscript was written in the mid-1880s, around the time Lamon was working on his second book, Recollections of Abraham Lincoln, which was incomplete when he died (Lamon's daughter edited the completed portions of it for posthumous publication.) This second book is highly regarded among Lincoln scholars and is the main source for many well-known Lincoln anecdotes and quotes. The Taney warrant story does not appear in this second book.

Another criticism is that no copy of the warrant or other documentation has been found to support Lamon's story.

During Lincoln's administration several prominent political adversaries were arrested, including Congressman Clement Vallandigham, a leading Copperhead, and at least one other federal judge – William Matthew Merrick of the United States Circuit Court for the District of Columbia – was placed under house arrest for defying the suspension. Several northern newspapers also publicly called for Taney's arrest after the Merryman ruling.
