= John Merryman =

American politician (1824-1881)

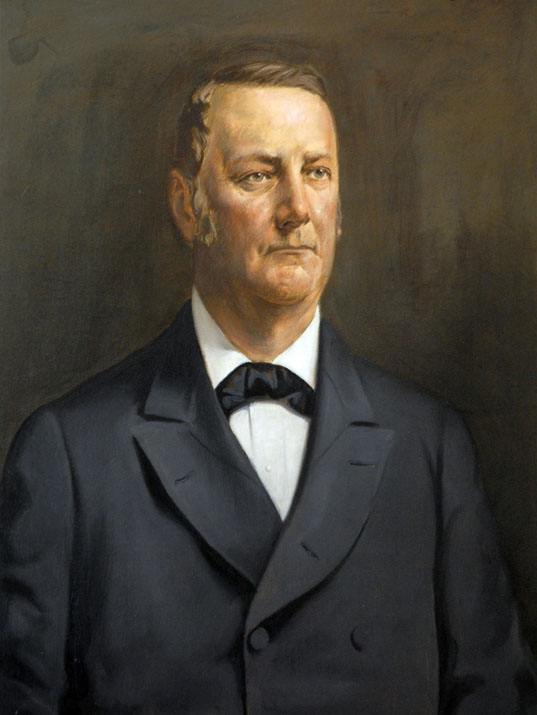
- Oil on canvas attributed to Meredith Janvier, c. 1910-1920

Treasurer of Maryland
- In office 1870–1872
- Preceded by: Robert Fowler
- Succeeded by: John Davis

Personal details
- Born: August 9, 1824
- Died: November 15, 1881 (aged 57)
- Party: Democratic
- Spouse: Ann Louisa Gittings

John Merryman (August 9, 1824 – November 15, 1881) of Baltimore County, Maryland, was arrested in May 1861 during the American Civil War for recruiting men to fight for the Confederate States of America.

Maryland was a slave state which had not seceded but had instead stayed in the Union. Still, its Eastern Shore had a plantation-based economy and was greatly sympathetic to the South, and Baltimore was a hotbed of secessionist activity, including a supposed plot to kill Abraham Lincoln on the way to his inauguration, and a deadly riot when soldiers from Massachusetts marched through the city on their way to Washington, D.C.

Because of these events, and others, Lincoln had invoked his Constitutional right to suspend habeas corpus in the case of a rebellion, and had passed along that authority to officers of the Union Army in Maryland.

Merryman was held prisoner in Fort McHenry in Baltimore and was the petitioner in the case "Ex parte Merryman" which was one of the best known habeas corpus cases of the American Civil War (1861–1865). Merryman was arrested for his involvement in the mob in Baltimore, specifically for his leadership in the destruction of telegraph lines, but was not charged, a right normally ensured by the writ of habeas corpus. The case was taken up by the federal circuit court and its current presiding judge who happened to be Chief Justice Roger B. Taney, a Democratic-leaning Marylander.

The reading of Article 1, Section 9 of the U.S. Constitution was in question. Taney believed that the phrase "when in cases of rebellion or invasion the public safety may require it" applied solely to Congress because of its location in Article 1. In Ex parte Merryman, Taney wrote, "If the high power over the liberty of the citizens now claimed was intended to be conferred on the President, it would undoubtedly be found in plain words in this article (Article I of the Constitution) … He certainly does not faithfully execute the laws if he takes upon himself legislative power by suspending the writ of habeas corpus." Lincoln asserted that his "war powers" gave him authority to act on this power to preserve the Union, especially since Congress could not be in session to suspend the writ. Lincoln completely ignored Taney's ruling thereby invoking nonacquiescence, and later asked Congress when they reconvened for a special session on July 4, 1861, "Are all the laws, but one, to go unexecuted, and the government itself go to pieces, lest that one be violated?" Not anticipating Taney's final order in Merryman to not actually order Cadwalader (the actual defendant), the Army, Lincoln or his administration, or anyone else to release John Merryman, and accordingly perceiving the destruction of public property as being sanctioned in Maryland, Lincoln would have been unable to fend off the seceding states' armies. Thus, he concludes that suspending the writ of habeas corpus was essential to preserving the government. The executive branch could not enforce laws in such circumstances.

The case never reached the Supreme Court, partly because in 1861 Congress passed a law which "approved and in all respects legalized and made valid ... all the acts, proclamations, and orders of the President of the United States respecting the army and navy ... as if they had been done under the previous express authority and direction of the Congress."

Merryman was also a state militia officer during the Civil War, and a Maryland politician.

== Life and career ==
=== Early life ===
Merryman began his work life as an employee in Richard Norris' hardware store in Baltimore City. The following year he moved to Guayama, Puerto Rico to work for his uncle, Samuel N. Gott. Merryman returned to Maryland in 1842 to manage farms and raise Hereford cattle. Merryman married Ann Louisa, daughter of Elijah Bosley Gittings, in 1844. John and Ann Louisa had eleven children. Merryman, a Democrat, served as member and president of the Board of County Commissioners, Baltimore County, in 1857. At the outbreak of the Civil War in April 1861, he was a farmer in Cockeysville, Maryland.

=== Civil War ===
Prior to the Civil War, Merryman was a 3rd lieutenant in the Baltimore County Troops. By 1861 he was a 1st lieutenant in the Baltimore County Horse Guards. Following the Pratt Street Riot in Baltimore, the Maryland legislature voted against secession. However, concerned about further unrest from pro-Southern elements, they voted to keep the railways closed so Union troops could not travel through Maryland on their way to defending Washington, D.C. and other federal enclaves. While carrying out this policy, Governor Thomas Holliday Hicks allegedly ordered Merryman to aid in the destruction of several bridges north of Baltimore.

On May 25, 1861, Merryman was arrested at his home in Cockeysville by Union troops acting under orders of General William H. Keim. Merryman was then taken and confined in Fort McHenry. Merryman petitioned for a writ of habeas corpus, which was granted, in part, by Chief Justice Roger B. Taney. Taney's May 26, 1861 order directed General George Cadwalader, commander of Fort McHenry, (1) to produce (but not release) Merryman for a hearing before Taney to be held the very next day, on May 27, 1861, and (2) to explain on what legal basis the Army had seized Merryman. General George Cadwalader did not produce Merryman. Instead, Cadwalader delivered a response which was read to the court. Cadwalader's response explained that he was acting under orders from Lincoln, who had delegated authority to the military to suspend habeas corpus. Because Cadwalader failed to produce Merryman, Taney cited Cadwalader for contempt, and ordered the U.S. Marshal to serve an attachment order on Cadwalader. The U.S. Marshal was unable to serve the attachment order, as he was denied entrance to Fort McHenry. Thus, the contempt citation was never adjudicated. Furthermore, Taney declared Lincoln's suspension of habeas corpus unconstitutional (see Ex parte Merryman).

While Merryman was in jail awaiting a hearing, Taney had furniture and home-cooked meals brought to him in his cell. Merryman later named one of his sons Roger B. Taney Merryman in the Chief Justice's honor.

Merryman was State Treasurer of Maryland from 1870 to 1872.

== See also ==
- Taney Arrest Warrant
- Hampton NHS, 19th century

== Footnotes ==
Political offices
Preceded by Robert Fowler	Treasurer of Maryland; 1870—1872	Succeeded by John W. Davis
