= Ex parte Merryman =

United States legal case

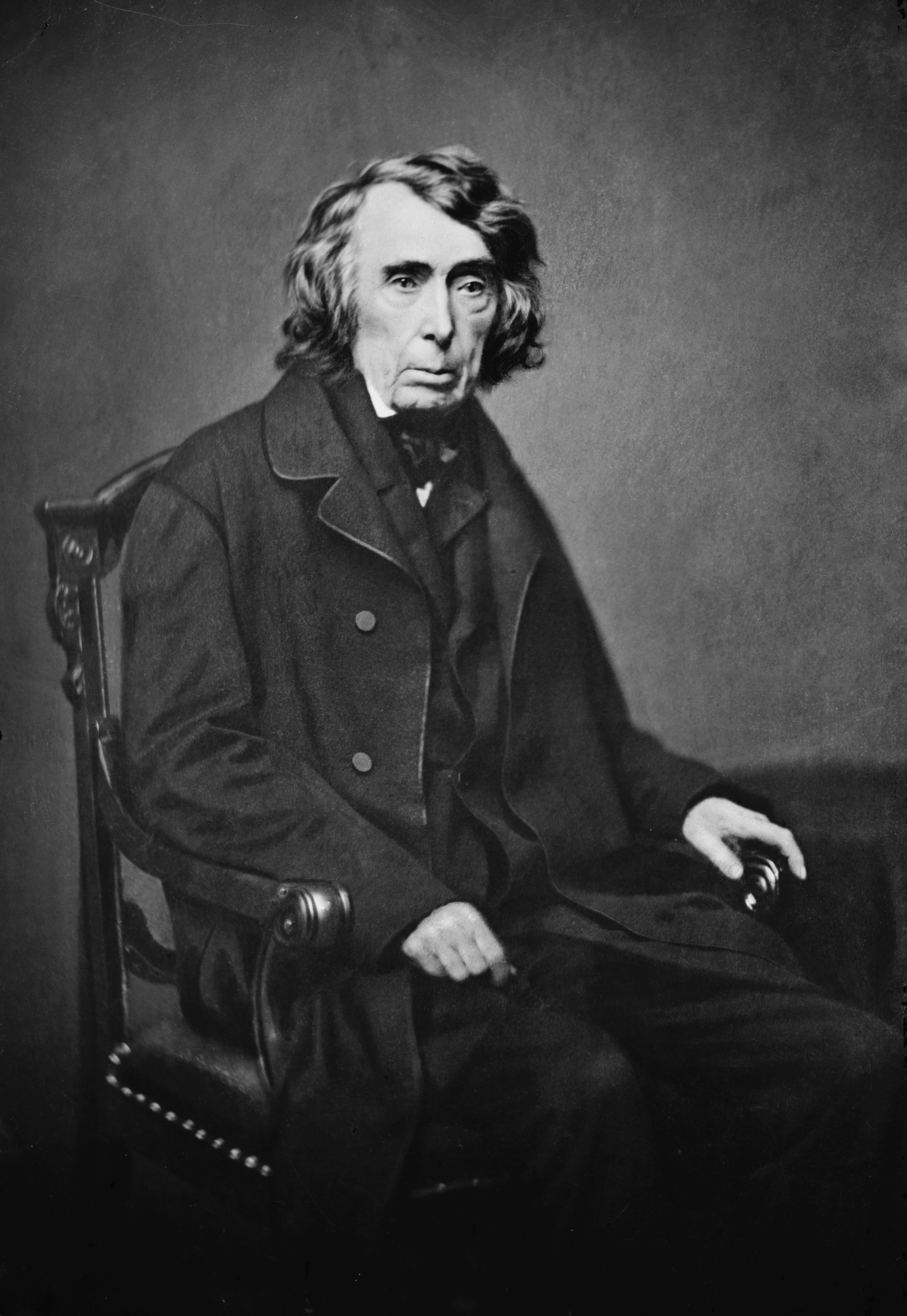
Chief Justice Roger B. Taney issued the ruling in Ex parte Merryman.

Ex parte Merryman, 17 F. Cas. 144 (C.C.D. Md. 1861) (No. 9487), was a controversial U.S. federal court case during the American Civil War. It was a test of the authority of the President to suspend "the privilege of the writ of habeas corpus" under the Constitution's Suspension Clause, when Congress was in recess and therefore unavailable to do so itself. Generally, the case raised questions about the ability of the executive branch to decline to enforce judicial decisions when the executive believes them to be erroneous and harmful to its own legal powers.

John Merryman was a prominent planter from Baltimore County, Maryland, who had been arrested at his rural plantation for destroying railroad bridges on which Union troops were traveling. Held prisoner in Fort McHenry in Baltimore harbor, he was kept incommunicado to judicial and to civilian legal authorities. While riding circuit, Chief Justice Roger B. Taney ruled that the authority to suspend habeas corpus lay exclusively with Congress.

Taney filed the Merryman decision with the United States Circuit Court for the District of Maryland, but it is unclear whether Taney's decision was a circuit court decision. One view, based in part on Taney's handwritten copy of his decision in Merryman, is that Taney heard the habeas action under special authority granted to federal judges by Section 14 of the Judiciary Act of 1789. According to this view, Merryman was an in-chambers opinion. Due to its vague jurisdictional locus and hastened disposition, aspects of the Merryman decision remain contested.

The executive branch, including the United States Army, under the authority of the President of the United States as Commander-in-Chief, did not comply with the Merryman decision. Weeks later, Merryman was released on bail without further prosecution. In 1863, Congress passed the Habeas Corpus Suspension Act to cure the constitutional defect.

== Background ==
When a person is detained by police or other authority, a court can issue a writ of habeas corpus, compelling the detaining authority either to show proper cause for detaining the person (e.g., by filing criminal charges) or to release the detainee. The court can remand the prisoner to custody, release them on bail, or release them outright. Article I, Section 9 of the United States Constitution, which prescribes and limits the power of Congress, includes the Suspension Clause:

The Privilege of the Writ of Habeas Corpus shall not be suspended, unless when in Cases of Rebellion or Invasion the public Safety may require it.

In April 1861, when combat erupted in the Civil War, President Abraham Lincoln called for the states to provide militia troops to the Federal government to suppress the rebellion. Troops traveling to Washington passed through Baltimore, Maryland. Baltimore mobs objecting to a war with the seceding states attacked some of the troop transports on April 19. It seemed possible that Maryland would attempt to block the passage of troops, cutting off Washington and impeding a war against the South.

On April 29, the Maryland legislature voted 53–13 against secession, but it also voted not to reopen rail links with the North. It requested that Lincoln remove the growing number of federal troops from Maryland. At this time the legislature appeared to want to avoid involvement in a war with its southern neighbors. Fearful that the transport of more Union troops through the city and state would provoke more rioting, and possibly in an attempt to enact secession by extralegal means, Mayor George Brown of Baltimore and Governor Thomas Hicks of Maryland asked that no more troops cross Maryland, but Lincoln refused. For the next few weeks, troops were transported to Washington via Annapolis, avoiding Baltimore. Also on April 19, Lincoln asked Attorney General Edward Bates for an opinion on the suspension of the writ of habeas corpus.

The threat to the capital was serious, and Lincoln responded by delegating limited authority to the Army to suspend habeas corpus in Maryland. On April 27, 1861, he told General Winfield Scott (commanding general of the Army) that if there was any resistance on the "military line" from Annapolis to Washington, Scott or "the officer in command at the point" was authorized to suspend habeas corpus if necessary.

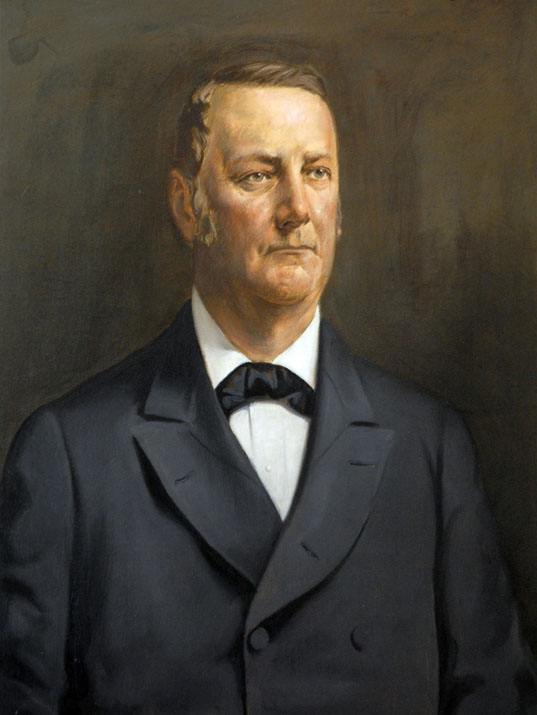
John Merryman. Oil on canvas attributed to Meredith Janvier, c. 1910–1920

Following the Maryland legislature's April 29 directive that Maryland not be used as a passage for troops attacking the South, Governor Hicks allegedly ordered the state militia to demolish several state railroad bridges (at Bush River and Gunpowder River). Militia Lieutenant John Merryman was arrested on May 25 by order of Brigadier General William High Keim of the United States Volunteers, for his role in destroying the bridges. Merryman was charged with treason and being a commissioned lieutenant in an organization intending armed hostility toward the government.

In another Maryland habeas corpus case, just prior to Merryman, Judge William Fell Giles of the United States District Court for the District of Maryland issued a writ of habeas corpus, which was ignored by the commander of Fort McHenry, Major William W. Morris.

Rather than approaching Judge Giles, Merryman's lawyers went to Washington, D.C., and asked Chief Justice Taney to issue a writ of habeas corpus. Taney promptly issued the writ on Merryman's behalf on May 26, 1861; Taney ordered General George Cadwalader, the commander of the military district including Fort McHenry, where Merryman was being held, to bring Merryman before Taney the next day. Taney's order directed Cadwalader only to produce Merryman at court, not to release him. During that era, Supreme Court Justices sat as circuit court judges, as well. It is unclear if Taney was acting in his role as a circuit judge for the United States Circuit Court for the District of Maryland, or making use of special authority to hear habeas matters permitted to all federal judges, including the Chief Justice, under Section 14 of the Judiciary Act of 1789.

Taney stated that he held court on this matter in Maryland, rather than Washington, D.C., in order to permit Gen. Cadwalader to answer the writ in Baltimore rather than the capital, and so not to have to leave the limits of his military command.

Cadwalader, although a lawyer, had less than one day to draft a response and defense for his conduct and that of the Army. Cadwalader responded to Taney's order on May 27 by sending a colonel to explain that the Army had suspended the writ of habeas corpus under presidential authority. Cadwalader also provided a letter explaining the circumstances of Merryman's arrest, including that Merryman was arrested by Keim's subordinates for treason, and for being illegally in possession of U.S. arms, and for advocating "armed hostility against the Government". The letter declared that the public safety was still threatened and that any errors "should be on the side of safety to the country". Because of the serious nature of the charges and complexity of the issues, Cadwalader requested an extension to reply in order to get further instructions from the President.

Taney refused the request and instead held Cadwalader in contempt of court for refusing to produce Merryman. Accordingly, Taney issued a writ of attachment for Cadwalader, ordering a U.S. Marshal to seize Cadwalader and bring him before the court the following day.

Cadwalader had been sent instructions on May 28, 1861, from Army headquarters explicitly acknowledging issuance of the writ by Taney and ordering Cadwalader, under the President's authority, to keep Merryman in custody. On that same day, the executive branch – namely, a U.S. Marshal – attempted to execute Taney's writ of attachment, but the marshal was refused entry into the fort. There is no concrete documentation that Cadwalader had received those instructions prior to the Marshal's being refused entry at Fort McHenry. Because the Marshal was unable to serve the attachment, the citation for contempt was never adjudicated. At the end of the Merryman litigation, it became a nullity, as do all civil contempt orders at the termination of litigation.

== Decision ==
On May 28, Taney stated from the bench that the President can neither suspend habeas corpus nor authorize a military officer to do it, and that military officers cannot arrest a person not subject to the rules and articles of war, except as ordered by the courts. Taney noted that, while the marshal had the right to call up the posse comitatus to assist him in seizing General Cadwalader and in bringing him before the court, it was probably unwise for the marshal to do so, as the civilian and military authorities might collide and violence ensue, and thus Taney would not punish the marshal for failing in his task. He then promised a more lengthy, written ruling within the week and ordered that it be sent to President Lincoln, "in order that he might perform his constitutional duty, to enforce the laws, by securing obedience to the process of the United States".

Critics of Taney believe that he was a partisan Democrat and an opponent of Lincoln and that his politics influenced his decision in Merryman. This criticism may have support in the fact that the Taney Court should have dismissed the Dred Scott case after finding "that the Court had no jurisdiction over Dred Scott's case because he was not a citizen" but instead chose to rule that the Missouri Compromise was unconstitutional despite that issue not being before the Court. In Merryman, Taney's decision to deny General Cadwalader time to consult the president and dispatch a US Marshal to arrest him during a Civil War and bring him before his court demonstrated partisan corruption on Taney's part. On the other hand, partisan Democrat or not, Taney's Merryman opinion was arguably a simple application of well-established law and consulting the president was irrelevant for General Cadwalader because Lincoln didn't have jurisdiction. Lincoln was also critical of Taney because of his ruling in the Dred Scott case. The case became historic because not only did President Lincoln refuse to comply with Taney's ruling, which does have precedent, but he directly violated it by continuing the suspension without congressional approval. It has never been squarely determined whether the president has any independent authority to suspend habeas corpus, or whether Lincoln's intentionally violating Taney's ruling without legal consequence stands as a precedent.

Taney filed his written opinion on June 1, 1861, with the United States Circuit Court for the District of Maryland. In it, he argued at length against Lincoln for granting himself easily abused powers. Taney's opinion was based in large part on the fact that the Suspension Clause is located in Article I, Section 9 of the Constitution, and "This article is devoted to the Legislative Department of the United States, and has not the slightest reference to the Executive Department". Taney also asserted that the President was not authorized to suspend habeas corpus because only Parliament, not the King, had such powers under English law. Referring to other provisions in the Bill of Rights, Taney wrote:

These great and fundamental laws, which Congress itself could not suspend, have been disregarded and suspended, like the writ of habeas corpus, by a military order, supported by force of arms. Such is the case now before me, and I can only say that if the authority which the Constitution has confided to the judiciary department and judicial officers, may thus, upon any pretext or under any circumstances, be usurped by the military power, at its discretion, the people of the United States are no longer living under a government of laws, but every citizen holds life, liberty and property at the will and pleasure of the army officer in whose military district he may happen to be found.

Taney noted in a footnote to the above passage that the United States Declaration of Independence listed making the military power independent of and superior to the civil power as one justification for dissolving political allegiance. The Declaration of Independence states, "He has affected to render the Military independent of and superior to the Civil power." Taney's opinion quoted an earlier opinion by Chief Justice John Marshall in the case of Ex parte Bollman:

If at any time the public safety should require the suspension of the powers vested by this act in the courts of the United States, it is for the Legislature to say so. That question depends on political considerations, on which the Legislature is to decide. Until the legislative will be expressed, this court can only see its duty, and must obey the laws.

Taney's final order in Merryman never actually ordered Cadwalader (the actual defendant), the Army, Lincoln or his administration, or anyone else to release John Merryman.

== Lincoln's rationale ==
The most common view is that the Lincoln administration did not comply with the rule of law by defying the Merryman opinion and thus Lincoln and his administration invoked nonacquiescence.

Merryman remained in custody while Congress remained in recess. Lincoln also received an opinion supporting his suspension from his Attorney General, Edward Bates. The Bates opinion (or a preliminary draft of that opinion) may have influenced Lincoln's subsequent message to Congress that discussed his administration's policy in regard to habeas corpus. However, Lincoln's message to Congress was dated July 4, 1861; the Bates opinion was dated the next day, July 5, 1861.

In his July 4, 1861 message to Congress, Lincoln said:

Now it is insisted that Congress, and not the Executive, is vested with this power. But the Constitution itself, is silent as to which, or who, is to exercise the power; and as the provision was plainly made for a dangerous emergency, it cannot be believed the framers of the instrument intended, that in every case, the danger should run its course, until Congress could be called together; the very assembling of which might be prevented, as was intended in this case, by the rebellion.

In the same message to Congress, Lincoln asked, "are all the laws, but one, to go unexecuted, and the government itself go to pieces, lest that one be violated?" Lincoln then suggested that Congress could legislate on the subject, and Congress did so, retroactively approving Lincoln's suspension of habeas corpus.

Although the consensus today is that only Congress can suspend habeas corpus, scholars, both during and after the war, largely sided with Lincoln's argument over Taney's. According to historian Michael Burlingame, "Lincoln had a good argument, for Congress in that era was often out of session, and an invasion or rebellion might well take place during one of its long recesses, just as had occurred in April."

== Historical context ==
In the month preceding the Merryman case, Baltimore Mayor Brown, the entire city council, the police commissioner, and the entire Board of Police, were arrested and imprisoned at Fort McHenry without charges, creating some controversy. In September after the Merryman ruling, and in disregard of it, the Army arrested sitting Democratic U.S. Congressman for Maryland Henry May, and fully one third of the members of the Maryland General Assembly, and expanded the geographical zone within which the writ of habeas corpus was suspended. When prominent Baltimore newspaper editor Frank Key Howard (Francis Scott Key's grandson) in a September editorial criticized Lincoln's failure to comply with Chief Justice Taney's Merryman opinion, Howard was himself arrested by Federal troops under orders from Lincoln's Secretary of State Seward and held without charge or trial. Howard described these events in his 1863 book Fourteen Months in American Bastiles, where he noted that he was imprisoned in Fort McHenry, the same fort where the Star Spangled Banner had been waving "o'er the land of the free" in his grandfather's song. Two of the publishers selling his book were then arrested. In all, nine newspapers were shut down in Maryland by the federal government, and a dozen newspaper owners and editors like Howard were imprisoned without charges.

In October 1861, one of them, John Murphy, asked the United States Circuit Court for the District of Columbia to issue a writ of habeas corpus for his son, then in the United States Army, on the grounds that he was underage. When the writ was delivered to General Andrew Porter Provost Marshal of the District of Columbia, he had both the lawyer delivering the writ and the United States Circuit Judge William Matthew Merrick, who issued the writ, arrested to prevent them from proceeding in the case United States ex rel. Murphy v. Porter. Merrick's fellow judges took up the case and ordered General Porter to appear before them, but Lincoln's Secretary of State Seward prevented the federal marshal from delivering the court order. The court objected that this disruption of its process was unconstitutional as the president had not declared martial law (while acknowledging that he had the power to do so) but noted that it was powerless to enforce its prerogatives.

In November 1861, Richard Bennett Carmichael, a presiding state circuit court judge in Maryland, was imprisoned without charge for releasing, due to his concern that arrests were arbitrary and civil liberties had been violated, many of the southern sympathizers seized in his jurisdiction. The order came from Secretary of State Seward. The federal troops executing Judge Carmichael's arrest beat him unconscious in his courthouse while his court was in session before dragging him out, initiating yet another public controversy.

In early 1862, Lincoln took a step back from the suspension of habeas corpus controversy. On February 14, he ordered most political prisoners released, with some exceptions (such as editor Howard), and offered them amnesty for past treason or disloyalty, so long as they did not aid the Confederacy.

== Aftermath ==
=== Indictment of Merryman ===
On July 10, by which time Congress was able to reconvene for a special session, Merryman was indicted for treason by a grand jury in Baltimore for the U.S. District Court for the District of Maryland. The indictment alleged that in cooperation with 500 armed men Merryman had "most wickedly, maliciously, and traitorously" waged war on the United States. He was charged with destroying six railroad bridges and the telegraph lines along the tracks, all with the intent to impede the passage of troops and obstruct vital military communications. Thirteen witnesses to the actions were listed. Seven other men were indicted along with Merryman. On July 13, he was released pending trial upon the posting $20,000 bail.

The case never came to trial. Since treason was a capital offense, it had to be tried in the circuit court. For Maryland-related alleged crimes, this meant that Taney and District Judge William F. Giles would both hear the case, as they were the only two federal judges for the United States Circuit Court for the District of Maryland. Taney consistently refused to schedule hearings for any of those charged, claiming that he believed they would not receive a fair trial in Maryland during wartime conditions. He also discouraged Judge Giles from hearing the case by himself and resisted efforts to have another Justice replace him (part of his delay was blamed on poor health). As the refusal continued into 1864, Taney wrote to Justice Samuel Nelson that "I will not place the judicial power in this humiliating position nor consent to degrade and disgrace it, and if the district attorney presses the prosecutions I shall refuse to take them up." Salmon P. Chase, nominated by President Lincoln and succeeding Taney as Chief Justice and circuit judge for Maryland, also delayed hearing Merryman and other similar Maryland treason cases.

=== Congressional response ===
After reconvening in July, Congress failed to pass a bill favored by Lincoln to explicitly approve his habeas corpus suspensions and to authorize the administration to continue them. The administration would continue the arrests, regardless, with a new wave of arrests beginning in Maryland in September 1861. However, in the summer of 1861, Congress did adopt more general retroactive language rendering Lincoln's previous actions during the spring "in all respects legalized".

In March 1862 U.S. Congressman Henry May (D-Maryland), who had been imprisoned in the new wave of arrests and held without charges from September 1861 to December 1861, introduced a bill requiring the federal government either to indict by grand jury or release all other "political prisoners" still held without habeas corpus. May's bill passed the House in summer 1862, and its position would later be included in the Habeas Corpus Suspension Act 1863, which would require actual indictments for suspected traitors.

Several months later, faced with opposition to his calling up of the militia, Lincoln again suspended habeas corpus in the entire country and made anyone charged with interfering with the draft, discouraging enlistments, or aiding the Confederacy subject to martial law. In the interim, the controversy continued with several calls made for prosecution of those who acted under Lincoln's suspension of habeas corpus. Former Secretary of War Simon Cameron had even been arrested in connection with a suit for trespass vi et armis, assault and battery, and false imprisonment.

In February 1863, former Maryland Governor Hicks who had requested that Lincoln not transport troops through the state was now a U.S. Senator, and claimed: "I believe that arrests and arrests alone saved the State of Maryland not only from greater degradation than she suffered, but from everlasting destruction. ... I approved them [the arrests] then, and I approve them now; and the only thing for which I condemn the Administration in regard to that matter is that they let some of these men out."

The passage of the Habeas Corpus Suspension Act in March 1863 finally ended the controversy, at least temporarily, by authorizing presidential suspension of the writ, but requiring indictment by grand jury (or release) of political prisoners, and by indemnifying federal officials who had arrested citizens in the previous two years. It has been argued that after this act was passed, Lincoln and his administration continued to arrest and hold prisoners without giving such prisoners the procedural protections mandated by the Act. In doing so, Lincoln and his administration relied wholly on presidential power claims.

=== Later discussion by courts ===
The rest of the U.S. Supreme Court had nothing to do with Merryman, and the other two justices from the South, John Catron and James Moore Wayne, acted as Unionists. For instance, Catron's charge to a Saint Louis grand jury, saying that armed resistance to the federal government was treason, was quoted in the New York Tribune of July 14, 1861. On circuit, Catron closely cooperated with military authorities.

Several district and circuit court rulings followed Taney's opinion. However, according to historian Harold Hyman, most northern lawyers accepted Lincoln's view that Taney's opinion in Merryman was "ultimately reversible by political processes", and Taney's opinion in that case "convinced no other justices and few lower federal judges". However, Taney's Merryman opinion was adopted by some lower courts, such as the United States District Court for the Southern District of New York and the Supreme Court of Wisconsin. See, e.g., Ex parte McQuillon, 16 F. Cas. 347, 348 (S.D.N.Y. 1861) (No. 8294) (Betts, J.) ("[Judge Betts] would, however, follow out that case [Merryman], but would express no opinion whatever, as it would be indecorous on his part to oppose the [C]hief [J]ustice. He would therefore decline taking any action on the writ at all."); In re Kemp, 16 Wis. 359, 1863 WL 1066, at *8 (1863) (Dixon, C.J.) ("I deem it advisable, adhering to the precedent set by other courts and judges under like circumstances, and out of respect to the national authorities, to withhold [granting habeas relief] until they shall have had time to consider what steps they should properly take in the case"). Just as Taney chose not to grant John Merryman relief at the termination of litigation, Betts and Dixon also refused to grant the litigants before them, who were situated similar to Merryman, released from imprisonment.

The Merryman decision is still among the best-known Civil War-era court cases and one of Taney's most famous opinions, alongside the Dred Scott case. Its legal argument holding that Congress alone may suspend the writ was restated by Justice Antonin Scalia in a dissenting opinion, joined by Justice John Paul Stevens, in the case of Hamdi v. Rumsfeld. In that case, Scalia and Stevens also described a time-limited exception to the habeas corpus right:

Where the commitment was for felony or high treason, the [Habeas Corpus Act 1679] did not require immediate release, but instead required the Crown to commence criminal proceedings within a specified time ... [T]he practical effect of this provision was that imprisonment without indictment or trial for felony or high treason under §7 would not exceed approximately three to six months.

The Hamdi case, though, did not involve any suspension of the writ, much less a suspension by the President while Congress was unavailable, and no U.S. Supreme Court decision has ever squarely endorsed or rejected Taney's opinion in Merryman.

=== Scholarly reactions during the Civil War ===
An 1862 essay by Horace Binney criticized Taney's treatment of the earlier Bollman opinion by Chief Justice Marshall. According to Binney, "there was nothing before Chief Justice [Marshall] to raise the distinction between Congress and the President" and in any event those lines by Chief Justice Marshall were "altogether" obiter dicta.

Sidney George Fisher wrote the only full-length book on the Constitution during the Civil War that was published during the war itself. Regarding Merryman, Fisher's treatise looked to practice in the mother country:

The Habeas Corpus Act can only be suspended by Parliament; but in the absence of Parliament, or even when Parliament is in session, and the case demanded instant and secret action, the Ministers of the Crown, when the public safety has, in their opinion, required it, have habitually taken the responsibility of suspending the benefits or privilege of the writ. When Parliament meet, they immediately ask for a bill of indemnity, and also for a suspension of the act itself, should the danger continue. The consent of Parliament is therefore required for any invasion of personal liberty, either before or after such invasion, has always been asked since the statute of 31 Charles II, and has always been granted.

Even before Fisher's book came out in 1862, scholars were disputing Taney's assertion that Article I of the Constitution "has not the slightest reference to the Executive Department". For example, an October 1861 article in the University of Pennsylvania Law Review (then called The American Law Register) pointed out that Article I, Section 9 (where the Suspension Clause is located) includes the Appropriations Clause, the bills of which not being subject to a Presidential absolute veto, nonetheless pertains to the executive branch.

Sidney George Fisher had a son Sydney George Fisher who compiled a list of 43 pamphlets or the like on the habeas corpus question that had been published during the Civil War.

== See also ==
- Nonacquiescence
- United States ex rel. Murphy v. Porter (1861)
- Ex parte Milligan (1866)
- Habeas corpus in the United States
- Taney Arrest Warrant
- Maryland in the Civil War
