= Thomas Holliday Hicks =

American politician (1798-1865)

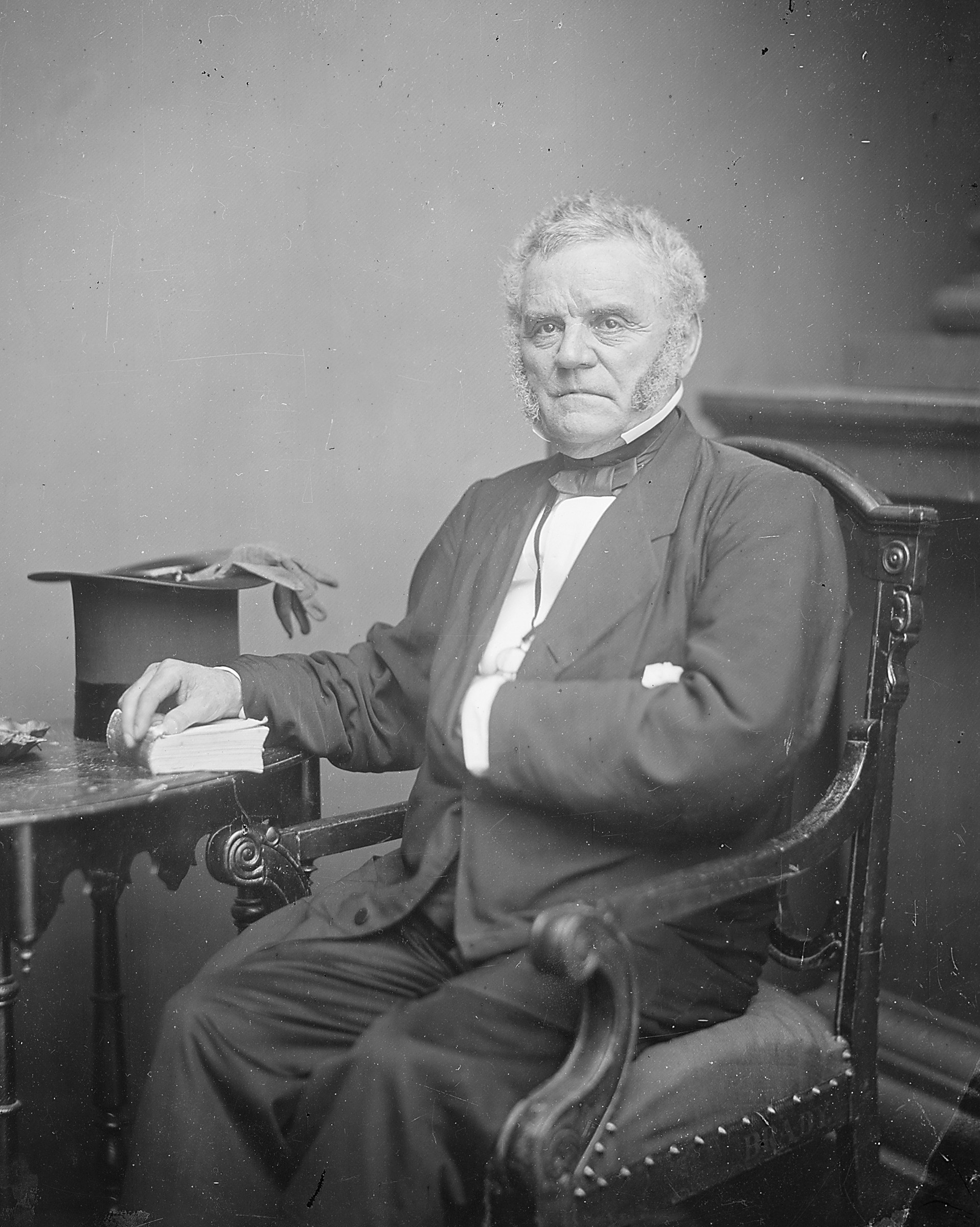
- Hicks, c. 1860–1865

United States Senator from Maryland
- In office December 29, 1862 – February 14, 1865
- Preceded by: James A. Pearce
- Succeeded by: John A. J. Creswell

31st Governor of Maryland
- In office January 13, 1858 – January 8, 1862
- Preceded by: Thomas W. Ligon
- Succeeded by: Augustus Bradford

Maryland House of Delegates
- In office 1829 – 1830, 1836

Personal details
- Born: September 2, 1798 East New Market, Maryland, US
- Died: February 14, 1865 (aged 66) Washington, D.C., US
- Party: Democratic (1830–35); Whig (1835–54); American (1854–60); Constitutional Union (1860–61); Union (1861–65)
- Spouses: Ann Thompson; Leah A. Raleigh; Jane Eliza McNamara Wilcox
- Children: 5
- National Governors Association, Governor's Information, Maryland Governor Thomas Holliday Hicks

Thomas Holliday Hicks (September 2, 1798 – February 14, 1865) was an American politician who served as the Governor and Senator of Maryland during the American Civil War. As governor, opposing the Democrats, his views accurately reflected the conflicting local loyalties. He was pro-slavery but anti-secession. Under pressure to call the General Assembly into special session, he held it in the pro-Union town of Frederick, where he was able to keep the state from seceding to join the Confederacy.

In December 1862, Hicks was appointed to the U.S. Senate, where he endorsed Abraham Lincoln's re-election in 1864.

== Early career ==
Born in 1798 near East New Market, Maryland, Hicks began his political career as a Democrat when he was elected town constable and then, in 1824, elected Sheriff of Dorchester County. Later, he switched to the Whig Party and was elected to the House of Delegates in 1830 and re-elected in 1836.

In 1837, the legislature elected him a member of the Governor's Council, the last to be chosen before that body was abolished. In 1838, he was appointed Register of Wills for Dorchester County. He stayed in that job until his election as governor.

== Governor of Maryland ==
In 1857, as the Whig Party disintegrated, Hicks joined the Native American Party, more commonly known as the Know-Nothing Party. As such, in 1858, he ran for governor and defeated Democrat John Charles Groome by 8,700 votes. The election, however, was notable for fraud, open intimidation of voters, and unprecedented violence. Hicks was one of the oldest men to become governor.

In his gubernatorial inaugural address, Hicks criticized the numbers of foreign immigrants coming to America and warned that they would "change the national character".

=== Slavery and the coming of war ===
Hicks opposed abolitionists and supported slave owners. He denounced "[t]he attacks of fanatical and misguided persons against property in slaves" and added that slave owners had a right under the "[United States] Constitution to recover their property." Hicks belatedly supported the Union of the states and sought to prevent Maryland from seceding and joining the Confederacy. This would have isolated Washington, D.C., in Confederate territory.

Hicks reflected the divisions in his state. In Hicks' writings about the South and its secession, he referred to it as "we." He wrote that "they", the North (and Abraham Lincoln), were wrong in "refus[ing] to observe the plain requirements of the Constitution" to permit new states to join the Union as slave states.

=== Baltimore Riot of 1861 ===
After the bloodshed in Baltimore, involving Massachusetts troops which were fired on while marching between railroad stations, on April 19, 1861, Baltimore Mayor George William Brown, Marshal George P. Kane, and former Governor Enoch Louis Lowe requested that Hicks burn the railroad bridges leading to Baltimore, in order to prevent further troops from entering the state. Hicks reportedly approved this proposal. These actions were addressed in Ex parte Merryman, the famous case of Maryland militia Captain John Merryman who was arrested by Union forces.

After initially denying that he had authorized such actions, Hicks backtracked and voiced his support for the Union. But, writing to Lincoln on April 22, 1861, Hicks informed the new president that "I feel it my duty most respectfully to advise you that no more troops be ordered or allowed to pass through Maryland", requested that Lincoln obtain a truce with the South and suggested that Sir Richard Lyons mediate. Hicks worried about Maryland's position as a border state. In an address to the Maryland General Assembly on April 25, 1861, he stated that "The only safety of Maryland lies in preserving a neutral position between our brethren of the North and of the South."

Subsequently, many prominent men lobbied Hicks to call the General Assembly into special session, purportedly for the mixed reason of opposing secession and opposing the Northern attitude towards the South. The Assembly normally met in Annapolis, but that city was occupied by Union troops, so Hicks changed the location to Frederick, a generally pro-Union town. The Assembly convened in Frederick, and unanimously agreed that it did not have the power to commit the state to secession. On April 29, the Assembly voted 53–13 against calling a state convention which would have that power.

== Late career and death ==
In December 1862, his successor as governor, Augustus W. Bradford, appointed him to the U.S. Senate from Maryland following the death of his predecessor, James A. Pearce (D). Although ill, he campaigned for election to finish the term, winning on January 11, 1864 while endorsing Lincoln's reelection in 1864. He died at the Metropolitan Hotel in Washington, D.C., on February 14, 1865. Abraham Lincoln attended his funeral in the U.S. Senate Chamber.

Hicks was originally buried at his family farm in Dorchester County. He was later disinterred and moved to Cambridge Cemetery. The state erected a monument over his grave in 1868.

== See also ==
- Henry Winter Davis
- Ex parte Merryman
- James Morrison Harris
- Anthony Kennedy (Maryland politician)
- John P. Kennedy
- Maryland in the American Civil War
- James Barroll Ricaud
- List of members of the United States Congress who died in office (1790–1899)

== Notes ==
Party political offices
First	Know Nothing nominee for Governor of Maryland; 1857	Succeeded by Thomas Swann
Political offices
Preceded by Thomas W. Ligon	Governor of Maryland; 1858–1862	Succeeded by Augustus Bradford
U.S. Senate
Preceded by James A. Pearce	U.S. senator (Class 3) from Maryland; December 29, 1862 – February 14, 1865; Served alongside: Anthony Kennedy and Reverdy Johnson	Succeeded by John A. J. Creswell
