= United States ex rel. Murphy v. Porter =

1861 US Circuit Court case

United States ex rel. Murphy v. Porter, 2 Hawy. & H. 394, 27 F. Cas. 599, was a case decided by the United States Circuit Court for the District of Columbia in October 1861.

== Background and noncompliance with court order ==
The case arose when John Murphy asked the court to issue a writ of habeas corpus to release his son from service in the United States Army during the Civil War on the grounds that he was underage. The case was decided at a time when habeas corpus had been suspended in the District of Columbia. General Andrew Porter, to whom the writ was directed, arrested Murphy's lawyer when he attempted to serve Porter with the writ, and Porter also had Judge William Matthew Merrick placed under house arrest in order to prevent him from proceeding in the case.

Merrick's fellow judges took up the case and ordered Gen. Porter to appear before them and explain himself, but President Abraham Lincoln prevented the marshal from delivering the court's order. John Hay was Lincoln's personal secretary. Hay recounts in his diary that Deputy U.S. Marshal George Philips approached Hay and Secretary of State William H. Seward to ask what should be done with the court order regarding Porter. Seward replied: "The President ... forbids you to serve any process upon any officer here." Hay confirmed that those were "Precisely his words."

The court objected that this disruption of its process was unconstitutional, as the president had not declared martial law (while acknowledging that he did have the power to do so). The court noted that it was powerless to enforce its prerogatives.

== Aftermath ==
On March 3, 1863, Congress abolished the circuit court, district court, and criminal court of the District of Columbia, and replaced them with the Supreme Court of the District of Columbia. This resulted in the removal of judges from the bench who had ruled against the US in United States ex rel. Murphy v. Porter.

Opponents of the reorganization declared that its sole purpose was to remove those judges from the bench, since it gave to the new court all the powers and jurisdiction of the old ones, something its supporters strenuously denied. Supporter Sen. Henry Wilson, however, while declaring that he had no desire to turn the judges out of office, said he had:

"not the greatest faith in the present judges. ... As to one of their judges, I mean Judge Merrick, I believe his heart is sweltering with treason. He has been under arrest since this rebellion broke out. I believe that during this session of Congress his home has been the resort where sympathizers with disloyal men have held councils, and secret councils, and I have good reason to believe this to be true."

== See also ==
- Ex parte Merryman
- Habeas corpus in the United States
