= Nonacquiescence =

Failure to comply with another government branch

In law, nonacquiescence is the intentional failure by one branch of the government to comply with the decision of another to some degree. It tends to arise only in governments that feature a strong separation of powers, such as in the United States, and is much rarer in governments where such powers are partly or wholly fused. Nonacquiescence may lead to a constitutional crisis, given certain critical situations and decisions.

== History ==
The issue of nonacquiescence first came to national prominence at the beginning of the American Civil War, in the famous case of Ex parte Merryman (1861). Merryman involved the executive branch's refusal to comply with a U.S. circuit court decision that President Abraham Lincoln's suspension of the writ of habeas corpus was invalid.

== Contemporary use ==
In the United States, federal agencies might practice nonacquiescence by refusing to accept the validity of unfavorable court decisions as binding precedent.

Both the Social Security Administration and the Internal Revenue Service have done so in response to certain court decisions.

The U.S. Internal Revenue Service (IRS) uses the term nonacquiescence in its actions on decision to indicate that the IRS disagrees with a court ruling and will not follow its precedent nationwide. In some cases of nonacquiescence, the IRS may follow the decision's precedent within the jurisdiction of the case in question, but not apply it in other jurisdictions.

Executive nonacquiescence has been heavily criticized by the federal courts, as well as the American Bar Association.

== See also ==
- Acquiescence, an unrelated legal term
