= 10th Maryland Volunteer Infantry Regiment =

- Active: June-July, 1863 - January 29, 1864
- Country: United States
- Allegiance: Union
- Branch: Union Army
- Type: Infantry
- Engagements: Battle of Charlestown (October 18, 1863)

Commanders
- Notable commanders: Colonel William H. Revere, Jr; Lieutenant Colonel William E. Ross; Major J. Townsend Deniel

The 10th Maryland Volunteer Infantry Regiment, also known as the 10th Maryland Infantry Regiment, was an infantry regiment that served with the Union army during the American Civil War. Organized in 1863, for six months' service, the regiment primarily conducted duty in the Upper Potomac, serving guard duty, and would drive Confederate forces out of Charleston, Virginia, alongside other Union units on October 18, 1863.

== Service ==
The regiment was organized and mustered into service at Baltimore, Maryland, from June to July, 1863, in response to President Abraham Lincoln's call of 100,000 volunteers on June 15, 1863. After it was mustered into service, the regiment was ordered to Harper's Ferry, West Virginia, to conduct guard duty on the lines of communication on the Upper Potomac until October, 1863.

On October 18, 1863, the 10th Maryland, alongside the 34th Massachusetts, Milner's Indiana Light Artillery Battery, and 1st Maryland Cavalry Battalion, Potomac Home Brigade, attacked Charleston, West Virginia, in which Imboden's Brigade, which had previously captured the 9th Maryland Volunteer Infantry, was driven out of the town and pursued until nightfall. However, Union forces failed to rescue the captured men, and Imboden was able to reach Front Royal by October 19, in the morning. During this attack and pursuit, the regiment took no casualties.After the engagement, the regiment was ordered back to Harper's Ferry.

The regiment was mustered out of service on January 29, 1864.

During its service, the regiment was attached to much larger formations, such as:

- Attached to 2nd Brigade, Maryland Heights Division of West Virginia, July, 1863
- 1st Brigade, Maryland Heights Division of West Virginia, to December, 1863
- 1st Brigade, 1st Division, West Virginia, to January, 1864

== Detailed service ==
=== 1863-1864 ===
- Organized at Baltimore, Md., June and July, 1863, for six months
- Ordered to Harper's Ferry, W. Va., July 16, and guard lines of the Upper Potomac till January, 1864
- Mustered out January 29, 1864.

== Commanders ==
- Colonel William H. Revere, Jr
- Lieutenant Colonel William E. Ross
- Major J. Townsend Deniel

== Casualties ==
The regiment lost 22 men to disease

== See also ==
- List of Union units from Maryland in the American Civil War
- Maryland in the American Civil War
