= James C. Toy =

American politician (died 1914)

Member of the Virginia House of Delegates from the Northampton district
- In office October 5, 1869 – December 5, 1871
- Succeeded by: Peter J. Carter

Personal details
- Born: c. 1830s Hickory, Maryland, U.S.
- Died: June 19, 1914 Washington, D.C., U.S.
- Party: Republican
- Spouse: Mary Toy (m. 1874)
- Profession: Farmer; politician; printer

Military service
- Allegiance: United States (Union)
- Branch/service: United States Army
- Years of service: 1861–1866
- Rank: Captain
- Unit: Purnell Legion Cavalry; 2nd U.S. Colored Cavalry
- Battles/wars: American Civil War; Siege of Petersburg

James C. Toy (c. 1830s – June 19, 1914), a Harford County, Maryland, native, led the 2nd United States Colored Cavalry Regiment in the American Civil War, then farmed on Virginia's Eastern Shore, where he became active in the Republican Party, serving in the Virginia Constitutional Convention of 1868 and the Virginia House of Delegates representing Northampton County, Virginia, before a war-related disability caused him to move to Petersburg and then to Washington, D.C., where he worked for the Government Printing Office until shortly before his death.

== Early and family life ==
Born some time between 1836 and 1841 in rural Hickory, Harford County, Maryland, to Eleanor Toy (1853–) and her husband, carpenter and farmer John Toy (1803 – c. 1872), James was the third of six sons; the family also included five daughters but no slaves.

He married Mary Toy in 1874. Their son William was born in 1876 and daughter Rose in 1883.

== Civil War ==
Toy and two of his brothers volunteered to serve for three year terms in the Union Army. Toy enlisted on September 27, 1861. All were initially sent to Maryland's Eastern Shore, a hotbed of Confederate sympathizers, perhaps because of its agricultural dependence on slavery. James Toy joined the Purnell Legion, Maryland Cavalry in December 1861 and would ultimately muster out of that unit as a sergeant. His elder brother George Toy received a commission as lieutenant of the 1st Regiment Eastern Shore Maryland Volunteer Infantry, and would later serve with the 11th Regiment Maryland Volunteer Infantry. His younger brother Edward Toy would serve the entire war in the 2nd Maryland Infantry, Eastern Shore, enlisting as a private and rising to sergeant.

On January 3, 1864, Toy volunteered to lead colored troops then being organized at Fort Monroe in Virginia, and received a commission as 1st lieutenant of the 2nd United States Colored Cavalry Regiment, first helping to lead company H and later rising to the rank of captain and leading Company D. The unit participated in the Siege of Petersburg and related actions until February 1865, and then was sent to Norfolk and assigned duties on Virginia's Eastern Shore before being dispatched to Texas in June 1865, and being discharged on June 15, 1865, in Brazos, Texas. Toy would be mustered out in Maryland in February 1866.

Toy returned to Virginia's Eastern Shore to farm. In Virginia's first postwar election, Captain Toy and Edward K. Snead were elected as Republicans to represent Northampton and neighboring Accomac County at the Virginia Constitutional Convention of 1868. After that Constitution was adopted, Northampton voters elected Toy to the Virginia House of Delegates in 1869 and re-elected him to the part-time position the following year. In 1871, in a close election, former slave and Union veteran Peter J. Carter won the seat, and would remain a major force in the Republican party on the Eastern shore for more than the next decade.

Toy continued to farm in Northampton County in 1880, but moved to Petersburg and in April 1881 applied for a veterans pension because of a disability. By 1894, Toy and his wife had moved to Washington, D.C., where Toy had a job as a messenger, and by 1897 worked at the Government Printing Office as a result of a nomination from Virginia's first Congressional District (which includes Northampton County which Toy once represented in the state legislature).

== Personal life ==
Toy left his printing job in 1914. He died at his family's home on B Street in Washington, D.C., on June 19, 1914. He was buried in Arlington National Cemetery.
