= 12th Maryland Volunteer Infantry Regiment =

- Active: June to July, 1864 - November 14, 1864
- Country: United States
- Allegiance: Union
- Branch: Union Army
- Type: Infantry
- Role: Guard duty
- Part of: XIII Corps
- Engagements: None

Commanders
- Lieutenant Colonel: John L. Bishop

The 12th Maryland Volunteer Infantry Regiment, was an infantry regiment that served in the Union army during the American Civil War. It was among scores of regiments that were raised in the summer of 1864 as Hundred Days Men, an effort to augment existing manpower for an all-out push to end the war within 100 days.

== Service ==
The regiment was organized from June to July, 1864, but only consisted of a battalion of five companies: A, B, C, D and E. After it was mustered into service, it was attached to the 1st Separate Brigade of VIII Corps.

The 12th Maryland spent its service conducting guard duty on the Baltimore and Ohio Railroad, between Baltimore, Maryland and Kearneysville, West Virginia until November 1864.

The regiment was mustered out of service on November 14, 1864, those who chose to re-enlist were transferred to the 1st Maryland Eastern Shore Infantry Regiment.

== Casualties ==
During their term of service, the regiment lost two men to disease.

== Commanders ==
- Lieutenant Colonel John L. Bishop

== See also ==
- List of Union units from Maryland in the American Civil War
- Maryland in the American Civil War
