= Patapsco =

Patapsco may refer to:

- Patapsco, Carroll County, Maryland, U.S.
- Patapsco Guard, an infantry company that served with the Union army during the American Civil War
- Patapsco River, Maryland, U.S.
- Patapsco station, in Halethorpe, Maryland, U.S.
- Patapsco Vallis, a valley on Mars
- USS Patapsco, a list of ships with the name
- Patapsco-class gasoline tanker, a class of U.S. Navy tankers
