= 1st Maryland Infantry Regiment =

1st Maryland Infantry Regiment may refer to:

- 1st Maryland Regiment, a unit during the American Revolution
- 1st Maryland Infantry Regiment (Confederate), a Confederate States Army regiment
- 1st Maryland Infantry Regiment (Union), a Union army regiment
- 1st Maryland Infantry Regiment, Potomac Home Brigade, a Union army regiment
- 1st Regiment Eastern Shore Maryland Volunteer Infantry, a Union army regiment

== See also ==
- 1st Maryland Cavalry Battalion (disambiguation)
