= 4th Maryland Infantry Regiment =

Infantry regiment of the Union Army from 1862 to 1865

4th Regiment Maryland Volunteer Infantry
- Active: July 1862 to May 31, 1865
- Country: United States
- Allegiance: Union
- Branch: Infantry
- Engagements: Bristoe Campaign; Mine Run Campaign; Battle of the Wilderness; Battle of Spotsylvania Court House; Battle of North Anna; Battle of Totopotomoy Creek; Battle of Cold Harbor; Siege of Petersburg; Battle of Globe Tavern; Battle of Boydton Plank Road; Battle of Hatcher's Run; Appomattox Campaign; Battle of Five Forks; Battle of Appomattox Court House

The 4th Maryland Volunteer Infantry Regiment was an infantry regiment that served in the Union Army during the American Civil War.

== Service ==
The 4th Maryland Infantry was organized at Baltimore, Maryland, July and August 1862 for three-years service under the command of Colonel William J. L. Nicodemus.

The regiment was attached to Kenly's Maryland Brigade, Defenses of the Upper Potomac, VIII Corps, Middle Department, to March 1863. 1st Brigade, 1st Division, VIII Corps, to June 1863. Maryland Brigade, French's Division, VIII Corps, to July 1863. 3rd Brigade, 3rd Division, I Corps, Army of the Potomac, to December 1863. 2nd Brigade, 3rd Division, I Corps, to March 1864. 3rd Brigade, 2nd Division, V Corps, to June 1864. 2nd Brigade, 2nd Division, V Corps, to May 1865.

The 4th Maryland Infantry mustered out of the service on May 31, 1865.

== Detailed service ==
This regiment was organized at Baltimore during July and August, 1862, except for Co. E, which was raised in Carroll County. It consisted of nine companies and was assigned to the famous Maryland Brigade, which was commanded by Gen. John R. Kenly, the first colonel of the 1st Md. infantry, and remained with the brigade throughout the war. On Sept. 18, 1862, it received marching orders and hurried to join the Army of the Potomac, then at Antietam, and arrived there in time to assist in expelling Lee's army from Maryland.

It spent the winter of 1862–63 on Maryland Heights, opposite Harper's Ferry, where it remained until April 1863, when it was sent to West Virginia to repel the raids of Gen. Imboden and Jones. The conduct of the Maryland brigade in this campaign elicited a complimentary letter from Gen. B. F. Kelley, commanding the 1st Division, 8th Corps, to Gen. Kenly. On June 30, 1863, the regiment, with the Maryland Brigade, marched to Frederick City, where it was attached to Gen. French's division, which was engaged in keeping open the communications between Washington and the Army of the Potomac. After the Battle of Gettysburg, the regiment, with the 1st and 8th Md. Infantry, made a forced march to Harper's Ferry and recaptured that place on July 6, after a sharp fight. During the summer and fall of 1863, it was with Gen. Meade's army in Eastern Virginia, taking part in a number of engagements.

In March 1864, the Maryland Brigade became the 3rd Brigade, 2nd Division, 5th Corps, and with that command was in the campaign from the Rapidan to the James, participating in the battles of the Wilderness, Spotsylvania Court House, the North Anna River, Totopotomy, Bethesda Church, the Siege of Petersburg, Hatcher's Run, Weldon Railroad, and various lesser engagements. While in service, it marched 1,089 miles and traveled by rail 649 miles. It was mustered out at Arlington Heights, Va., May 31, 1865.

== Commanders ==
- Colonel William J. L. Nicodemus - discharged November 17, 1862
- Colonel Richard Neville Bowerman

== Casualties ==
The regiment lost a total of 108 men during service; 3 officers and 32 enlisted men killed or mortally wounded, and 1 officer and 72 enlisted men due to disease.

== See also ==
- List of Maryland Civil War Units
- Maryland in the American Civil War
