= 2nd Maryland Infantry Regiment =

2nd Maryland Infantry Regiment may refer to:

- 2nd Maryland Regiment, a unit during the American Revolution
- 2nd Maryland Infantry Regiment (Confederate), a regiment in the Confederate States Army
- 2nd Maryland Infantry Regiment (Union), a regiment in the Union army
- 2nd Maryland Infantry Regiment, Potomac Home Brigade, a regiment in the Union army
- 2nd Maryland Infantry, Eastern Shore, a regiment in the Union army

== See also ==
- 2nd Maryland Cavalry Battalion, a Confederate unit
