= 6th Maryland Volunteer Infantry Regiment =

6th Regiment Maryland Volunteer Infantry
- State Flag of Maryland
- Active: between August 12 and September 3, 1862 - April 9, 1865
- Country: United States
- Allegiance: Union
- Branch: Union Army
- Type: Infantry
- Size: Regiment (1,734)
- Part of: III Corps (Union army) (1863); VI Corps (Union army) (1864)
- Equipment: Pattern 1853 Enfield Muskets
- Engagements: Second Battle of Winchester; Battle of Wapping Heights; Bristoe Campaign; Battle of Mine Run; Battle of the Wilderness; Battle of Spotsylvania Court House; Battle of Cold Harbor; Siege of Petersburg; Battle of Jerusalem Plank Road; First Battle of Ream's Station; Battle of Monocacy; Battle of Opequon; Battle of Fisher's Hill; Battle of Cedar Creek; Appomattox Campaign

The 6th Maryland Volunteer Infantry Regiment was a volunteer infantry regiment that served in the Union Army during the American Civil War. Recognized as one of the "three hundred fighting regiments" of the war, they participated in engagements from the Shenandoah Valley to the Siege of Petersburg.

== Organization ==
The regiment was organized at Baltimore, Maryland, between August 12 and September 3, 1862, to serve a three-year enlistment. It was composed of ten companies recruited from various regions of the state, including Caroll, Cecil, Frederick, Washington and Queen Anne's counties, as well as the city of Baltimore, with the regiment numbering 1,734 in total.

== Service ==
The regiment was initially assigned to the Defenses of the Upper Potomac. It spent its first months performing duty between Williamsport and Hagerstown, Maryland, before moving to Maryland Heights in December 1862.

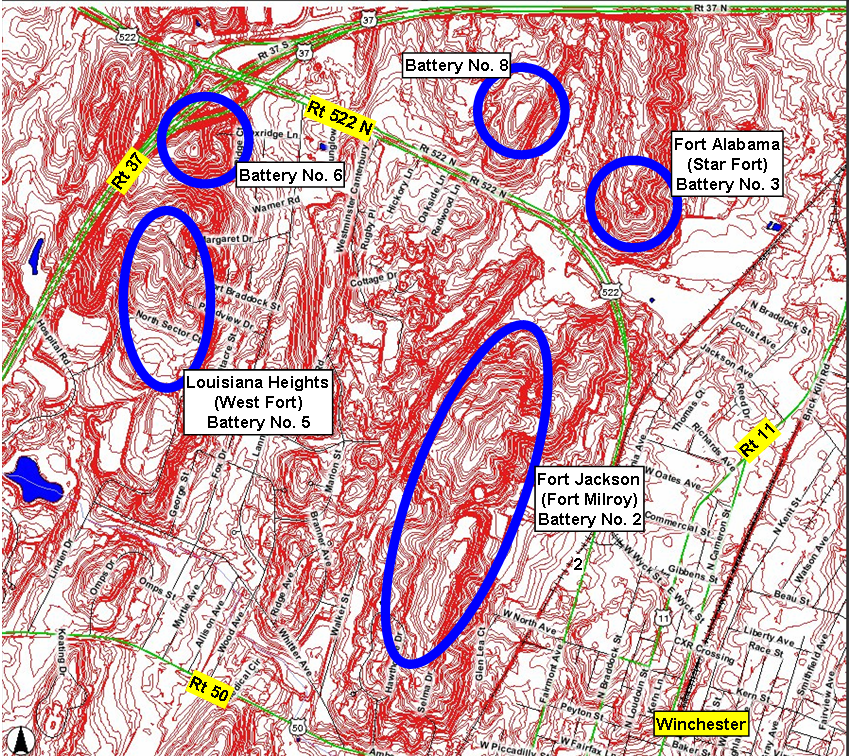
A map of the forts in Winchester, the regiment was at Star Fort (Fort Alabama as seen in the picture)where they distinguished themselves.

In March 1863, the regiment was moved to Berryville, Virginia. During the Second Battle of Winchester (June 14-15, 1863) the 6th Maryland Distinguished itself by defending Star Fort. While much of Milroy's Division was captured during the retreat, the 6th Maryland managed to perform a skillful flank maneuver, escaping almost intact to Harper's Ferry. The regiment would go into battle with 580 officers and men, and would lose 174 as casualties.

Following the retreat, the regiment was attached to the III Army Corps of the Army of the Potomac. They participated in the pursuit of Robert E. Lee's army after Gettysburg, seeing action at Wapping Heights and later participating in the Bristoe and Mine Run campaigns.

In March 1864, the regiment was transferred to the VI Corps, which would remain there for the rest of the war, they took part in Grant's Overland Campaign, Suffering heavy casualties at The Wilderness, Spotsylvania Court House and at Cold Harbor.

The regiment first arrived at the Siege of Petersburg on June 18, 1864, participating the Battles of Jerusalem Plank Road and the First Battle of Ream's Station.

In July 1864, the regiment was rushed to counter Jubal Early's Invasion, fighting at the Battle of Monocacy. This move helped secure Washington D.C., from Confederate Capture. They would later serve in Sheridan's Shenandoah Valley campaign, taking part in the Battle of Opequan, Fisher's Hill and Cedar Creek.

The regiment returned to the Petersburg trenches in early December 1864. During the final months of the war, they were involved in the battles of Fort Fisher and the Breakthrough at Petersburg, During the final assault, Major Clifton K. Prentiss was mortally wounded.

Following the fall of the city, the 6th Maryland pursued the Confederate army to Appomattox Court House, witnessing Lee's Surrender on April 9, 1865. The regiment was finally mustered out of service on June 20, 1865.

== Commanders ==
- Colonel John W. Horn - Mustered out with the regiment
- Captain John J. Bradshaw.
- Lieutenant Colonel Joseph C. Hill
- Major Clifton K. Prentiss - Mortally wounded in the Third Battle of Petersburg
- Colonel John R. Rouzer - Honorably discharged on June 20, 1865

== Medal of Honor recipients ==
- John E. Buffington - Medal of Honor Recipient (Company C)

== Casualties ==
- Killed/Mortally Wounded: 8 officers, 120 enlisted men
- Died of Disease: 1 officer, 107 enlisted men
- Wounded in Battle: 233 enlisted men
- Total: 469 Enlisted Men, 9 Officers

== Flags ==
The regiment was given their regimental flag while stationed in "Champ" hill in Harpers ferry in 1863. The banner was dubbed the "Elkton Flag." The whole thing was made of silk with one side having the coat of arms of the United States while the other bore the coat of arms of the state. It was held on to by Lieutenant Colonel William A. McKellip after the war, he later gave the flag to the G.A.R chapter in Elkton.

In 1865 the state ordered a new set of colors for the regiment. They were later given to the Adjutant General office in Annapolis after the war ended.

Company D carried their own flag dubbed the "Mechanicstown Flag." It was made by a group of women from the town, its design is not known and after the war it was lost. In the early 1880s some of the former members of the company reached out to their old Lieutenant Colonel but were unable to find it.

== See also ==
- List of Union units from Maryland in the American Civil War
- Maryland in the American Civil War
