= 13th Maryland Infantry Regiment =

Military unit on the Union side during the American Civil War

- Active: May 29, 1865 - March 1, 1865
- Country: United States
- Allegiance: Union
- Branch: Union Army
- Type: Infantry
- Role: Duty at Martinsburg, West Virginia
- Engagements: None

The 13th Maryland Infantry was a regiment of infantry from the State of Maryland that fought on the Union side during the American Civil War.

== Service ==
The regiment was organized from veterans and new recruits of the 1st Maryland Infantry Regiment, Potomac Home Brigade, in March 1, 1865, and was designated as the 13th Maryland on April 8, 1865.

The regiment would spend its service conducting duty at Martinsburg, Virginia, alongside the Baltimore and Ohio Railroad until May 29, 1865.

The regiment would be mustered out of service on May 29, 1865.

== Casualties ==
During the regiment's short time in existence, seven soldiers died, and forty-five soldiers deserted.

== Commanders ==
- Colonel E. Cook
- Lieutenant Colonel Charles J. Brown
- Major Eugene C. Baugher

== See also ==
- List of Union units from Maryland in the American Civil War
- Maryland in the American Civil War
