= 5th Maryland Infantry Regiment =

Union Army infantry regiment from the American Civil War

5th Regiment Maryland Volunteer Infantry
- Active: September 1861 to September 1, 1865
- Country: United States
- Allegiance: Union
- Branch: Infantry
- Engagements: Battle of Antietam; Second Battle of Winchester; Siege of Petersburg; Battle of Chaffin's Farm; Battle of Fair Oaks & Darbytown Road; Battle of Hatcher's Run; Appomattox Campaign; Battle of Appomattox Court House

The 5th Maryland Volunteer Infantry Regiment was an infantry regiment that served in the Union Army during the American Civil War.

== Service ==
The 5th Maryland Infantry was organized at Baltimore, Maryland in September 1861 for three-years service and mustered in under the command of Colonel William Louis Schley.

The regiment was attached to Dix's Division, Baltimore, Maryland, to March 1862. Fort Monroe, Virginia, to July 1862. Weber's Brigade, Division at Suffolk, Virginia, VII Corps, Department of Virginia, to September 1862. 3rd Brigade, 3rd Division, II Corps, Army of the Potomac, to December 1862. Point of Rocks Defenses, Upper Potomac, VIII Corps, Middle Department, to March 1863. 2nd Brigade, 1st Division, VIII Corps, to July 1863. Defenses of Baltimore, Maryland, VIII Corps, to January 1864. District of Delaware, VIII Corps, to June 1864. 3rd Brigade, 2nd Division, XVIII Corps, Army of the James, to August 1864. 2nd Brigade, 1st Division, XVIII Corps, to December 1864. 2nd Brigade, 3rd Division, XXIV Corps, to July 1865. 2nd Independent Brigade, XXIV Corps, to September 1865.

The 5th Maryland Infantry mustered out of the service on September 1, 1865 at Fredericksburg, Virginia.

== Detailed service ==
Camp at LaFayette Square, Baltimore, Md., until March 1862. Ordered to Fort Monroe, Va., March 11, 1862. Duty there and at Suffolk, Va., to September 1862. Moved to Washington, D.C., then to Antietam, Md., September 8–16. Battle of Antietam, September 16–17. Moved to Harpers Ferry September 22 and duty there until January 1863. Reconnaissance to Charleston October 16–17. At Point of Rocks and Maryland Heights protecting the Baltimore & Ohio Railroad until June 1863. Moved to Winchester, Va., June 2. Battle of Winchester June 13–15, where the regiment was mostly captured. Members of the regiment not captured were at Bloody Run, Pa., and Loudon, Pa., until July. Duty in the defenses of Baltimore, Middle Department, until January 1864, and in the District of Delaware, Middle Department, until June 1864. Ordered to join the Army of the Potomac in the field June 4, 1864. Siege operations against Petersburg and Richmond, Va., June 16, 1864 to April 2, 1865. Mine Explosion, Petersburg, July 30, 1864 (reserve). Duty in trenches before Petersburg until September 27. Battle of Chaffin's Farm, New Market Heights, September 28–30. Battle of Fair Oaks October 27–28. Duty in trenches before Richmond until April 1865. Occupation of Richmond April 3. Pursuit of Lee to Appomattox Court House April 3–9. Appomattox Court House April 9. Surrender of Lee and his army. Duty in the Department of Virginia until September.

== Commanders ==
- Colonel William Louis Schley
- Colonel William W. Barnberger - commanded the regiment at the Battle of Antietam while still at the rank of captain until he was also wounded in action. At which point still in command of the 5th, directed the movement of the picket line leading to Richmond, and along with the 12th New Hampshire volunteers as well as the 9th Vermont, were the first to enter Richmond on the 2 April 1865.
- Major Leopold Blumenberg - commanded at the Battle of Antietam until wounded in action
- Captain Ernest F. M. Faehtz - commanded at the Battle of Antietam after Cpt. Marsh was wounded and captured
- Captain Salome Marsh - commanded at the Battle of Antietam after Cpt. Barnberger was wounded, until he was wounded and captured

== Casualties ==
The regiment lost a total of 161 men during service; 1 officer and 63 enlisted men killed or mortally wounded, and 6 officers and 91 enlisted men due to disease.

== See also ==
- List of Maryland Civil War Units
- Maryland in the American Civil War
