= James Monroe Deems =

American musician (1818–1901)

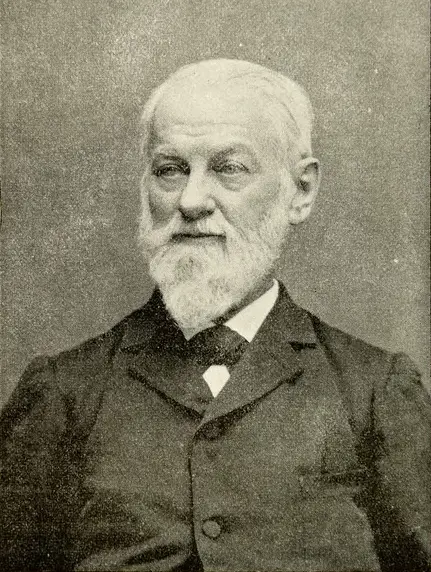
- Portrait of Deems in 1900
- Born: January 5, 1818; Baltimore, Maryland, U.S.
- Died: April 18, 1901 (aged 83); Baltimore, Maryland, U.S.
- Resting place: Green Mount Cemetery
- Occupations: Composer; educator; military officer
- Known for: composition of Nebuchadnezzar and Vocal Music Simplified
- Military career
- Branch: Union Army
- Service years: 1861–1863
- Rank: Lieutenant colonel Brevet brigadier general
- Unit: 1st Maryland Cavalry Regiment
- Conflicts: Battle of Charlestown; Second Battle of Bull Run; Second Battle of Fredericksburg; Battle of Brandy Station; Battle of Aldie; Battle of Gettysburg; Battle of Shepherdstown; Battle of Orange Courthouse; Battle of Madison Courthouse; Battle of Cedar Mountain

James Monroe Deems (January 5, 1818 – April 18, 1901) was an American composer, music educator, and Union Army officer. During the American Civil War, he served as lieutenant colonel and was later brevetted as a brigadier general. After studying music in Dresden, he taught music at the University of Virginia and was one of the first conductors at the Peabody Institute in Baltimore. He was known for writing the 1850 book Vocal Music Simplified and composing the oratorio Nebuchadnezzar.

== Early life ==
James Monroe Deems was born on January 5, 1818, in Baltimore, Maryland, to Jacob Deems. His father was the collector of the Port of Baltimore and served as the captain who commanded the 53rd Maryland Regiment during the War of 1812. His grandfather Frederick Deems was a member of the 3rd Pennsylvania Regiment in the American Revolution. At the age of five, Deems started to play the bugle. He performed in the band of his father's company as a child. He was first instructed by William Rountree of his father's company. At 13, he became a member of the Baltimore orchestra. Besides the bugle, he played the clarinet, French horn, piano, and organ. He studied privately with George Loder of Baltimore. In 1839, he went to Dresden, Germany to study music with Friedrich Dotzauer. While in Germany, he almost partook in a duel with a German Army officer, but it didn't take place. He was known to also play the cornopean.

== Career ==
In 1841 or 1849, Deems returned to Baltimore and opened a studio. In the 1830s and 1840s, he was affiliated with German-American Henry Dielman. He delivered dispatches to the Austrian government in 1851. Starting in 1848, he became a professor of music at the University of Virginia, but resigned in 1858 to travel Europe with his family for a year.

In 1861, Deems returned to the United States and helped raise the 1st Maryland Cavalry Regiment and joined the regiment as a major. He served under General Rufus Saxton at Harper's Ferry. In May 1862, he was given his own regiment of six companies for a reconnoitering party to discover the position of Stonewall Jackson and met the cavalry of Thomas T. Munford at the Battle of Charlestown, before returning back to Harper's Ferry. He served under General Franz Sigel as an assistant inspector of cavalry in his southern advance. He later served under General Edward Hatch. By the Second Battle of Bull Run, he was chief of cavalry and served on the staff of the XI Corps. Following the Second Battle of Fredericksburg, his regiment joined the cavalry corps of General George Stoneman and participated in his raid. By 1863, he attained the rank of lieutenant colonel and served under General David McMurtrie Gregg's command at the battles of Brandy Station, Aldie, Gettysburg, and Shepherdstown. He also served at the battles of Orange Courthouse, Madison Courthouse, and Cedar Mountain. In September 1863, he was hospitalized for rheumatism and was discharged from a hospital in Annapolis in November 1863 for disability. On July 26, 1866, President Andrew Johnson nominated Deems for appointment to the grade of brevet brigadier general of volunteers, to rank from March 13, 1865, and the United States Senate confirmed the appointment on July 27, 1866.

Following the war, Deems taught music again and ran a music school at Fremont Avenue and Hollins Street in Baltimore. He was the first director of the Peabody Institute and organized the first musical activities of the Academy of Music in 1866. He was one of the conductors for the first season of the Peabody Institute from 1866 to 1867 and was the sole conductor from 1867 to 1868. He wrote music textbooks. He wrote the 1850 book Vocal Music Simplified, which was one of the earliest public-school music texts in the U.S. He also wrote Nebuchadnezzar, a biblical cantata and oratorio. He wrote a book on piano, cornet, and organ methods. He wrote the opera Esther and an unfinished opera titled The Unbidden Guest. He wrote a number of songs, including "May I Hope to Call Thee Friend", his first published song. He composed The Pioneer's Quick Step for Samuel Carusi. He also composed a funeral march for Samuel Ringgold. In 1879, he composed New and Easy Method for Parlor Organ. He also composed Reflection.

== Personal life ==
Deems married. They had three sons, J. Harry, Charles W., and Clarence. He was a member of the Franklin Square Baptist Church and was the cornetist for the church and its Sunday School. He was a member of the Loyal Legion, Grand Army of the Republic, Odd Fellows, and Masons.

Deems died on April 18, 1901, at his Hollins Street home in Baltimore. He was buried in Green Mount Cemetery.

== See also ==
- List of American Civil War brevet generals (Union)
