= 1st Maryland Cavalry Battalion =

1st Maryland Cavalry Battalion may refer to:

- 1st Maryland Cavalry Battalion (Confederate), a Confederate unit
- 1st Maryland Cavalry Battalion, Potomac Home Brigade, a pro-Union unit

== See also ==
- 1st Maryland Cavalry Regiment, a volunteer regiment in the Union army
- 1st Maryland Infantry Regiment (disambiguation)
