= 9th Maryland Infantry Regiment =

Military unit on the Union side during the American Civil War

9th Regiment Maryland Volunteer Infantry
- Active: June 1863 to February 24, 1864
- Country: United States
- Allegiance: Union
- Branch: Infantry
- Engagements: Battle of Charlestown

The 9th Maryland Volunteer Infantry Regiment was an infantry regiment that served in the Union Army during the American Civil War.

== Service ==
The 9th Maryland Infantry was organized at Baltimore, Maryland, June–July 1863 for six months service under the command of Colonel Benjamin L. Simpson.

The regiment was attached to 1st Brigade, Maryland Heights, Division of West Virginia, to December 1863. 1st Brigade, 1st Division, West Virginia, to February 1864.

The 9th Maryland Infantry mustered out of the service at Baltimore on February 24, 1864.

== Detailed service ==
Moved from Baltimore to western Maryland July 6, 1863. Occupation of Maryland Heights July 7, 1863. At Loudon Heights until August. Guard duty on the Baltimore & Ohio Railroad. Company B at Duffield Station, Company C at Brown's Crossing, Companies A and B served provost duty at Harpers Ferry, Companies D, E, F, G, H, and I at Charles Town, West Virginia, until October 18. Attacked by Brigadier General John D. Imboden and captured. Companies A, B, and C on duty in West Virginia until February 1864. Moved to Baltimore for muster out.

== Commanders ==
- Colonel Benjamin L. Simpson

== Casualties ==
The regiment lost a total of 126 men during service, 2 enlisted men killed or mortally wounded and 124 enlisted men due to disease.

== See also ==
- List of Maryland Civil War Units
- Maryland in the American Civil War
