= Peter J. Carter =

American politician (1845–1886)

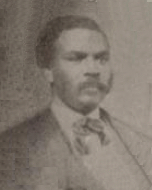
- Official portrait, 1872

Member of the Virginia House of Delegates from Northampton County
- In office December 6, 1871 – December 3, 1879
- Preceded by: James C. Toy
- Succeeded by: Thomas A. Downs

Personal details
- Born: Peter Jacob Carter; May 29, 1845 Eastville, Virginia, U.S.
- Died: July 19, 1886 (aged 41) Virginia, U.S.
- Party: Republican (until 1881; 1884–1886); Readjuster (1881‍–‍1884)
- Spouses: Georgianna Mapp (died 1882); Maggie Treherne (m. 1884)
- Education: Hampton Institute

Military service
- Allegiance: United States (Union)
- Branch/service: United States Army
- Years of service: 1863–1866
- Unit: 10th U.S. Colored Infantry
- Battles/wars: American Civil War

Peter Jacob Carter (May 29, 1845 – July 19, 1886) was an American Republican politician who served as a member of the Virginia House of Delegates, representing Northampton County from 1871 to 1879. He was one of the first African-Americans to serve in Virginia's government. He fell ill while traveling via steamboat between Norfolk and the Eastern Shore of Virginia, and died soon thereafter; the cause of his death was likely appendicitis. He was interred in the family cemetery near Franktown. A historic marker in his honor was erected by the Virginia Department of Historic Resources in 2009. It stands in front of Bethel Baptist Church, which had been constructed on land that he had donated.

== See also ==
- African American officeholders from the end of the Civil War until before 1900

Virginia House of Delegates
| Preceded by James C. Toy | Virginia Delegate for Northampton County; 1871–1879 | Succeeded by Thomas A. Downs |
