= 2nd Maryland Infantry Regiment, Potomac Home Brigade =

2nd Maryland Infantry, Potomac Home Brigade
- Active: August 15, 1861 - May 29, 1865
- Country: United States
- Allegiance: Union
- Branch: Infantry
- Engagements: Battle of Folck's Mill; Battle of Summit Point (Company F)

The 2nd Maryland Infantry, Potomac Home Brigade was an infantry regiment that served in the Union Army during the American Civil War.

== Service ==
The 2nd Maryland Infantry, Potomac Home Brigade was organized at Cumberland, Maryland beginning August 27, 1861 for three-years service under the command of Colonel Thomas Johns.

The regiment was attached to Railroad District West Virginia to February 1862. District of Cumberland, Mountain Department, to April 1862. Railroad District, Department of the Mountains, to July 1862. Railroad District, VIII Corps, Middle Department, to September 1862. Railroad Division, District of West Virginia, Department of the Ohio, to January 1863. Cumberland, Maryland, Defenses Upper Potomac, VIII Corps, Middle Department, to March 1863. 5th Brigade, 1st Division, VIII Corps, to June 1863. Mulligan's Brigade, Scammon's Division, Army of West Virginia, to December 1863. 2nd Brigade, 2nd Division West Virginia, to April 1864. Reserve Division, Kelly's Command, West Virginia, to April 1865. 2nd Brigade, 1st Division West Virginia, to May 1865. (Company F, was attached to Cavalry, Martinsburg, West Virginia, VIII Corps, January to March 1863. 3rd Brigade, 1st Division, VIII Corps, to June 1863. 1st Brigade, Maryland Heights, Division of West Virginia, to December 1863. Cavalry, 1st Division of West Virginia.)

The 2nd Maryland Infantry, Potomac Home Brigade mustered out of the service August through December 1864. The regiment continued to recruit for veteran service, and its designation was changed to the 13th Maryland Infantry.

== Detailed service ==
Duty on the Baltimore & Ohio Railroad. At Patterson Creek and Romney, Va., until March 1862. Skirmishes at Springfield, Va., August 23, 1861. Blue House August 26. South Branch Bridge, Mill Creek Mills, Romney, and Springfield, October 26. Great Cacapon Bridge January 4, 1862. Duty at Charles Town, New Creek, and Cumberland guarding the railroad between and to the Ohio River until March 1863; and from Monocacy Bridge to the Ohio River until April 1864. Action at Vance's Ford, near Romney, September 17, 1862. Charles Town, W. Va., May 15, 1863. Berryville June 14, 1863 (Company F). Point of Rocks June 17 (Company F). Summit Point October 7, 1863 (Company F). Charles Town, W. Va., October 18, 1863. Burlington November 16. Salem December 16, 1863. Jackson River, near Covington, December 19, 1863. Ridgeville, Va., January 4, 1864. Moorefield Junction January 8, 1864. Medley January 30, 1864. Hunter's Raid on Lynchburg May 26-July 1, 1864. Lynchburg June 17–18. Salem June 21. Salem Branch Bridge July 4. Sir John's Run July 6. Snicker's Gap July 18. Kernstown, Winchester July 24. Martinsburg July 25. Back Creek Bridge July 27. Hancock, Md., July 31. Green Springs Run August 2. Guard duty in West Virginia until May 1865.

== Commanders ==
- Colonel Thomas Johns - resigned January 1, 1862
- Colonel Robert Bruce - mustered out October 4, 1864
- Lieutenant Colonel James C. Lynn - mustered out as commanding officer of the regiment

== Casualties ==
The regiment lost a total of 94 men during service; 1 officers and 9 enlisted men killed or mortally wounded, 84 enlisted men died of disease.

== See also ==
- List of Maryland Civil War Units
- Maryland in the American Civil War

== Sources ==
- Dyer, Frederick H. A Compendium of the War of the Rebellion (Des Moines, IA: Dyer Pub. Co.), 1908.
- Shaw, Benjamin Burbridge. Guarding the River, the Canal, and the Railroad: Papers of Captain Benjamin Burbridge Shaw, Commanding Officer, Company D, 2nd Regiment, Potomac Home Brigade, Maryland Volunteers (New Creek, WV: J. Sanders), 1998. ISBN 0-8701-2597-4

Attribution
