= List of Union units from Maryland in the American Civil War =

Calvert family banner, displayed by Maryland Unionists as an unofficial flag during the Civil War.

This is a list of Civil War regiments from Maryland which fought in the Union Army. The list of Maryland Confederate Civil War units is shown separately.

== Infantry ==
- 1st Maryland Infantry Regiment
- 1st Maryland Infantry, Potomac Home Brigade
- 1st Regiment Eastern Shore Maryland Volunteer Infantry
- 2nd Maryland Infantry Regiment
- 2nd Regiment Maryland Eastern Shore Infantry
- 2nd Maryland Infantry, Potomac Home Brigade
- 3rd Regiment Maryland Volunteer Infantry
- 3rd Maryland Infantry, Potomac Home Brigade
- 4th Regiment Maryland Volunteer Infantry
- 4th Regiment Potomac Home Brigade Infantry
- 5th Regiment Maryland Volunteer Infantry
- 6th Regiment Maryland Volunteer Infantry
- 7th Regiment Maryland Volunteer Infantry
- 8th Regiment Maryland Volunteer Infantry
- 9th Regiment Maryland Volunteer Infantry
- 10th Regiment Maryland Volunteer Infantry
- 11th Regiment Maryland Volunteer Infantry
- 12th Regiment Maryland Volunteer Infantry
- 13th Regiment Maryland Volunteer Infantry
- 19th United States Colored Infantry Regiment (Raised in the eastern shores of Maryland)
- Purnell Legion Infantry
- Baltimore Light Guard Infantry
- Patapsco Guard

== Cavalry ==
- 1st Regiment Maryland Volunteer Cavalry
- 2nd Regiment Maryland Volunteer Cavalry
- 3rd Regiment Maryland Volunteer Cavalry - Bradford Dragoons
- 1st Maryland Cavalry Battalion, Potomac Home Brigade - Cole's Cavalry
- Purnell Legion Maryland Volunteer Cavalry
- Smith's Independent Company Maryland Volunteer Cavalry

== Artillery ==
- 1st Regiment Maryland Heavy Artillery
- Battery A, Maryland Light Artillery (Rigby's Battery)
- Battery "A" Junior Maryland Light Artillery
- Snow's Battery "B" Maryland Light Artillery
- Battery "B" Junior Maryland Light Artillery
- Battery "D" Maryland Light Artillery
- Baltimore Independent Battery Light Artillery

== See also ==
- Lists of American Civil War Regiments by State
