= John E. Buffington =

- Born: July 12, 1839; Carroll County, Maryland
- Died: April 26, 1915 (aged 75); Washington
- Military career
- Allegiance: United States of America
- Branch: United States Army
- Service years: August 21, 1862 to June 20, 1865
- Rank: Sergeant
- Unit: 6th Regiment Maryland Volunteer Infantry - Company C
- Conflicts: Third Battle of Petersburg
- Awards: Medal of Honor

Sergeant John E. Buffington (July 12, 1839 – April 26, 1915) was an American soldier who fought in the American Civil War. Buffington received the country's highest award for bravery during combat, the Medal of Honor, for his action during the Third Battle of Petersburg in Virginia on 2 April 1865. He was honored with the award on 3 April 1908.

== Biography ==
Born in Carroll County, Maryland, Buffington enlisted in the 6th Maryland Infantry Regiment. He is noted as the first Union soldier to raise a flag within the Confederates lines for the Third Division of the VI Corps of the Union Army at the Third Battle of Petersburg. This act, which he performed on 2 April 1865, earned him the medal of honor. However, Buffington was not presented with the medal until 1908 as he had mustered out of the army without applying for it.

== Medal of Honor citation ==
Was the first enlisted man of the 3d Division to mount the parapet of the enemy's line.

== See also ==
- List of American Civil War Medal of Honor recipients: A–F
