= Leopold Blumenberg =

Prussian military officer (1827–1876)

- Born: 1827 near Frankfurt an der Oder, Kingdom of Prussia
- Died: August 12, 1876 (aged 48–49); Baltimore, Maryland, US
- Burial place: Har Sinai Cemetery, Baltimore
- Military career
- Allegiance: Kingdom of Prussia; United States of America
- Branch: Prussian Army; United States Army
- Rank: Oberleutnant; Major (US); Brevet Colonel (US)
- Unit: 5th Maryland Infantry Regiment
- Conflicts: First Schleswig War; American Civil War: Battle of Antietam
- Other work: Customs service

Leopold Blumenberg (1827–1876) was a Prussian Army officer who later served as a Union Army officer during the American Civil War.

== Biography ==
Leopold Blumenberg was born in Frankfurt an der Oder, Prussia, and served in the Prussian Army during the First Schleswig War (1848–1852). He married Emilie Pauline Agnes Knorre in Berlin in 1853, where he was described as “the foreman of an umbrella factory” and “of the Jewish persuasion.” After resigning as a first lieutenant, Blumenberg immigrated to Baltimore, Maryland, in 1854. There, he became a successful manufacturer and ardent abolitionist, reportedly influenced by Rabbi David Einhorn to join the Republican Party.

After the American Civil War broke out Blumenberg joined the 5th Maryland Infantry Regiment, being commissioned as Captain of Company C on September 26, 1861. He quickly advanced to Major. He raised volunteers in Baltimore despite hostility from pro-slavery residents, requiring his house to be guarded. During the Battle of Antietam, he was shot in the thigh by a Confederate sharpshooter, leaving him with a permanent injury.

In May 1863, President Lincoln appointed Blumenberg as provost marshal for Maryland's 3rd District in Baltimore, due to his distinguished service, injury, and Republican affiliation. However, on January 17, 1865, the War Department dismissed him amid accusations of excessive enforcement of conscription laws and torture. Lincoln defended Blumenberg, requesting an inquiry and subsequently appointing him superintendent of warehouses at the Baltimore customhouse after Stanton refused to reinstate him.

President Andrew Johnson later brevetted Blumenberg to Lieutenant Colonel and Colonel for his “gallant and meritorious services” during the Civil War, including the Battle of Antietam. He was also nominated for the brevet grade of Brigadier General but, after changes in laws, the nomination was not confirmed by the Senate. Blumenberg died of Bright's disease on August 12, 1876, and was buried in Har Sinai Cemetery in Baltimore.

== See also ==
- Military history of Jewish Americans
