= 1st Maryland Infantry Regiment, Potomac Home Brigade =

- Active: August 15, 1861, to December 1864
- Country: United States
- Allegiance: Union
- Branch: United States Army; Union Army
- Type: Infantry
- Engagements: Battle of Harper's Ferry; Battle of Gettysburg; Battle of New Market (detachment); Battle of Monocacy (5 companies)

Commanders
- Colonel: William P. Maulsby

The 1st Maryland Infantry Regiment, Potomac Home Brigade was an infantry regiment that served in the Union Army during the American Civil War.

== Service ==
The 1st Maryland Infantry, Potomac Home Brigade was organized at Frederick, Maryland, beginning August 15, 1861, and mustered in on December 13, 1861, for three years under the command of Colonel William P. Maulsby.

Companies A, B, D and I were recruited in Frederick County. Company C was recruited from Baltimore City. Companies E, F and H were recruited from Washington County. Company G comprised men from Baltimore, Carroll and Frederick Counties. Company K was from recruited Baltimore city and Frederick County.

The regiment was attached to:

- Banks' Division, Army of the Potomac, to March 1862.
- Unassigned, Banks' V Corps, and Department of the Shenandoah to May 1862.
- Railroad District, Middle Department, to July 1862.
- Railroad District, VIII Corps, Middle Department, to September 1862.
- Annapolis, Maryland, VIII Corps, to March 1863.
- 1st Separate Brigade, VIII Corps, to June 1863.
- Lockwood's Brigade, VIII Corps, to July 1863.
- 2nd Brigade, 1st Division, XII Corps, Army of the Potomac, July 1863.
- 2nd Brigade, Maryland Heights, Division West Virginia, to December 1863.
- 2nd Brigade, 1st Division, West Virginia, to April 1864.
- Reserve Division, Harpers Ferry, West Virginia, to January 1865.
- 3rd Brigade, 3rd Division, West Virginia, to April 1865.

The 1st Maryland Infantry, Potomac Home Brigade mustered out of the service August through December 1864. Afterwards reenlisting veterans and new recruits formed the 13th Maryland Infantry Regiment.

== Detailed service ==
Railroad guard duty until March 1862. Advance on Winchester, Va., March 7–12. Strasburg March 27. Guarding Baltimore & Ohio Railroad until May. Concentrated at Harpers Ferry May 24, and action at Loudon Heights May 27. Defense of Harpers Ferry May 28–30. Guard Baltimore & Ohio Railroad until September. Action at Monocacy Aqueduct September 4. Poolesville September 5. Concentrated at Sandy Hook and march to Harpers Ferry. Siege of Harper's Ferry September 12–15. Maryland Heights September 13. Harpers Ferry September 14–15. Surrendered September 15 and paroled September 16. Sent to Annapolis, Md., and when exchanged assigned to duty on the Potomac in southern Maryland to June 1863. Martinsburg June 14. At point Lookout June. Joined Lockwood's Brigade and march to Gettysburg, Pa., June 25-July 2. Battle of Gettysburg July 2–3. Pursuit of Lee July 5–24. Guard duty on Baltimore Ohio Railroad in Maryland and Virginia until May 1864. Operations against Early's invasion of Maryland June and July. Duffield Station June 29. Battle of Monocacy July 9. Moved from Monocacy to Harpers Ferry, West Virginia, and duty in that district until April 1865.

=== Gettysburg ===
==== First Day ====
Under command of Col. Maulsby, the regiment formed part of 2nd Brigade (Brig. Gen. Henry H. Lockwood), 1st Division (Brig. Gen. Alpheus S. Williams), XII Corps (Maj. Gen. Henry W. Slocum) at the Battle of Gettysburg. The regiment mustered 674 all ranks, making it the largest regiment in the Army of the Potomac. The regiment reached Gettysburg during the afternoon of July 1, but was not engaged.

==== Second Day ====
On the morning of July 2, the regiment constructed breastworks south of Culp's Hill at McAlister's Woods. The entire division was withdrawn later in the day and sent south to support a section of the Union line under attack by Longstreet's Corps. Returning to Culp's Hill that evening, the regiment discovered that its breastworks had been captured by Confederates of Maj. Gen. Edward "Allegheny" Johnson's division.

==== Third Day ====
On July 3, the regiment fought to hold ground against renewed attacks by Johnson's division. Bloody fighting continued until around 11:00 a.m. when Johnson finally broke off his attack. XII Corps commander Brig. Gen. Alpheus Williams wrote: "The wonder is that the rebels persisted so long in an attempt that the first half hour must have told them was useless."

==== Losses ====
The regiment mustered 674 all ranks at the beginning of the battle. It lost 104 killed, wounded, captured and missing.

== Commanders ==
- Colonel William P. Maulsby - mustered out August 25, 1864
- Major J. Townsend Daniel - commanded at the Battle of New Market
- Captain Charles J. Brown - commanded at the Battle of Monocacy

== Casualties ==
The regiment lost a total of 131 men during service; 3 officers and 42 enlisted men killed or mortally wounded, 1 officer and 85 enlisted men died of disease.

== See also ==
- List of Maryland Civil War Units
- Maryland in the American Civil War

== Sources ==
- Adkin, Mark. The Gettysburg Companion (Mechanicsburg, PA: Stackpole), 2008.
- Dyer, Frederick H. A Compendium of the War of the Rebellion (Des Moines, IA: Dyer Pub. Co.), 1908.
- Hildebrand, Virginia Mumma. The Sharpsburg rifles, First Maryland Regiment, Potomac Home Brigade, Maryland Volunteers (Maryland?: s.n.), ca. 1900.
- Wilmer, L. Allison, et al. History and Roster of Maryland Volunteers, War of 1861-5 (Baltimore, MD: Press of Guggenheimer, Weil, & Co.), 1898.

Attribution
