= Patapsco Guard =

- Active: September 25, 1861 - August 17, 1865
- Country: United States
- Allegiance: Union
- Branch: Union Army
- Type: Independent Infantry Company
- Size: 250
- Engagements: Gettysburg Campaign; McCausland's raid

The Patapsco Guard, also known as McGowan's Independent Maryland Infantry Company, was an independent infantry company that served with the Union army during the American Civil War. Organized at Ellicott’s Mills, it would conduct guard and provost duties at Ellicott's Mill before taking part in the Gettysburg Campaign, engaging in skirmishes. After the Gettysburg Campaign, the company would continue its service in Pennsylvania, and would oppose Confederate Brig. Gen. John McCausland's raid into Chambersburg Raid in July 1864. The company was mustered out of service on August 17, 1865.

== Service ==
The company was organized at Ellicott's Mills, Maryland on September 25, 1861, for three years' service, and upon formation, it was attached to Dix's Division, Army of the Potomac. Its initial service was spent on conducting guard duty on the Philadelphia, Wilmington & Baltimore Railroad, before it went on guard and provost duties on several locations such as Ellicott's Mills, York, Harrisburg and Chambersburg, Pennsylvania.

While operating out of Ellicott's Mills, the company's duties also included managing Confederate prisoners of war at the Baltimore & Ohio Railroad. Following the engagements at Antietam and the Gettysburg, captured Confederate soldiers were held there, waiting for either their parole or transfer to other Union prison camps.

=== Gettysburg Campaign ===
The company would take part in the Gettysburg Campaign in late June 1863, in which it would play a role in defending the crossings at the Susquehanna River. As Confederate forces under Maj. Gen. Jubal Early occupied York, Brig Gen. John B. Gordon's Brigade was dispatched to seize the bridge connecting Wrightsville and Columbia, Which, if captured, would allow Confederate forces to cross the river and threaten Harrisburg from the rear.

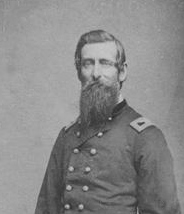
Col. Jacob G. Frick

The Patapsco Guards were integrated into a hastily assembled Union defensive force at Wrightsville, command by Colonel Jacob G. Frick, this force consisted of the 20th, 27th Pennsylvania Emergency Militias, alongside the Philadelphia City Troops, and local civilian militias, which notably included a company of pioneers made up of African-American volunteers from Columbia.

On June 28, 1863, Union troops constructed rifle pits on the western bank of the river. The Patapsco Guard, consisting of 250 men, was placed under the command of Lieutenant Colonel Green and were posted to protect the Union left flank. At approximately 4:30 P.M, Gordon's Confederates, roughly made up of 2,500 infantry, cavalry and artillery, started the attack, with the Confederates placing their artillery on elevated ground and began bombarding the Union rifle pits.

Lacking artillery of their own to return fire, and facing the threat of being flanked by overwhelming numbers, Frick ordered the Union forces to retreat across the bridge to Lancaster County after an hour of holding their positions. To prevent the Confederates from crossing, Colonel Frick ordered the bridges to be burned, which prevented Gordon's troops from crossing the eastern bank via the bridge.

=== Later service ===
After the Gettysburg Campaign, the company would continue its service in Pennsylvania, and would oppose Confederate Brig. Gen. John McCausland's raid into Chambersburg in July 1864, skirmishing with the Confederates near Chambersburg on July 30, just before being burned after it failed to pay a $100,000 extortion demand.

The company was mustered out of service on August 17, 1865.

== Commanders ==
- Captain Thomas S. McGowan (Mustered out on October 17, 1864)
- First Lieutenant John Downey
- Second Lieutenant Allen T. Fort

== See also ==
- List of Union units from Maryland in the American Civil War
- Maryland in the American Civil War
