= 2nd Eastern Shore Infantry Regiment =

2nd Maryland Infantry, Eastern Shore
- Active: October 2, 1861 – February 23, 1865
- Country: United States
- Allegiance: Union
- Branch: United States Army; Union Army
- Type: Infantry
- Engagements: Second Battle of Kernstown

The 2nd Maryland Infantry, Eastern Shore was an infantry regiment that served in the Union Army during the American Civil War.

== Service ==
The 2nd Maryland Infantry, Eastern Shore was organized at Charlestown, Maryland beginning October 2, 1861 and mustered in for three-years service.

The regiment was attached to Dix's Division, Army of the Potomac, to March 1862. Eastern Shore Maryland and Virginia Middle Department, to July 1862. District of Eastern Shore, VIII Corps, Middle Department, to March 1863. 1st Separate Brigade, VIII Corps, to June 1863. Lockwood's Brigade, VIII Corps, to July 1863. 2nd Brigade, 1st Division, XII Corps, Army of the Potomac, July 1863. 2nd Brigade, Maryland Heights, Division of West Virginia, to December 1863. 2nd Brigade, 1st Division, West Virginia, to April 1864. 1st Brigade, 1st Infantry, Division of West Virginia, to July 1864. 2nd Brigade, 1st Infantry Division of West Virginia, to October 1864. Reserve Division, District of Harpers Ferry, West Virginia, to February 1865.

The 2nd Maryland Infantry, Eastern Shore ceased to exist on February 23, 1865 when it was consolidated with the 1st Regiment Eastern Shore Maryland Volunteer Infantry.

== Detailed service ==
Duty on the eastern shore of Maryland until March 1862, and at Baltimore until October 1862. On the eastern shore of Maryland until June 1863. At Baltimore June 1863. Joined Lockwood's Brigade at Frederick, Maryland, July 6, 1863. Pursuit of Lee July 6–14. Falling Waters July 14. Assigned to duty at Maryland Heights July 17. Duty there and guarding the Baltimore & Ohio Railroad until April 1864. Hunter's Expedition to Lynchburg, Virginia, May 26-July 1. Advance on Staunton May 26 – June 6. Action at Piedmont and Mt. Crawford June 5. Occupation of Staunton June 6. Lexington June 12. Buchanan June 14. Liberty June 16. Lynchburg June 17–18. Retreat to the Ohio River June 19 – July 1. Salem June 21. Moved to the Shenandoah Valley July 1–17. Snicker's Gap July 18. Battle of Winchester July 24. Martinsburg July 25. Strasburg August 14–15. Bolivar Heights August 24. Berryville September 3. Guard duty in West Virginia until February 1865.

== Casualties ==
The regiment lost a total of 73 men during service; 10 enlisted men killed or mortally wounded, 1 officer and 62 enlisted men died of disease.

== See also ==
- List of Maryland Civil War Units
- Maryland in the American Civil War
