= 11th Maryland Infantry Regiment =

Military unit on the Union side during the American Civil War

11th Regiment Maryland Volunteer Infantry
- Active: June 16, 1864, to June 15, 1865
- Country: United States
- Allegiance: Union
- Branch: Infantry
- Engagements: Battle of Monocacy

The 11th Maryland Volunteer Infantry Regiment was an infantry regiment that served in the Union Army during the American Civil War.

== Service ==
The 11th Maryland Infantry was organized at Baltimore, Maryland, and mustered in on June 15, 1864, for 100 days under the command of Colonel William T. Landstreet.

The regiment was attached to 3rd Separate Brigade, VIII Corps, Middle Department, to July 1864. 1st Separate Brigade, VIII Corps, to October 1864.

The 11th Maryland Infantry mustered out of the service at Baltimore on June 15, 1865.

== Detailed service ==
Moved to Monocacy Junction July 1, 1864. Guard duty at Monocacy and Mt. Airy, Maryland, until October 1, 1864. Battle of Monocacy July 9. Mustered out October 1, 1864. The regiment reorganized into three companies for one year service in December 1864. Companies A, B, and C were then consolidated with the 1st Eastern Shore Regiment January 1865. Company C on detached service at Relay House, Baltimore & Ohio Railroad. Company I at Baltimore. Rest of the regiment at Fort Delaware.

== Commanders ==
- Colonel William T. Landstreet

== Casualties ==
The regiment lost a total of 29 men during service, all due to disease.

== See also ==
- List of Maryland Civil War Units
- Maryland in the American Civil War
