= Battle of Fort Fisher =

Battle of Fort Fisher may refer to the following battles during the American Civil War:

- First Battle of Fort Fisher, December 24–27, 1864
- Second Battle of Fort Fisher, January 13–15, 1865
