= 1st Maryland Cavalry Regiment =

- Active: April/August, 1861 to August 8, 1865
- Country: United States
- Allegiance: Union
- Branch: Cavalry
- Engagements: Battle of Greenbrier River; Battle of Ball's Bluff; Battle of Hancock; First Battle of Winchester; Battle of Cedar Mountain; First Battle of Rappahannock Station; Second Battle of Bull Run; Battle of Chantilly; Battle of Harpers Ferry; Battle of Fredericksburg (present but not engaged); Chancellorsville Campaign; Stoneman's 1863 Raid; Battle of Brandy Station; Battle of Aldie; Battle of Middleburg; Battle of Gettysburg; Bristoe Campaign; Mine Run Campaign; Second Battle of Deep Bottom; Siege of Petersburg; Battle of Chaffin's Farm; Battle of Darbytown and New Market Roads; Battle of Darbytown Road; Battle of Fair Oaks & Darbytown Road; Appomattox Campaign

Insignia
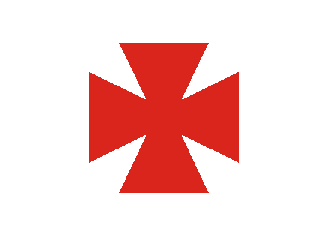
- V Corps (referred to as II Corps Army of Virginia)

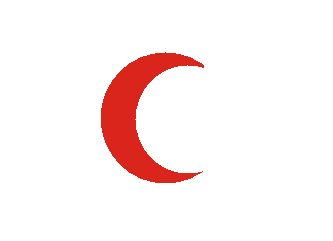
- XI Corps

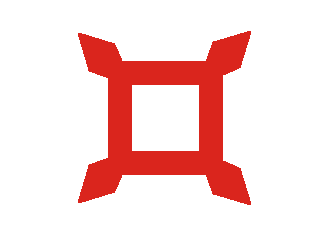
- X Corps

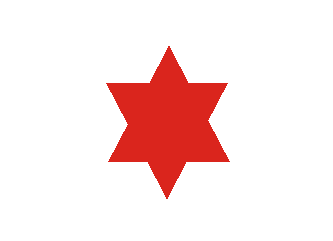
- VIII Corps

The 1st Maryland Cavalry Regiment was a cavalry regiment of the Union Army during the American Civil War.

== Service ==
Companies organized and mustered in between April and August 1861 in Baltimore and Pennsylvania, and served in the Department of West Virginia and the Army of the Potomac; in Hatch's Cavalry Brigade, Department of the Shenandoah, from March, 1862; in the Cavalry Brigade, 2nd Corps (really the old 5th Corps), Army of Virginia, from June 1862; with the Cavalry Brigade, 11th Corps, Army of the Potomac, from September 1862; various brigades/divisions, Cavalry Corps, Army of the Potomac, from January 1863; Provost Marshal General's Command, Army of the Potomac, from October 1863; from June 1864 in 10th Corps, Army of the James, then in the 3rd Brigade of the Cavalry Division, Army of the James, until April, 1865; cavalry and duty in the Department of Virginia until mustered out in August 1865.

The regiment particularly distinguished itself at the cavalry battles of Brandy Station and Gettysburg. During part of its time in 10th Corps, the regiment fought dismounted, and for the remainder was brigaded with the 1st Regiment New York Mounted Rifles.

== Total strength and casualties ==
The regiment lost 3 officers and 65 enlisted men killed or mortally wounded and 3 officers and 130 enlisted men to disease.

== Commanders ==
- Lieutenant Colonel James Monroe Deems (at Gettysburg)

== See also ==
- List of Maryland Civil War units
