= USS Patapsco =

Six ships of the United States Navy have borne the name USS Patapsco, named for the Patapsco River in Maryland.

- USS Patapsco (1799) a sloop laid down as USS Chesapeake, but renamed while under construction.
- USS Patapsco (1806)
- USS Patapsco (1812)
- USS Patapsco (1862) a Passaic-class ironclad monitor during the American Civil War.
- USS Patapsco (AT-10) the lead ship of her class of tugs between 1911 and 1936.
- USS Patapsco (AOG-1) the lead ship of her class of gasoline tankers during World War II, the Korean War and Vietnam.

== See also ==
- Patapsco-class gasoline tanker
