= Battle of Charlestown =

Battle of the American Civil War

- Part of the American Civil War
Date	October 18, 1863
Location	Charles Town, West Virginia 39.29°N 77.86°W
Result	Confederate victory

Belligerents
United States (Union)	CSA (Confederacy)

Commanders and leaders
Benjamin L. Simpson	John D. Imboden

Strength
1,125	1,900

Casualties and losses
452 (22 killed, 50 wounded, 382 captured)	61 (40 killed and wounded, 21 captured)
- Location of the battle in West Virginia

The Battle of Charlestown was a small engagement between Confederate cavalry forces under Brig. Gen. John D. Imboden and the Union forces under Col. Benjamin L. Simpson on October 18, 1863, at Charles Town, West Virginia, as part of the Bristoe and Mine Run Campaigns, resulting in a Confederate victory.

== Background ==
As the Confederate Army of Northern Virginia and the Union Army of the Potomac dueled it out in central Virginia during the Bristoe campaign, General Robert E. Lee dispatched cavalry under Brig. Gen. John Imboden to raid in the Shenandoah Valley and attack the vulnerable Union garrison at Charlestown, West Virginia, in an effort to draw Union forces away from his front. By October 17, Imboden's force had reached Berryville, where they skirmished with a company of the 1st New York Cavalry before driving them back to Charles Town. The presence of the Confederates was reported to Benjamin Simpson, commander of the Charlestown garrison. The inexperienced Simpson, having been mustered into service only 17 days earlier, dismissed recommendations to fall back on the much more strongly defended Harpers Ferry, believing Charles Town was not the target of the Confederate raid.

== Battle ==
At dawn on the 18th, Union pickets south of Charles Town were driven back by Imboden's advance. Simpson's 9th Maryland Infantry, numbering some 375 men, took up position in the Jefferson County Courthouse (in which John Brown was tried and hanged) and ordered the cavalry, consisting of one company each of the Loudoun Rangers and 6th Michigan Cavalry, to "take care of themselves". Upon entering town, Imboden sent a flag of truce to negotiate surrender, to which Simpson refused. The cavalry, seeing the hopelessness of the situation, decided to fight their way out and unite with the Harpers Ferry garrison. On the northeast outskirts of town, the Union cavalry encountered the 18th Virginia Cavalry and 62nd Virginia Mounted Infantry, who unleashed a volley at the column, sending several troopers and their horses to the ground. Those troopers who were still mounted broke left around their felled comrades and serendipitously rode into the Confederate right, which proved to be its weak spot. The Union cavalry cut its way out, taking heavy losses: 17 captured, 2 killed, and several wounded, and nearly every horse shot, several killed.

Meanwhile, back in Charles Town, Imboden brought up his artillery and again demanded the garrison's surrender, which was rebuked for a second time, whereupon Imboden began to shell the town. Under the artillery fire, Simpson was forced to abandon the courthouse and marched his men to a field northwest of town, not far from the earlier cavalry engagement. Imboden massed his forces in the woods facing the field and unleashed a deadly volley. After several minutes and only a few shots fired in return, Simpson finally surrendered his force, now totaling some 365 men.

The artillery fire had not gone unnoticed in nearby Harpers Ferry; the 17th Indiana battery, Cole's Maryland Cavalry, and the remainder of the Loudoun Rangers and 6th Michigan, totaling 300 men in all, were dispatched to reinforce the besieged garrison. Within 15 minutes, they had engaged Imboden's force, and a fierce firefight ensued that lasted the entirety of the afternoon. The reinforcements, however, were not strong enough to drive off Imboden and liberate the prisoners.

At around 5 p.m., the 34th Massachusetts Infantry, 400 strong, arrived, having been marched 18 miles from their camp at Berryville to the sound of the artillery fire. As the sun set, the Bay Staters attacked Imboden, who, with the cover of darkness, elected to withdraw while still in possession of his prisoners and plunder from the town.

== Aftermath ==
Imboden successfully attacked and defeated the Union garrison at Charles Town, exposing the weakness of Union forces in the Shenandoah Valley, taking only light losses. While his raid was successful, it had little overall impact on the fall campaigns, which ended shortly thereafter as the two armies went into winter quarters. For the Union's part, at considerable loss, they saved Charles Town from being sacked and burned and turned back Imboden's raid, which if had been allowed to continue may have had a larger strategic impact on the campaign in central Virginia.
