= John D. Imboden =

American politician and army general (1823–1895)

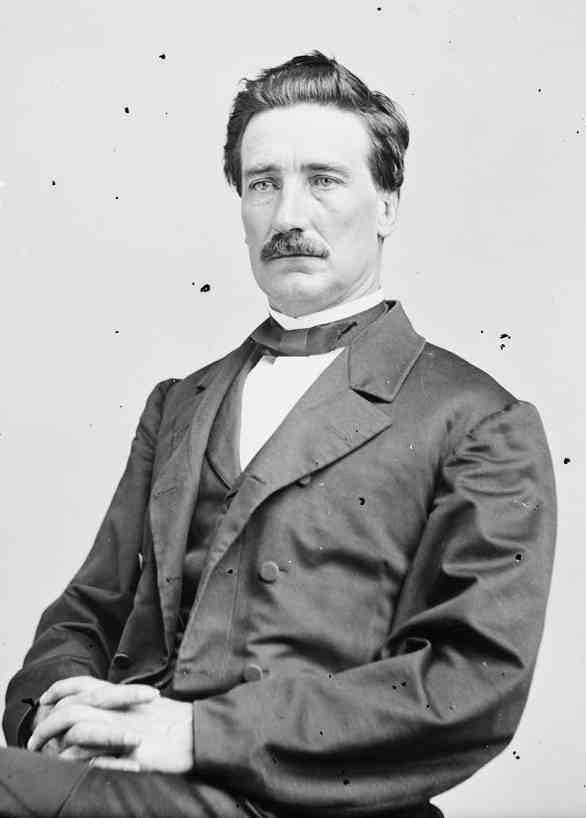
- Imboden c. 1860s

Member of the Virginia House of Delegates from the Augusta County district
- In office December 3, 1855 – December 6, 1857 Serving with Bolivar Christian, Adam McChesney
- Preceded by: Absalom Koiner
- Succeeded by: J. Marshall McCue

Member of the Virginia House of Delegates from the Augusta County district
- In office December 2, 1850 – December 4, 1853 Serving with John McCue, James Walker, John A. Tate
- Preceded by: Hugh W. Sheffey
- Succeeded by: James H. Skinner

Personal details
- Born: February 16, 1823 Staunton, Virginia, US
- Died: August 15, 1895 (aged 72) Damascus, Virginia, US
- Resting place: Hollywood Cemetery (Richmond, Virginia)

Military service
- Allegiance: Confederate States of America
- Branch/service: Confederate States Army
- Years of service: 1861–1865
- Rank: Brigadier General
- Battles/wars: American Civil War; First Battle of Manassas; Gettysburg campaign; Valley Campaigns of 1864

John Daniel Imboden (/ɪmˈboʊdɛn/; February 16, 1823 – August 15, 1895) was an American lawyer, Virginia state legislator, and Confederate army general. During the American Civil War, he commanded an irregular cavalry force. After the war, he resumed practicing law, became a writer, and was active in land development founding the town of Damascus, Virginia.

== Early and family life ==
Imboden was born near Staunton, Virginia, in the Shenandoah Valley to farmer George William Imboden and Isabella Wunderlich who bore eleven children. His father fought in the War of 1812. Imboden received a private education locally at the Staunton Academy, then in 1841–1842 he attended Washington College. By 1850, John and his brother Frank no longer lived on the family farm, which his father worked with the help of his younger brothers George, James, Jacob, and a white hired hand named Robert Walkey; his sisters Eliza and Frances helped their mother at the home.

== Early career ==
He took a job teaching at the Virginia School for the Deaf and the Blind in Staunton. Imboden also read law, was admitted to the Virginia bar, and entered into partnership with William Frazier to create a law firm. In December 1844, Imboden became a member of the Staunton Masonic lodge, Number 13, Ancient Free and Accepted Masons (A.F. & A.M.) In the 1850 Federal census, Imboden owned four slaves, a 16-year-old mulatto male, a 23-year-old black female and 12- and three-year-old girls. His slaveholdings increased to 7 in 1860, the mulatto male becoming 26 years old, and working alongside two 20-year-old black women, a 24-year-old black woman and black boys aged 6 and 14 as well as a 14-year-old black girl.

Augusta County voters elected Imboden as one of their two (part-time) delegates in the House of Delegates in 1850, alongside veteran John Marshall McCue. As a result of greater representation accorded western Virginia counties and the 1850 census, Augusta county was allocated a third delegate in 1852, so as the third-highest vote-getter that year, Imboden was re-elected, this time serving alongside James Walker and John A. Tate. However, Augusta County voters selected three other men in 1853, although Imboden again was the third highest vote-getter and returned to the legislature in 1855, this time alongside Boliver Christian and Adam McChesney. Imboden again failed to win re-election in 1857. In response to John Brown's Raid at Harper's Ferry, Imboden helped found the Staunton Light Artillery, partially funding it as his own expense. His younger brother George W. Imboden had followed his path into the law and also joined the artillery militia. Despite his lack of formal military training, J.D. Imboden was commissioned as captain in the Staunton Artillery of the Virginia State Militia on November 28, 1859.

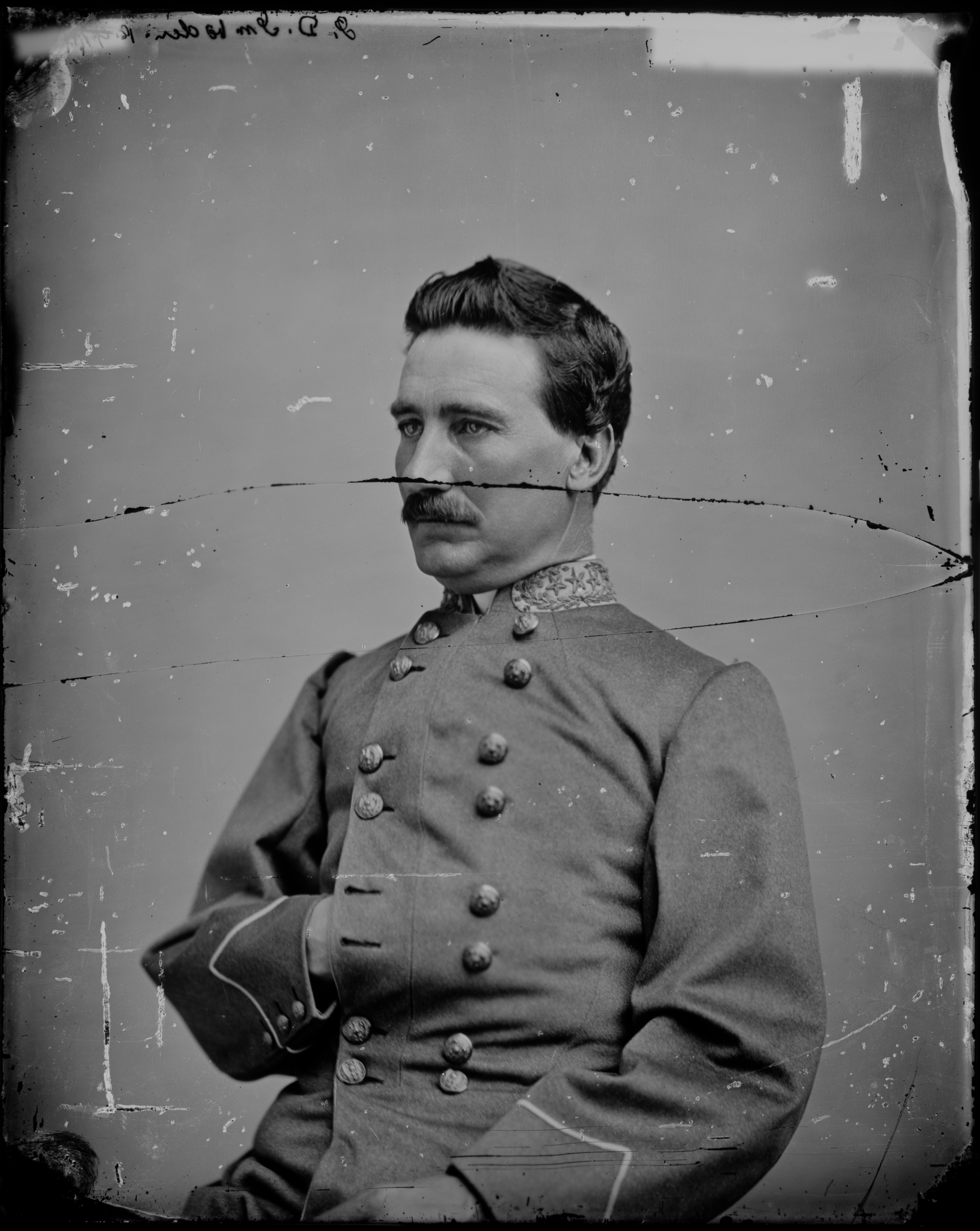
John Daniel Imboden in military uniform

== Secession and Civil War ==
As the Virginia Secession Convention of 1861 appeared ready to pass the ordinance of secession, ex-Governor Henry Wise called a meeting of several militia commanders, Capt. A.M. Barbour (former civil superintendent of the Harper's Ferry Arsenal) and Richmond Enquirer editor Nat Tyler, to plan to capture the U.S. Army arsenal at Harpers Ferry. Imboden attended, as did Capt. John A. Harman of Staunton's infantry militia, as well as cavalry militia captains Turner and Richard Ashby of Fauquier County and Oliver R. Funsten of Clarke County. Imboden telegraphed Staunton's militia companies to meet in Staunton at 4p.m. on April 17 for orders. The group arranged railroad transportation to Charles Town about 8 miles from the Harpers Ferry arsenal. However, Governor John Letcher refused to authorized the action until the secession ordinance passed. As soon as it did, A.M. Barbour went to Harpers Ferry and publicly informed the workmen. Then, the evening after the secession ordinance passed, 360 men started out to capture the arsenal, defended by U.S. Army Lt. Roger Jones with 50 soldiers and about 15 volunteers. Vastly outnumbered, they attempted to set fire to the buildings and equipment as they retreated north to Carlisle, Pennsylvania. Imboden's artillery had set up on the heights above the arsenal, but did not see further action, although Imboden later bragged about converting some of the captured horse carts to caissons. Virginia militia Major General Kenton Harper (of Staunton) then secured the towns, and on April 27, Major Thomas J. "Stonewall" Jackson arrived to organize the militia into regiments.

On July 1, 1861, the Staunton Light Artillery, with its four bronze, 6-pounder guns and 107 officers and men, was formally mustered in the Confederate States Army. While commanding his artillery battery at the First Battle of Bull Run, Imboden perforated his left eardrum firing an artillery piece, causing subsequent deafness in that ear. He fought with Major general Jackson in the Valley Campaign at Cross Keys and Port Republic. On September 9, 1862, Imboden left the artillery to recruit a battalion of partisan rangers and was promoted to colonel of the 62nd Virginia Mounted Infantry (1st Partisan Rangers). He was promoted to brigadier general on January 28, 1863.

Upset by the independence movement in West Virginia, the voters of which petitioned to separate from Virginia, Imboden with Brig. Gen. William E. "Grumble" Jones led 3,400 partisan rangers into northwestern Virginia. The Jones-Imboden Raid destroyed rail track and bridges of the Baltimore and Ohio Railroad, as well as captured thousands of horses and heads of cattle and ruined petroleum fields in the Kanawha Valley. The raiders covered 400 miles (640 km) in 37 days but failed to stop West Virginia's statehood.

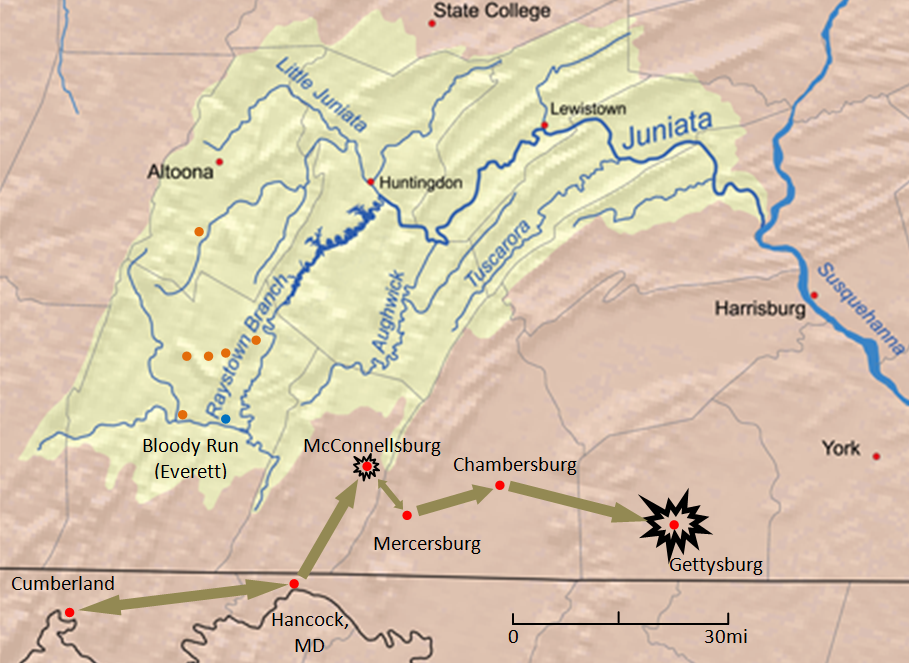
Imboden's actions before Battle of Gettysburg

In the Gettysburg campaign, Imboden's brigade served under Maj. Gen. J.E.B. Stuart guarding the left flank for Gen. Robert E. Lee's movement north through the Shenandoah Valley. (His brigade did not participate in Stuart's foray away from Lee's army, but instead raided the Baltimore and Ohio Railroad between Martinsburg, West Virginia, and Cumberland, Maryland.) During the Battle of Gettysburg, Imboden's men stayed in the rear and guarded ammunition and supply trains in Chambersburg, Pennsylvania. During the Confederate retreat, Imboden escorted the wagon trains with thousands of wounded soldiers back to Virginia. On July 6, 1863, the Potomac River flooding at Williamsport, Maryland, trapped Imboden's wagon train. He put together a defensive force that included an artillery battery and as many of the wounded who could operate muskets. This hastily organized force turned back attacks from Union cavalry generals John Buford and Judson Kilpatrick, saving the wagon train. Robert E. Lee praised Imboden for the way in which he "gallantly repulsed" the Union cavalry.

Returning to the Shenandoah Valley, Imboden responded to a request from General Lee to distract the enemy in his front by leading a raid on the vulnerable Union detachment at Charles Town, West Virginia, on October 18, 1863, at the Battle of Charlestown. Imboden reported,

The surprise was complete, the enemy having no suspicion of our approach until I had the town entirely surrounded. ... To my demand for a surrender Colonel Simpson requested an hour for consideration. I offered him five minutes, to which he replied, 'Take us if you can'. I immediately opened on the buildings with artillery at less than 200 yards, and with half a dozen shells drove out the enemy into the streets, when he formed and fled toward Harper's Ferry.

Union Brig. Gen. Jeremiah Cutler Sullivan soon sent a rescue column from nearby Harpers Ferry and drove Imboden back up the valley. Sullivan reported, "The cavalry came up with the enemy this side of Charlestown, and drove them through the town. Artillery coming up, drove them about 4 miles. A portion of infantry force ... , reaching them, the enemy were driven from every position they took, to near Berryville."

Imboden and John C. Breckinridge's forces defeated Union Maj. Gen. Franz Sigel's command at the Battle of New Market on May 15, 1864. He returned to Virginia and commanded a brigade in Maj. Gen. Robert Ransom's cavalry division of the Second Corps of the Army of Northern Virginia under Lt. Gen. Jubal A. Early in the Valley Campaigns of 1864, including the losses at the Battle of Fisher's Hill and the Battle of Cedar Creek. Incapacitated by typhoid fever by the autumn of 1864, Imboden left the active cavalry service.

Beginning on January 2, 1865, Imboden commanded Camp Millen, Georgia, then the prison camp at Aiken, South Carolina as well as other prison camps in Georgia, Alabama, and Mississippi throughout 1865 until the end of the war. He was paroled in Augusta, Georgia on May 3 of that year.

== Postbellum ==
After the war, Imboden moved to Richmond, Virginia, where he resumed his work as a lawyer, serving first in Richmond and then in Abingdon, the county seat of Washington County. His brother George moved to West Virginia, where he invested in land and coal, becoming a prominent businessman and legislator. John Imboden also advocated development of Virginia's natural resources and transportation infrastructure. In 1872 he published The Coal and Iron Resources of Virginia: Their Extent, Commercial Value, and Early Development Considered. Around 1875, he moved to southwestern Virginia where he hoped to mine coal and iron ore deposits. He founded the town of Damascus, Virginia, which became a lumber center in the late 19th and early 20th century. John D. Imboden also participated in Confederate veterans activities and the Lost Cause movement. He published several articles and books about the Civil War, and also contributed to The War of the Rebellion: A Compilation of the Official Records of the Union and Confederate Armies (128 vols., 1880–1901).

In 1876, he became a commissioner of the Centennial International Exposition in Philadelphia, Pennsylvania, and in 1893, he was a commissioner of the World's Columbian Exposition in Chicago. In the winter of 1879–1880, Imboden traveled to Pittsburgh, Pennsylvania, to meet with potential investors for coal operations in Wise County, Virginia. He persuaded the investors to begin operations with the region, leading to the chartering of the Tinsalia Coal Company, and later the Virginia Coal & Iron Company. Imboden then worked as a land agent for the company, securing property and mineral rights. One of the coal camps in Wise County, Imboden, is named after him.

== Death and legacy ==
Imboden died in Damascus in 1895, and is buried in the Generals section of Hollywood Cemetery in Richmond, Virginia.

== Family ==
During his life, Imboden was married five times; five out of his nine children were alive at the time of his death in 1895. On June 16, 1845, Imboden married Eliza "Dice" Allen McCue, who was a daughter of Colonel Franklin McCue. The Imbodens built a house in Staunton which they called the "Ingleside Cottage". They had four children, one died before reaching three years. On December 23, 1857, his wife of twelve years died. On May 12, 1859, Imboden married Mary Wilson McPhail, who gave birth to three children. Later, he married Edna Porter, then Anna Lockett, and finally Florence Crockett.

== Works ==
- Imboden, John D. Organized and Authorized Partisan Rangers. Staunton, Va., 1862. (Recruiting pamphlet)
- Imboden, John D. Virginia, the Home for the Northern Farmer: Three Letters from Gen. J.d. Imboden, Domestic Agent of Immigration for the State of Virginia, to Hon. Horace Greeley. New York: D. Taylor, 1869.
- Imboden, John D. Lee at Gettysburg. New York, 1871.
- Imboden, John D. Reminiscences of Lee and Jackson. New York, 1871.
- Imboden, John D. The Coal and Iron Resources of Virginia: Their Extent, Commercial Value, and Early Development Considered. a Paper Read Before a Meeting of Members of the Legislature and Prominent Citizens in the Capitol at Richmond, February 19th, 1872. Richmond: Clemmitt & Jones, printers, 1872.
- Imboden, John D. Important to All Interested in Virginia, U.S. London: Foreign and Colonial Estates Exchange Agency, 1873.
- Imboden, John D. Jackson at Harper's Ferry in 1861. In Battles and Leaders of the Civil War, ed. by Robert U. Johnson and Clarence C. Buel (1884–1887). 1.1 (1884): 111–125.
- Imboden, John D. Coal and Coke: Coal Interests of South Western Virginia. s.l., 1894.

== See also ==
- Imboden, Virginia
- List of American Civil War generals (Confederate)
