= 1st Eastern Shore Infantry Regiment =

1st Regiment Eastern Shore Maryland Volunteer Infantry
- Maryland state flag
- Active: September, 1861, to February 23, 1865
- Country: United States
- Allegiance: Union
- Branch: United States Army; Union Army
- Type: Infantry
- Engagements: Battle of Gettysburg

The 1st Regiment Eastern Shore Maryland Volunteer Infantry was an infantry regiment that served in the Union Army during the American Civil War.

== Organization ==
The regiment was organized at Cambridge, Maryland in September 1861. Enlistments were for 3 years.

Companies A, B and C were recruited in Dorchester County, Companies D, E, F and G in Caroline County, Company H in Talbot County, Company I at Baltimore City, and Company K in Somerset County.

Once formed, the regiment was attached to Major General John Adams Dix's division of the Army of the Potomac. It was assigned to the Eastern Shore of Maryland.

The regiment was originally commanded by Colonel James Wallace, a slaveowning lawyer and state legislator from Cambridge.

== Service ==
In the fall of 1861, Dix led an expeditionary force, including the 1st Maryland Eastern Shore, south to occupy the Virginia counties of Accomack and Northampton.

In January, 1863, the regiment was attached to the VIII Corps.

“The 1st Maryland Confederate Regiment met us and were cut to pieces. We sorrowfully gathered up many of our old friends and acquaintances and had them carefully and tenderly cared for.”

— Colonel James Wallace, 1st Maryland Eastern Shore, on the confederate assault on Culp's Hill at the Battle of Gettysburg.

When Lee invaded Pennsylvania in the summer of 1863, the regiment was attached to Brig. Gen. Henry H. Lockwood’s Brigade of the XII Corps of the Army of the Potomac and sent north to Pennsylvania. The regiment arrived at the Battle of Gettysburg on the morning of July 3 and engaged the 1st Maryland Infantry, CSA on Culp's Hill, suffering 5 dead, 16 wounded, and 2 missing, out of 583 total men.

At Gettysburg, Color Sergeant Robert Ross of the Union 1st Maryland Eastern Shore regiment was a cousin to Color Sergeant P.M. Moore of the Confederate 1st Maryland regiment, who was wounded several times.

In December 1863, Colonel Wallace resigned his command over the issue of enlisting African-Americans in the army.

The 1st Regiment Eastern Shore Maryland Volunteer Infantry was eventually consolidated into the 11th Regiment Maryland Volunteer Infantry.
