= Maryland in the American Civil War =

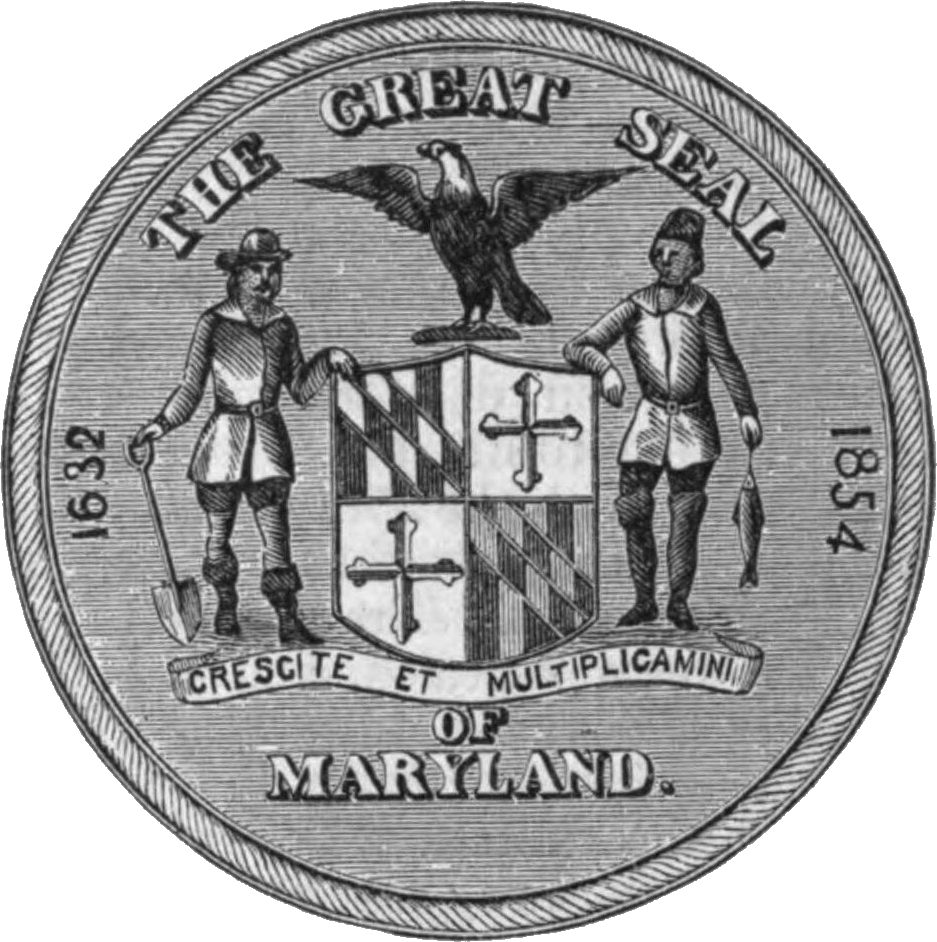
Seal of Maryland during the war, with the state's then-motto of crescite et multiplicamini

During the American Civil War (1861–1865), Maryland, a slave state, was one of the southern border states, meaning that it shared a border with a non slave-holding state of the North. Despite some popular support for the cause of the Confederate States of America, Maryland did not secede during the Civil War. Governor Thomas H. Hicks, despite his early sympathies for the South, helped prevent the state from seceding.

Because the state bordered the District of Columbia and the opposing factions within the state strongly desired to sway public opinion towards their respective causes, Maryland played an important role in the war. The Presidency of Abraham Lincoln (1861–1865) suspended the constitutional right of habeas corpus from Washington to Philadelphia. Lincoln ignored the ruling of Chief Justice Roger B. Taney in "Ex parte Merryman" decision in 1861 concerning freeing John Merryman, a prominent Southern sympathizer arrested by the military.

The first fatalities of the war happened during the Baltimore riot of 1861 on April 18–19. The single bloodiest day of combat in American military history occurred during the first major Confederate invasion of the North in the Maryland Campaign, just north above the Potomac River near Sharpsburg in Washington County, at the Battle of Antietam on September 17, 1862. The battle of Antietam, though tactically a draw, was strategically enough of a Union victory to give Lincoln the opportunity to issue, in September 1862, the Emancipation Proclamation. It did not affect Maryland. In July 1864 the Battle of Monocacy was fought near Frederick, Maryland as part of the Valley Campaigns of 1864. Monocacy was a tactical victory for the Confederate States Army but a strategic defeat, as the one-day delay inflicted on the attacking Confederates cost rebel General Jubal Early his chance to capture the Union capital of Washington, D.C.

Across the state, some 50,000 citizens signed up for the military, with most joining the United States Army. Approximately a tenth as many enlisted were to "go South" and fight for the Confederacy. Abolition of slavery in Maryland came before the end of the war, with a new third constitution voted approval in 1864 by a small majority of Radical Republican Unionists then controlling the nominally Democratic state.

== The approach of war ==
=== Maryland's sympathies ===
8th Massachusetts regiment repairing railroad bridges from Annapolis to Washington.

Maryland, as a slave-holding border state, was deeply divided over the antebellum arguments over states' rights and the future of slavery in the Union. Culturally, geographically and economically, Maryland was a unique blend of Southern agrarianism and Northern mercantilism. In the leadup to the American Civil War, it became clear that the state was bitterly divided in its sympathies. There was much less appetite for secession than elsewhere in the Southern States (South Carolina, Mississippi, Florida, Georgia, Alabama, Louisiana, Texas, Virginia, North Carolina, Arkansas, Tennessee) or in the border Southern states (Kentucky and Missouri) of the Upper South, but Maryland was equally unsympathetic towards the potentially abolitionist position of Republican candidate Abraham Lincoln. In the presidential election of 1860 Lincoln won just 2,294 votes out of a total of 92,421, only 2.5% of the votes cast, coming in at a distant fourth place with Southern Democrat (and later Confederate general) John C. Breckinridge winning the state. In seven counties, Lincoln received not a single vote.

The areas of Southern and Eastern Shore Maryland, especially those on the Chesapeake Bay (which neighbored Virginia), which had prospered on the tobacco trade and slave labor, were generally sympathetic to the South, while the central and western areas of the state, especially Marylanders of German origin, had stronger economic ties to the North and thus were pro-Union. Not all blacks in Maryland were slaves. The 1860 Federal Census showed there were nearly as many free blacks (83,942) as slaves (87,189) in Maryland, although the latter were much more dominant in southern counties.

However, across the state, sympathies were mixed. Many Marylanders were simply pragmatic, recognizing that the state's long border with the Union state of Pennsylvania would be almost impossible to defend in the event of war. Maryland businessmen feared the likely loss of trade that would be caused by war and the strong possibility of a blockade of Baltimore's port by the Union Navy. Other residents, and a majority of the legislature, wished to remain in the Union, but did not want to be involved in a war against their southern neighbors, and sought to prevent a military response by Lincoln to the South's secession.

After John Brown's raid on Harpers Ferry in 1859, many citizens began forming local militias, determined to prevent a future slave uprising.

=== Baltimore Riot of 1861 ===
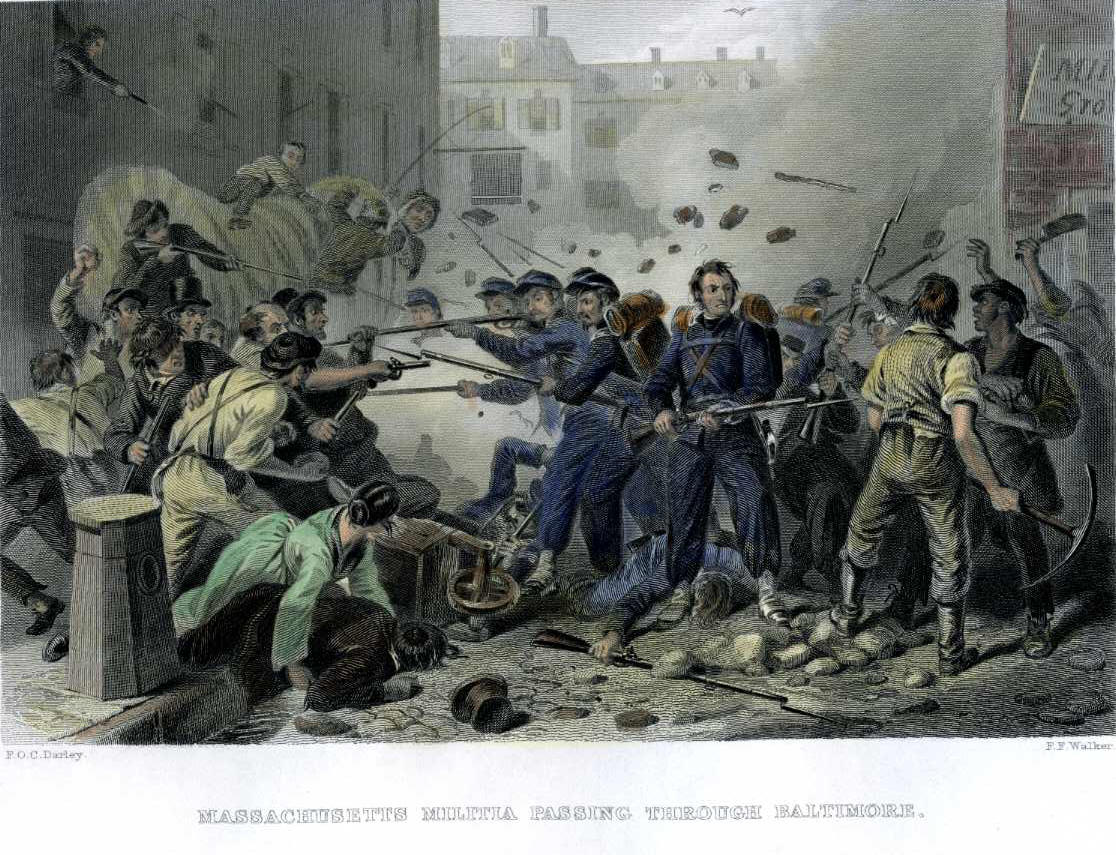
The Baltimore Riot of April 1861

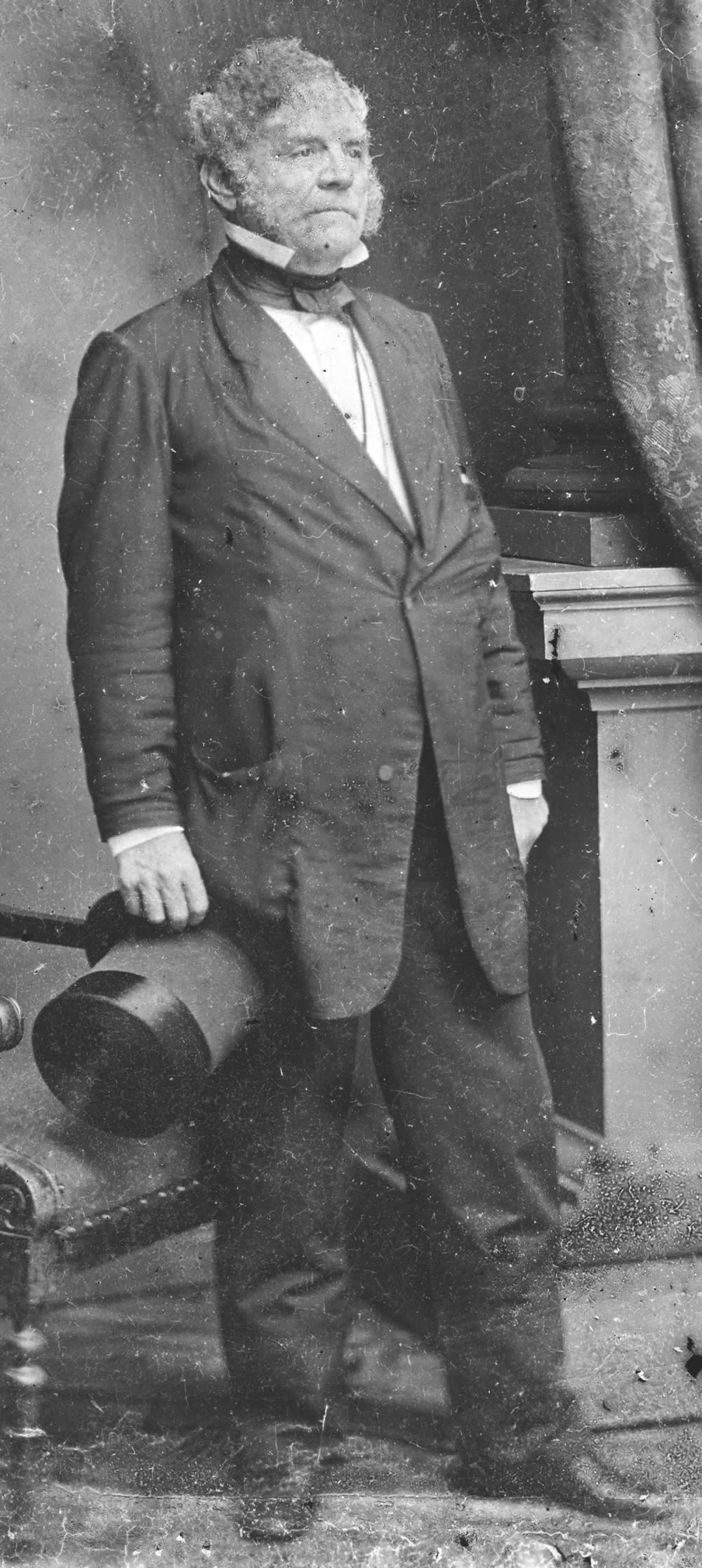
Governor Thomas Hicks

The first bloodshed of the Civil War occurred in Maryland. Anxious about the risk of secessionists capturing Washington, D.C., given that the capital was bordered by Virginia, and preparing for war with the South, the federal government requested armed volunteers to suppress "unlawful combinations" in the South. Soldiers from Pennsylvania and Massachusetts were transported by rail to Baltimore, where they had to disembark, march through the city, and board another train to continue their journey south to Washington.

As one Massachusetts regiment was transferred between stations on April 19, a mob of Marylanders sympathizing with the South, or objecting to the use of federal troops against the seceding states, attacked the train cars and blocked the route; some began throwing cobblestones and bricks at the troops, assaulting them with "shouts and stones". Panicked by the situation, several soldiers fired into the mob, whether "accidentally", "in a desultory manner", or "by the command of the officers" is unclear. Chaos ensued as a giant brawl began between fleeing soldiers, the violent mob, and the Baltimore police who tried to suppress the violence. Four soldiers and twelve civilians were killed in the riot.

The disorder inspired James Ryder Randall, a Marylander living in Louisiana, to write a poem which would be put to music and, in 1939, become the state song, "Maryland, My Maryland" (it remained the official state song until March 2021). The song's lyrics urged Marylanders to "spurn the Northern scum" and "burst the tyrant's chain" – in other words, to secede from the Union. Confederate States Army bands would later play the song after they crossed into Maryland territory during the Maryland Campaign in 1862.

After the April 19 rioting, skirmishes continued in Baltimore for the next month. Mayor George William Brown and Maryland Governor Thomas Hicks implored President Lincoln to reroute troops around Baltimore city and through Annapolis to avoid further confrontations. In a letter to President Lincoln, Mayor Brown wrote:

It is my solemn duty to inform you that it is not possible for more soldiers to pass through Baltimore unless they fight their way at every step. I therefore hope and trust and most earnestly request that no more troops be permitted or ordered by the Government to pass through the city. If they should attempt it, the responsibility for the bloodshed will not rest upon me.

Hearing no immediate reply from Washington, on the evening of April 19 Governor Hicks and Mayor Brown ordered the destruction of railroad bridges leading into the city from the North, preventing further incursions by Union soldiers. The destruction was accomplished the next day. One of the men involved in this destruction would be arrested for it in May without recourse to habeas corpus, leading to the ex parte Merryman ruling. For a time it looked as if Maryland was one provocation away from joining the rebels, but Lincoln moved swiftly to defuse the situation, promising that the troops were needed purely to defend Washington, not to attack the South. President Lincoln also complied with the request to reroute troops to Annapolis, as the political situation in Baltimore remained highly volatile. Meanwhile, General Winfield Scott, who was in charge of military operations in Maryland indicated in correspondence with the head of Pennsylvania troops that the route through Baltimore would resume once sufficient troops were available to secure Baltimore.

=== To secede or not to secede ===
Despite some popular support for the cause of the Confederate States of America, Maryland did not secede during the Civil War. However, a number of leading citizens, including physician and slaveholder Richard Sprigg Steuart, placed considerable pressure on Governor Hicks to summon the state Legislature to vote on secession, following Hicks to Annapolis with a number of fellow citizens:

to insist on his [Hicks] issuing his proclamation for the Legislature to convene, believing that this body (and not himself and his party) should decide the fate of our state...if the Governor and his party continued to refuse this demand that it would be necessary to depose him.

Responding to pressure, on April 22 Governor Hicks finally announced that the state legislature would meet in a special session in Frederick, a strongly pro-Union town, rather than the state capital of Annapolis. The Maryland General Assembly convened in Frederick and unanimously adopted a measure stating that they would not commit the state to secession, explaining that they had "no constitutional authority to take such action," whatever their own personal feelings might have been. On April 29, the Legislature voted decisively 53–13 against secession, though they also voted not to reopen rail links with the North, and they requested that Lincoln remove Union troops from Maryland. At this time the legislature seems to have wanted to avoid involvement in a war against its southern neighbors.

=== Imposition of martial law ===
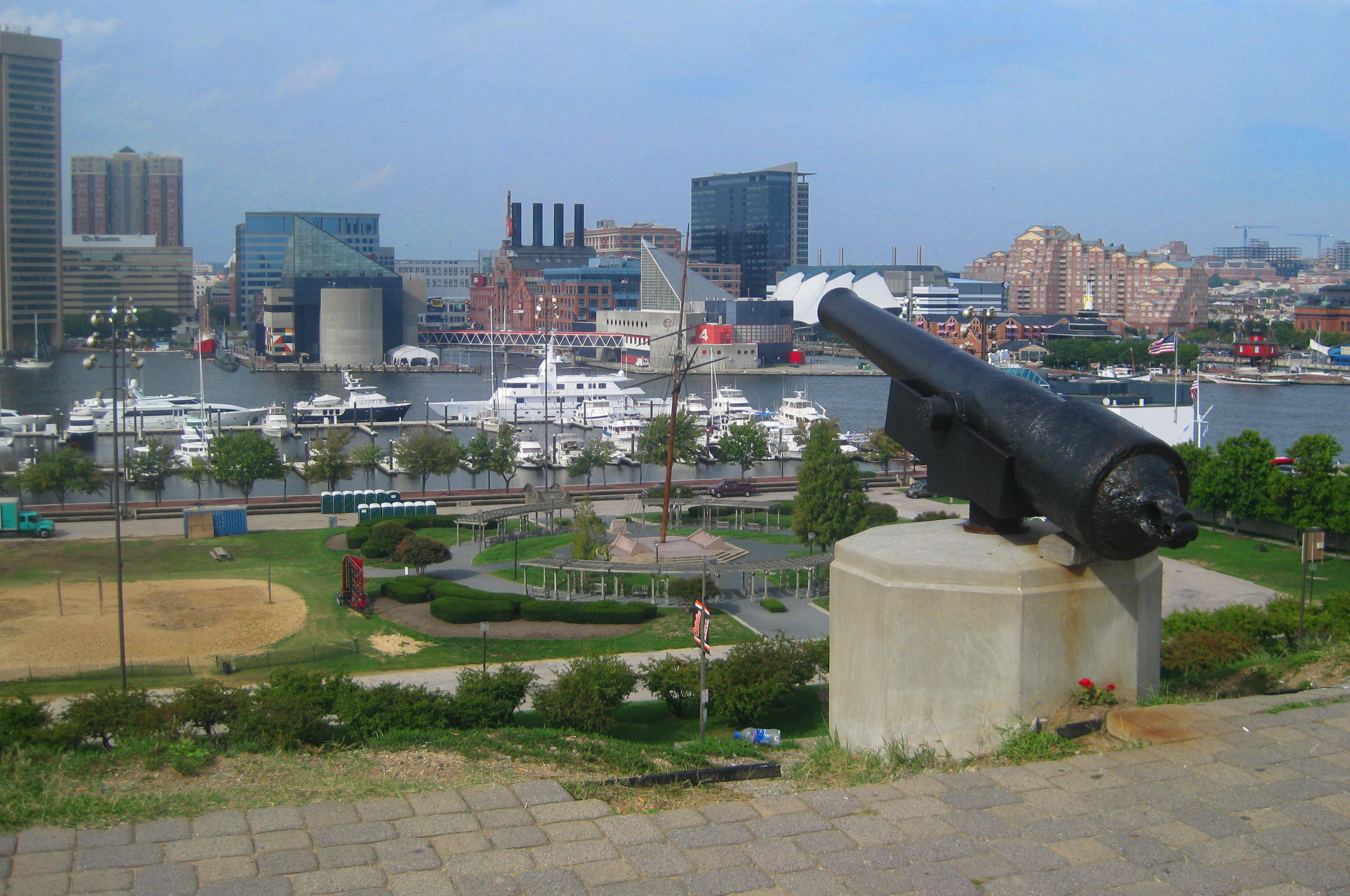
Cannon on Federal Hill, aimed at downtown Baltimore

On May 13, 1861, General Benjamin F. Butler entered Baltimore by rail with 1,000 Federal soldiers and, under cover of a thunderstorm, quietly took possession of Federal Hill. Butler fortified his position and trained his guns upon the city, threatening its destruction. Butler then sent a letter to the commander of Fort McHenry:

I have taken possession of Baltimore. My troops are on Federal Hill, which I can hold with the aid of my artillery. If I am attacked to-night, please open upon Monument Square with your mortars.

Butler went on to occupy Baltimore and declared martial law, ostensibly to prevent secession, although Maryland had voted solidly (53–13) against secession two weeks earlier, but more immediately to allow war to be made on the South without hindrance from the state of Maryland, which had also voted to close its rail lines to Northern troops, so as to avoid involvement in a war against its southern neighbors. By May 21 there was no need to send further troops. After the occupation of the city, Union troops were garrisoned throughout the state. By late summer Maryland was firmly in the hands of Union soldiers. Arrests of Confederate sympathizers and those critical of Lincoln and the war soon followed, and Steuart's brother, the militia general George H. Steuart, fled to Charlottesville, Virginia, after which much of his family's property was confiscated by the Federal Government. Civil authority in Baltimore was swiftly withdrawn from all those who had not been steadfastly in favor of the Federal Government's emergency measures.

During this period in spring 1861, Baltimore Mayor Brown, the city council, the police commissioner, and the entire Board of Police were arrested and imprisoned at Fort McHenry without charges. One of those arrested was militia captain John Merryman, who was held without trial in defiance of a writ of habeas corpus on May 25, sparking the case of Ex parte Merryman, heard just 2 days later on May 27 and 28. In this case U.S. Supreme Court Chief Justice, and native Marylander, Roger B. Taney, acting as a federal circuit court judge, ruled that the arrest of Merryman was unconstitutional without Congressional authorization, which Lincoln could not then secure:

The President, under the Constitution and laws of the United States, cannot suspend the privilege of the writ of habeas corpus, nor authorize any military officer to do so.

The Merryman decision created a sensation, but its immediate impact was rather limited, as the president simply ignored the ruling. Indeed, when Lincoln's dismissal of Chief Justice Taney's ruling was criticized in a September 1861 editorial by Baltimore newspaper editor Frank Key Howard (Francis Scott Key's grandson), Howard was himself arrested by order of Lincoln's Secretary of State Seward and held without trial. Howard described these events in his 1863 book Fourteen Months in American Bastiles, where he noted that he was imprisoned in Fort McHenry, the same fort where the Star Spangled Banner had been waving "o'er the land of the free" in his grandfather's song. Two of the publishers selling his book were then arrested. In all nine newspapers were shut down in Maryland by the federal government, and a dozen newspaper owners and editors like Howard were imprisoned without charges.

On September 17, 1861, the first day of the Maryland legislature's new session, fully one third of the members of the Maryland General Assembly were arrested, due to federal concerns that the Assembly "would aid the anticipated rebel invasion and would attempt to take the state out of the Union." Although previous secession votes, in spring 1861, had failed by large margins, there were legitimate concerns that the war-averse Assembly would further impede the federal government's use of Maryland infrastructure to wage war on the South.

One month later in October 1861 one John Murphy asked the United States Circuit Court for the District of Columbia to issue a writ of habeas corpus for his son, then in the United States Army, on the grounds that he was underage. When the writ was delivered to General Andrew Porter Provost Marshal of the District of Columbia he had both the lawyer delivering the writ and the United States Circuit Judge, Marylander William Matthew Merrick, who issued the writ, arrested to prevent them from proceeding in the case United States ex rel. Murphy v. Porter. Merrick's fellow judges took up the case and ordered General Porter to appear before them, but Lincoln's Secretary of State Seward prevented the federal marshal from delivering the court order. The court objected that this disruption of its process was unconstitutional, but noted that it was powerless to enforce its prerogatives.

The following month in November 1861, Judge Richard Bennett Carmichael, a presiding state circuit court judge in Maryland, was imprisoned without charge for releasing, due to his concern that arrests were arbitrary and civil liberties had been violated, many of the southern sympathizers seized in his jurisdiction. The order came again from Lincoln's Secretary of State Seward. The federal troops executing Judge Carmichael's arrest beat him unconscious in his courthouse while his court was in session, before dragging him out, initiating a public controversy.

In another controversial arrest that fall, and in further defiance of Chief Justice Taney's ruling, a sitting U.S. Congressman Henry May (D-Maryland) was imprisoned without charge and without recourse to habeas corpus in Fort Lafayette. May was eventually released and returned to his seat in Congress in December 1861, and in March 1862 he introduced a bill to Congress requiring the federal government to either indict by grand jury or release all other "political prisoners" still held without habeas. The provisions of May's bill were included in the March 1863 Habeas Corpus Act, in which Congress finally authorized Lincoln to suspend habeas corpus, but required actual indictments for suspected traitors.

=== Marylanders fought both for the Union and the Confederacy ===
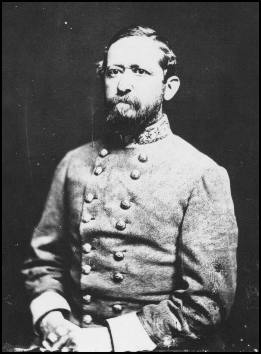
Arnold Elzey, colonel of the 1st Maryland Infantry, CSA, promoted by Confederate President Jefferson Davis to brigadier general after the First Battle of Manassas.

Although Maryland stayed as part of the Union and more Marylanders fought for the Union than for the Confederacy, Marylanders sympathetic to the secession easily crossed the Potomac River into secessionist Virginia in order to join and fight for the Confederacy. During the early summer of 1861, several thousand Marylanders crossed the Potomac to join the Confederate Army. Most of the men enlisted into regiments from Virginia or the Carolinas, but six companies of Marylanders formed at Harpers Ferry into the Maryland Battalion. Among them were members of the former volunteer militia unit, the Maryland Guard Battalion, initially formed in Baltimore in 1859.

Maryland Exiles, including Arnold Elzey and brigadier general George H. Steuart, would organize a "Maryland Line" in the Army of Northern Virginia which eventually consisted of one infantry regiment, one infantry battalion, two cavalry battalions and four battalions of artillery. Most of these volunteers tended to hail from southern and eastern counties of the state, while northern and western Maryland furnished more volunteers for the Union armies.

Captain Bradley T. Johnson refused the offer of the Virginians to join a Virginia Regiment, insisting that Maryland should be represented independently in the Confederate army. It was agreed that Arnold Elzey, a seasoned career officer from Maryland, would command the 1st Maryland Regiment. His executive officer was the Marylander George H. Steuart, who would later be known as "Maryland Steuart" to distinguish him from his more famous cavalry colleague J.E.B. Stuart.

The 1st Maryland Infantry Regiment was officially formed on June 16, 1861, and, on June 25, two additional companies joined the regiment in Winchester. Its initial term of duty was for twelve months.

It has been estimated that, of the state's 1860 population of 687,000, about 4,000 Marylanders traveled south to fight for the Confederacy. While the number of Marylanders in Confederate service is often reported as 20–25,000 based on an oral statement of General Cooper to General Trimble, other contemporary reports refute this number and offer more detailed estimates in the range of 3,500 (Livermore) to just under 4,700 (McKim), which latter number should be further reduced given that the 2nd Maryland Infantry raised in 1862 consisted largely of the same men who had served in the 1st Maryland, which mustered out after a year.

While other men born in Maryland may have served in other Confederate formations, the same is true of units in the service of the United States. The 1860 Census reported the chief destinations of internal immigrants from Maryland as Ohio and Pennsylvania, followed by Virginia and the District of Columbia.

A similar situation existed in relation to Marylanders serving in the United States Colored Troops. Indeed, on the whole there appear to have been twice as many black Marylanders serving in the U.S.C.T. as white Marylanders in the Confederate army.

Overall, the Official Records of the War Department credits Maryland with 33,995 white enlistments in volunteer regiments of the United States Army and 8,718 African American enlistments in the United States Colored Troops. A further 3,925 Marylanders, not differentiated by race, served as sailors or marines. One notable Maryland front line regiment was the 2nd Maryland Infantry Regiment, which saw considerable combat action in the Union IX Corps. Another was the 4th United States Colored Troops, whose Sergeant Major, Christian Fleetwood was awarded the Medal of Honor for rallying the regiment and saving its colors in the successful assault on New Market Heights.

=== A state divided ===
Not all those who sympathised with the rebels would abandon their homes and join the Confederacy. Some, like physician Richard Sprigg Steuart, remained in Maryland, offered covert support for the South, and refused to sign an oath of loyalty to the Union. Later in 1861, Baltimore resident W W Glenn described Steuart as a fugitive from the authorities:

I was spending the evening out when a footstep approached my chair from behind and a hand was laid upon me. I turned and saw Dr. R. S. Steuart. He has been concealed for more than six months. His neighbors are so bitter against him that he dare not go home, and he committed himself so decidedly on the 19th April and is known to be so decided a Southerner, that it more than likely he would be thrown into a Fort. He goes about from place to place, sometimes staying in one county, sometimes in another and then passing a few days in the city. He never shows in the day time & is cautious who sees him at any time.

== Civil War ==
=== Battle of Front Royal ===
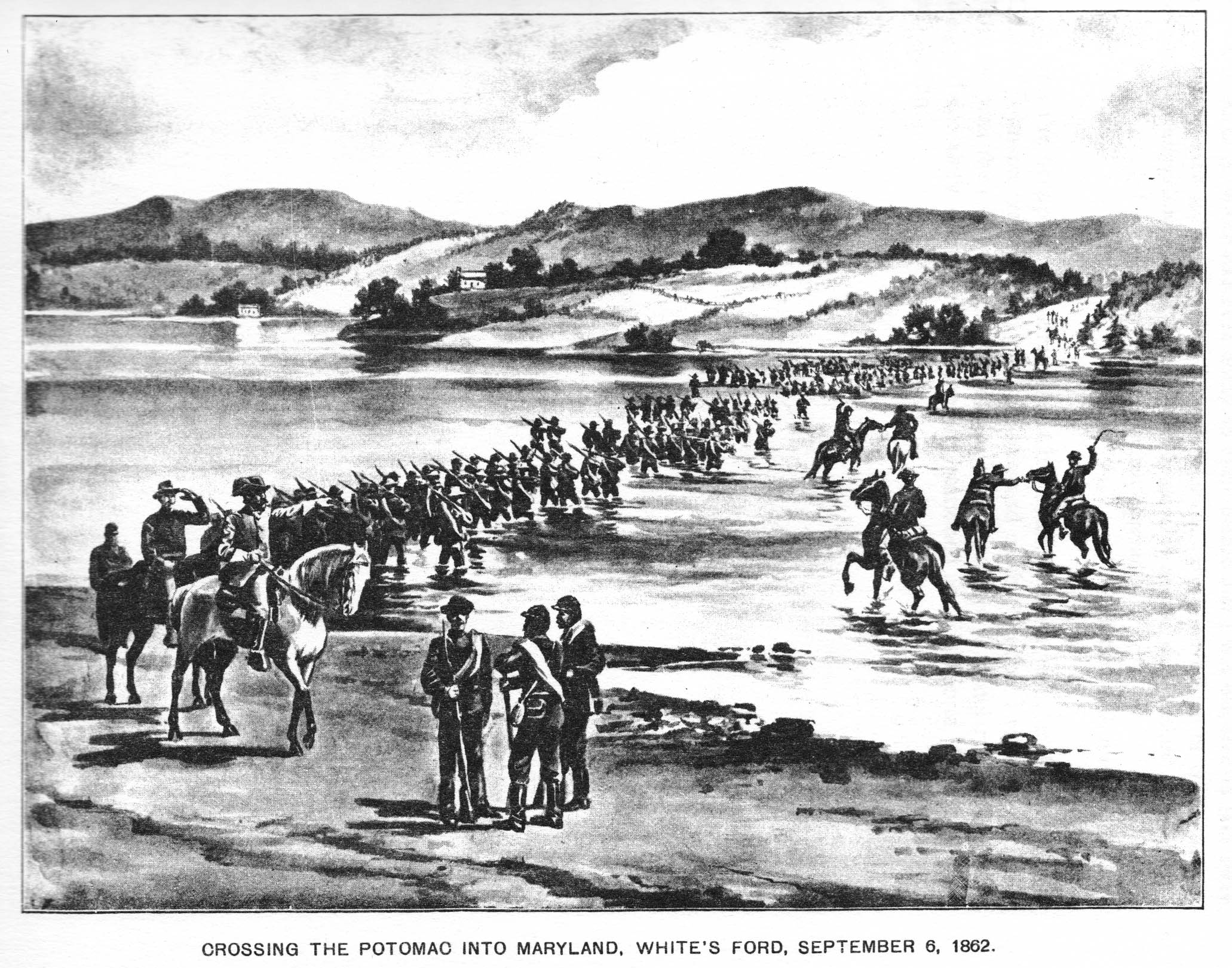
Crossing the Potomac into Maryland on 6th September 1862

Because Maryland's sympathies were divided, many Marylanders would fight one another during the conflict. On May 23, 1862, at the Battle of Front Royal, the 1st Maryland Infantry, CSA was thrown into battle with their fellow Marylanders, the Union 1st Maryland Infantry Regiment. This is the only time in United States military history that two regiments of the same numerical designation and from the same state have engaged each other in battle. After hours of desperate fighting the Southerners emerged victorious, despite an inferiority both of numbers and equipment. When the prisoners were taken, many men recognized former friends and family. Major William Goldsborough, whose memoir The Maryland Line in the Confederate Army chronicled the story of the rebel Marylanders, wrote of the battle:

nearly all recognized old friends and acquaintances, whom they greeted cordially, and divided with them the rations which had just changed hands.

Among the prisoners captured by William Goldsborough was his own brother Charles Goldsborough.

On 6 September 1862 advancing Confederate soldiers entered Frederick, Maryland, the home of Colonel Bradley T. Johnson, who issued a proclamation calling upon his fellow Marylanders to join his colors. Disappointingly for the exiles, recruits did not flock to the Confederate banner. Whether this was due to local sympathy with the Union cause or the generally ragged state of the Confederate army, many of whom had no shoes, is not clear. Frederick would later be extorted by Jubal Early, who threatened to burn down the city if its residents did not pay a ransom. Hagerstown too would also suffer a similar fate.

=== "Bloody Antietam" ===
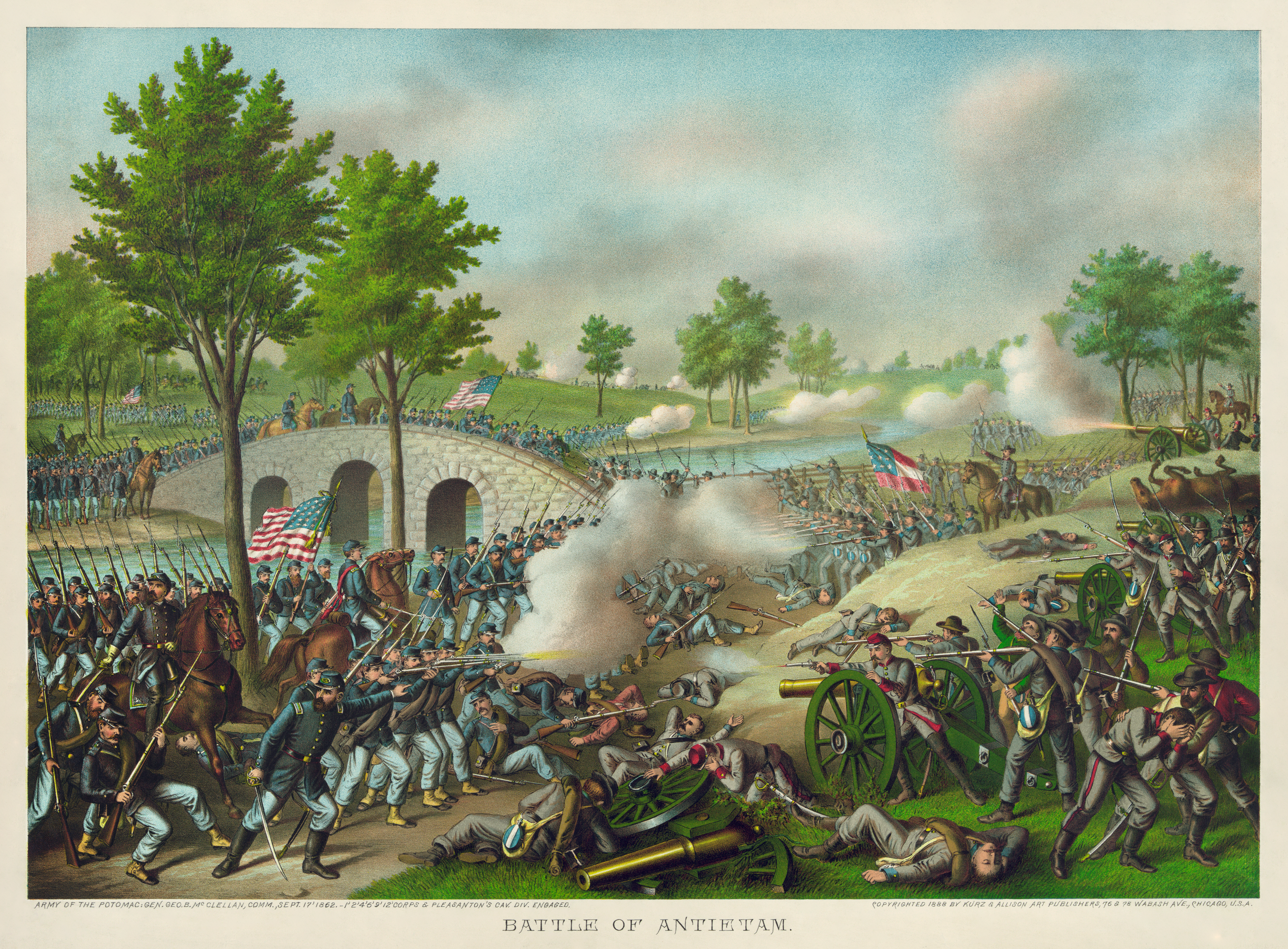
Battle of Antietam by Kurz and Allison.

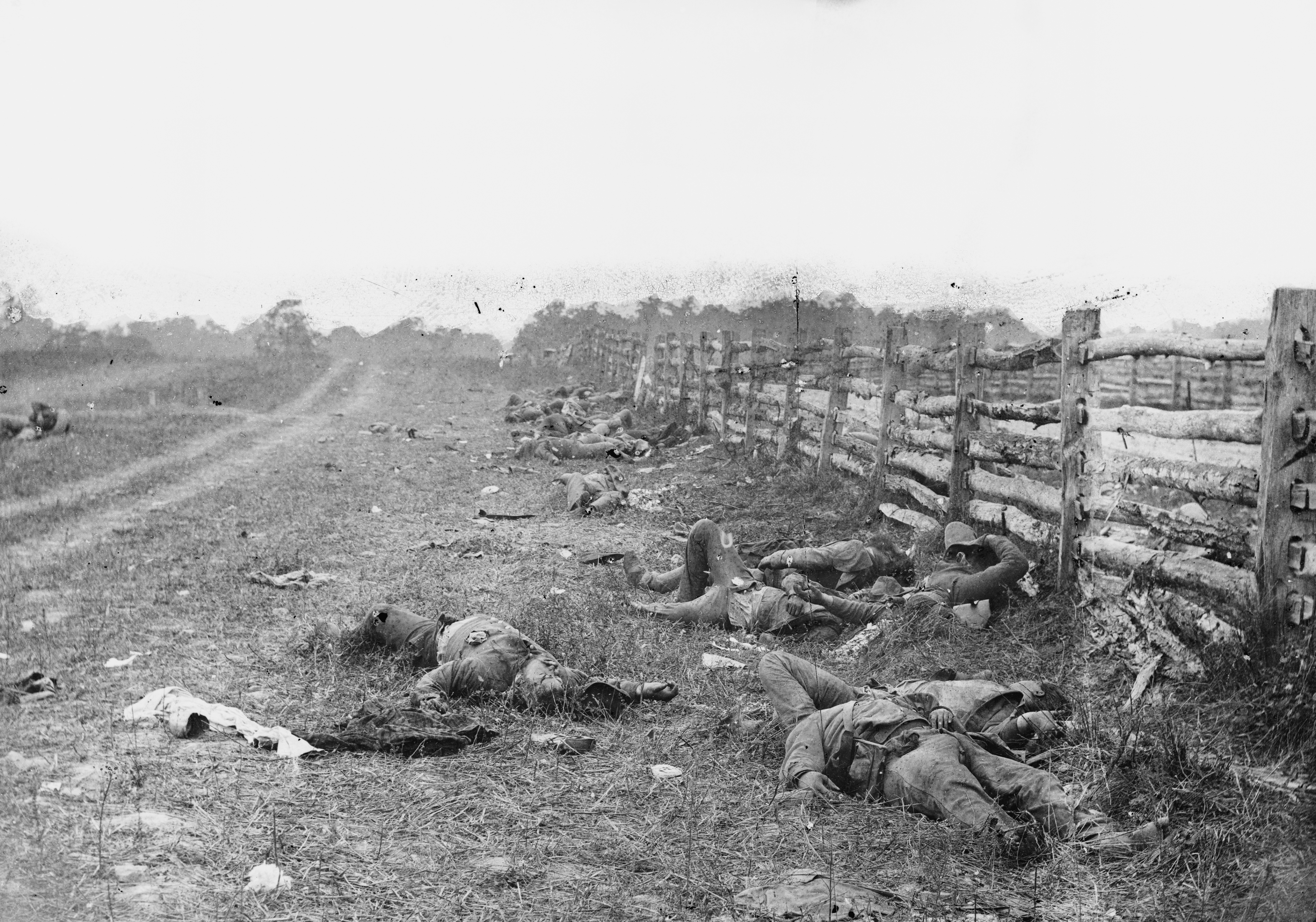
Confederate dead at Antietam.

One of the bloodiest battles fought in the Civil war (and one of the most significant) was the Battle of Antietam, fought on September 17, 1862, near Sharpsburg, Maryland, in which Marylanders fought with distinction for both armies. The battle was the culmination of Robert E. Lee's Maryland Campaign, which aimed to take the war to the North. Lee's Army of Northern Virginia, consisting of about 40,000 men, had entered Maryland following their recent victory at Second Bull Run.

While Major General George B. McClellan's 87,000-man Army of the Potomac was moving to intercept Lee, a Union soldier discovered a mislaid copy of the detailed battle plans of Lee's army, on Sunday 14 September. The order indicated that Lee had divided his army and dispersed portions geographically (to Harpers Ferry, West Virginia, and Hagerstown, Maryland), thus making each subject to isolation and defeat in detail – if McClellan could move quickly enough. However, McClellan waited about 18 hours before deciding to take advantage of this intelligence and position his forces based on it, thus endangering a golden opportunity to defeat Lee decisively.

The armies met near the town of Sharpsburg by the Antietam Creek. Losses were extremely heavy on both sides; The Union suffered 12,401 casualties with 2,108 dead. Confederate casualties were 10,318 with 1,546 dead. This represented 25% of the Federal force and 31% of the Confederate. More Americans died in battle on September 17, 1862, than on any other day in the nation's military history. The Confederate General A. P. Hill described

the most terrible slaughter that this war has yet witnessed. The broad surface of the Potomac was blue with floating bodies of our foe. But few escaped to tell the tale.

Although tactically inconclusive, the Battle of Antietam is considered a strategic Union victory and an important turning point of the war, because it forced the end of Lee's invasion of the North, and it allowed President Lincoln to issue the Emancipation Proclamation, taking effect on January 1, 1863. Lincoln had wished to issue his proclamation earlier, but needed a military victory in order for his proclamation not to become self-defeating. As Lincoln himself stated, five days before the battle:

What good would a proclamation from me do.... I don't want to issue a document the whole world will see must be inoperative, like the Pope's Bull against a comet.

Lee's setback at the Battle of Antietam can also be seen as a turning point in that it may have dissuaded the governments of France and Great Britain from recognizing the Confederacy, doubting the South's ability to maintain and win the war.

=== March to Gettysburg ===
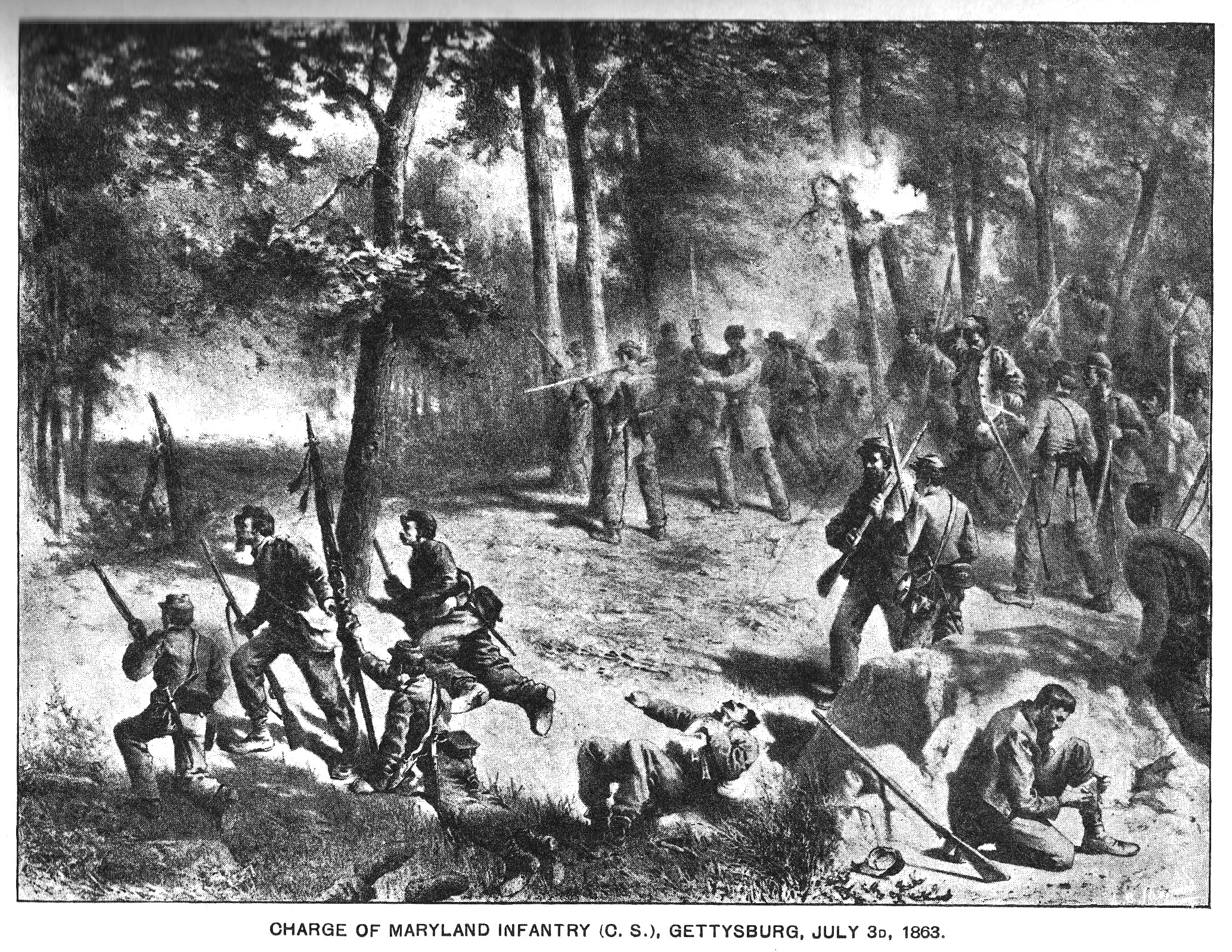
The Confederate 2nd Maryland infantry charge Union lines at Gettysburg

In June 1863 General Lee's army again advanced north into Maryland, taking the war into Union territory for the second time. Maryland exile George H. Steuart, leading the 2nd Maryland Infantry regiment, is said to have jumped down from his horse, kissed his native soil and stood on his head in jubilation. According to one of his aides: "We loved Maryland, we felt that she was in bondage against her will, and we burned with desire to have a part in liberating her". Quartermaster John Howard recalled that Steuart performed "seventeen double somersaults" all the while whistling Maryland, My Maryland. Such celebrations would prove short lived, as Steuart's brigade was soon to be severely damaged at the Battle of Gettysburg (July 1–3, 1863), a turning point in the war and a reverse from which the Confederate army would never recover.

=== Battle of Monocacy ===
In 1864, elements of the warring armies again met in Maryland, although this time the scope and size of the battle was much smaller. The Battle of Monocacy was fought on July 9, just outside Frederick, as part of the Valley Campaigns of 1864. Confederate forces under Lt. Gen. Jubal A. Early defeated Union troops under Maj. Gen. Lew Wallace. The battle was part of Early's raid through the Shenandoah Valley and into Maryland, attempting to divert Union forces away from Gen. Robert E. Lee's army under siege at Petersburg, Virginia. However, Wallace delayed Early for nearly a full day, buying enough time for Ulysses S. Grant to send reinforcements from the Army of the Potomac to the Washington defenses.

== Prisoners of war ==
Thousands of Union troops were stationed in Charles County, and the Federal Government established a large, unsheltered prison camp at Point Lookout at Maryland's southern tip in St. Mary's County between the Potomac River and the Chesapeake Bay, where thousands of Confederates were kept, often in harsh conditions. Of the 50,000 Southern soldiers held in the army prison camp, who were housed in tents at the Point between 1863 and 1865, according to the Maryland Department of Natural Resources, (Maryland Park Service) nearly 4,000 died, although this death rate of 8 percent was less than half the death rate among soldiers who were still fighting in the field with their own armies. The harshness of conditions at Point Lookout, and in particular whether such conditions formed part of a deliberate policy of "vindictive directives" from Washington, is a matter of some debate.

The state capital Annapolis's western suburb of Parole became a camp where prisoners-of-war would await formal exchange in the early years of the war. Around 70,000 soldiers passed through Camp Parole until Lt. Gen. Ulysses S. Grant assumed command as General-in-Chief of the Union Army in 1864, and ended the system of prisoner exchanges.

== Slavery and emancipation ==
Those who voted for Maryland to remain in the Union did not explicitly seek for the emancipation of Maryland's many enslaved people, or indeed those of the Confederacy. In March 1862, the Maryland Assembly passed a series of resolutions, stating that:

This war is prosecuted by the Nation with but one object, that, namely, of a restoration of the Union just as it was when the rebellion broke out. The rebellious States are to be brought back to their places in the Union, without change or diminution of their constitutional rights.

In other words, the Assembly members could only agree to state that the war was being fought over the issue of secession. Because Maryland had not seceded from the United States the state was not included under the Emancipation Proclamation of January 1, 1863, which declared that all enslaved people within the Confederacy would henceforth be free. In 1864, before the end of the War, a constitutional convention outlawed slavery in Maryland.

=== Constitution of 1864, and the abolition of slavery ===
The issue of slavery was finally confronted by the constitution which the state adopted in 1864. The document, which replaced the Maryland Constitution of 1851, was largely advocated by Unionists who had secured control of the state, and was framed by a Convention which met at Annapolis in April 1864. Article 24 of the constitution at last outlawed the practice of slavery.

One feature of the new constitution was a highly restrictive oath of allegiance which was designed to reduce the influence of Southern sympathizers, and to prevent such individuals from holding public office of any kind. The new constitution emancipated the state's slaves (who had not been freed by President Lincoln's Emancipation Proclamation), disenfranchised southern sympathizers, and re-apportioned the General Assembly based upon white inhabitants. This last provision diminished the power of the small counties where the majority of the state's large former slave population lived.

The constitution was submitted to the people for ratification on October 13, 1864, and it was narrowly approved by a vote of 30,174 to 29,799 (50.3% to 49.7%) in a vote likely overshadowed by the heavy presence of Union troops in the state and the repression of Confederate sympathizers. Those voting at their usual polling places were opposed to the Constitution by 29,536 to 27,541. However, the constitution secured ratification once the votes of Union army soldiers from Maryland were included. The Marylanders serving in the Union Army were overwhelmingly in favor of the new Constitution, supporting ratification by a margin of 2,633 to 263.

The new constitution came into effect on November 1, 1864, making Maryland the first Union slave state to abolish slavery since the beginning of the war. While it emancipated the state's slaves, it did not mean equality for them, in part because the franchise continued to be restricted to white males. The abolition of slavery in Maryland preceded the Thirteenth Amendment to the United States Constitution outlawing slavery throughout the United States and did not come into effect until December 6, 1865. Maryland had ratified the Thirteenth Amendment on February 3, 1865, within three days of it being submitted to the states.

Emancipation did not immediately bring citizenship for former slaves. The Maryland legislature refused to ratify both the 14th Amendment, which conferred citizenship rights on former slaves, and the 15th Amendment, which gave the vote to African Americans.

The right to vote was eventually extended to non-white males in the Maryland Constitution of 1867, which remains in effect today. The Constitution of 1867 overturned the registry test oath embedded in the 1864 constitution.

== Assassination of President Lincoln ==
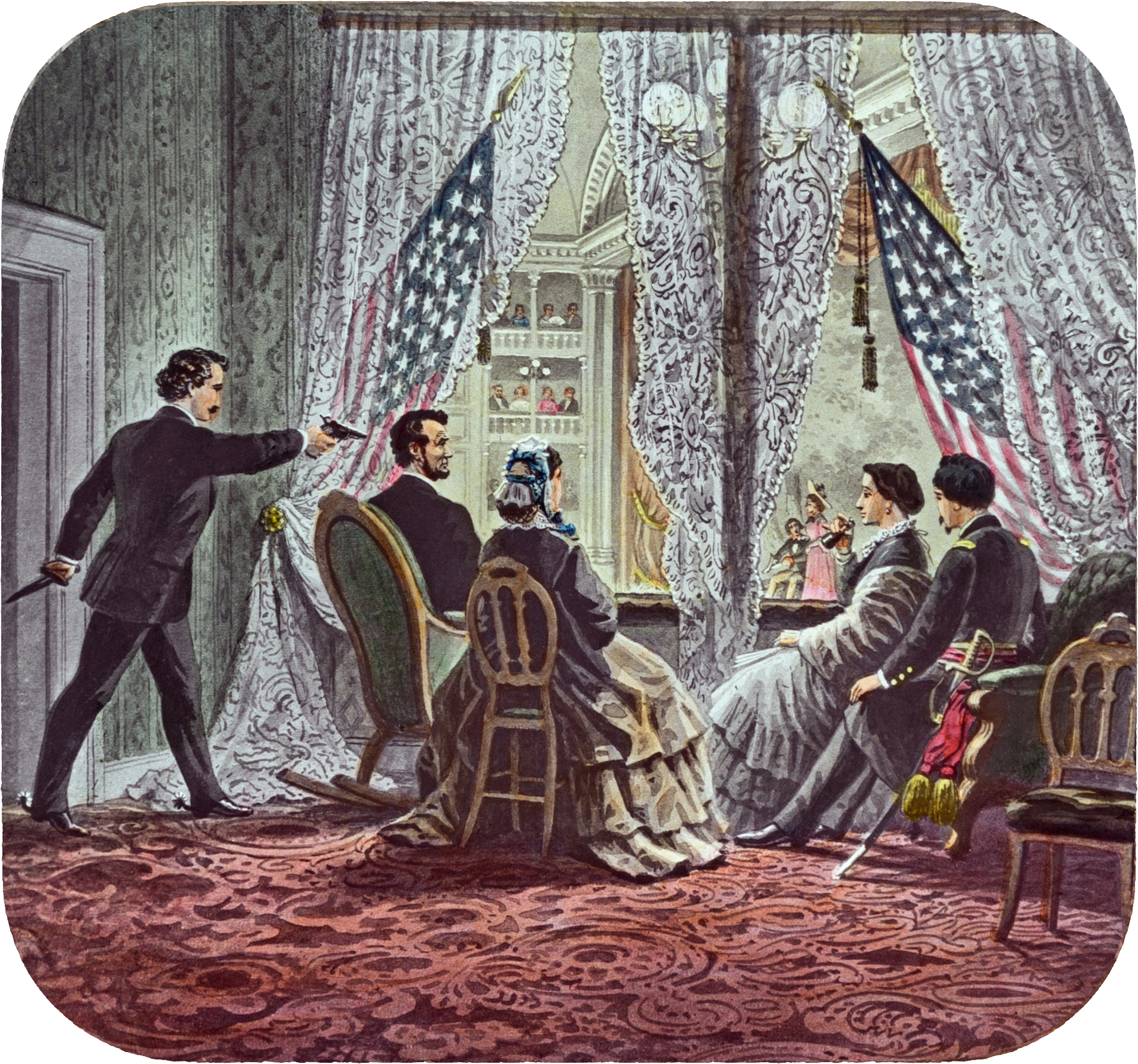
Marylander John Wilkes Booth assassinates President Lincoln

The issue of slavery may have been settled by the new constitution, and the legality of secession by the war, but this did not end the debate. On April 14, 1865, the actor John Wilkes Booth assassinated President Abraham Lincoln at Ford's Theatre in Washington, D.C. After he shot Lincoln, Booth shouted "Sic semper tyrannis" ("Thus always to tyrants"). Other witnesses – including Booth himself – claimed that he only yelled "Sic semper!" Some didn't recall hearing Booth shout anything in Latin. Some witnesses said he shouted "The South is avenged!" Others thought they heard him say "Revenge for the South!" or "The South shall be free!" Two said Booth yelled "I have done it!" After shooting the President, Booth galloped on his horse into Southern Maryland, where he was sheltered and helped by sympathetic residents and smuggled at night across the Potomac River into Virginia a week later.

In a letter explaining his actions, Booth wrote:

I have ever held the South was right. The very nomination of Abraham Lincoln, four years ago, spoke plainly war upon Southern rights and institutions... And looking upon African Slavery from the same stand-point held by the noble framers of our constitution, I for one, have ever considered it one of the greatest blessings (both for themselves and us,) that God has ever bestowed upon a favored nation… I have also studied hard to discover upon what grounds the right of a State to secede has been denied, when our very name, United States, and the Declaration of Independence, both provide for secession.

== Legacy ==
Most Marylanders fought for the Union, but after the war a number of memorials were erected in sympathy with the Lost Cause of the Confederacy, including in Baltimore a Confederate Women's Monument, and a Confederate Soldiers and Sailors Monument. Baltimore boasted a monument to Robert E. Lee and Stonewall Jackson until they were taken down on August 16, 2017, after the Unite the Right rally. A home for retired Confederate soldiers in Pikesville, Maryland opened in 1888 and did not close until 1932. A brochure published by the home in the 1890s described it as:

a haven of rest... to which they may retire and find refuge, and, at the same time, lose none of their self-respect, nor suffer in the estimation of those whose experience in life is more fortunate.

There formerly was a Confederate monument behind the courthouse in Rockville, Maryland, dedicated to "the thin grey line". Easton, Maryland also has a Confederate monument. Maryland has three chapters of the Sons of Confederate Veterans.

War produced a legacy of bitter resentment in politics, with the Democrats being identified with "treason and rebellion", a point much pressed home by their opponents. Democrats therefore re-branded themselves the "Democratic Conservative Party", and Republicans called themselves the "Union" party, in an attempt to distance themselves from their most radical elements during the war.

The legacies of the debate over Lincoln's heavy-handed actions that were meant to keep Maryland within the union include measures such as arresting one third of the Maryland General Assembly, which was controversially ruled unconstitutional at the time by Maryland native Justice Roger Taney, and in the lyrics of the former Maryland state song, Maryland, My Maryland, which referred to Lincoln as a "despot," a "vandal," and, a "tyrant."

== See also ==
- History of slavery in Maryland
- History of the Maryland Militia in the Civil War
- List of Maryland Union Civil War units
- List of Maryland Confederate Civil War units
- Maryland Line (CSA)
- Origins of the American Civil War
- Heart of the Civil War Heritage Area
