= John T. White =

John T. White (1856–1924) was a native of Frederick County, Maryland, known both for his extended service as a school administrator and superintendent and also for his work as a poet. His poem "Maryland, My Maryland," written in 1894 as an alternate set of lyrics for the Maryland state song has been considered by the Maryland General Assembly in the past to officially replace the existing lyrics by James Ryder Randall, which have been criticized for their Confederate sympathies and martial tone. All attempts to make White's work the official state song have failed, the most recent being in 2016.

== Personal life ==
The Frederick News-Post describes John T. White's life:

John T. White, born in 1856, was one of six children of a Middletown merchant, according to "Portrait and Biographical Record of the Sixth District," published in 1898. His father served for a time as the president of Frederick County's board of school commissioners.

After attending Middletown schools, White went to Mercersburg College. He graduated in 1878, then tutored Latin and Greek for a year, before moving to Mauch Chunk, Pa., where he was principal of both the grammar and high schools.

White moved to Cumberland in 1885. He was a school administrator and superintendent for more than 20 years, according to the text of House Bill 1241. He served as president of the Maryland State Teachers' Association and was "noted as one of the most successful educators in the State during the end of the 19th century," the bill states.

In 1879, White married Alice Eberly of Mercersburg, Pa. The Whites were members of St. Mark's Reformed Church and "popular in the best social circles of Cumberland," according to "Portrait and Biographical Record."

White was more than an educator, the book states: "As a poet, he is known throughout the state."

He wrote a verse titled "The Birth of Christ," which he had published as a gift book, as well as a poem on "Gettysburg."

He gave a lecture around the state, "Immortelles in Poetry," and advocated the memorization of songs and poems in schools.

In a speech before the Southern Educational Association in 1900, he encouraged his colleagues to "wander through the meadows of poetry inhaling the rich and precious perfume of her countless flowers whose divine essence will be forever breathed in the cloudless realm of eternity."

One visit by White to his birthplace was recorded in the July 21, 1882, Valley Register, which stated White and his wife spent their summer vacation with his mother and sister in Middletown shortly after his father's death. The story states that his return to "the old homestead, where it was his wont to meet and hold daily converse with this now departed parent, must have caused him many sad thoughts."

White died in 1924. He and his wife are buried near his parents in the Middletown cemetery.
