= Maryland, My Maryland =

Former state anthem of Maryland

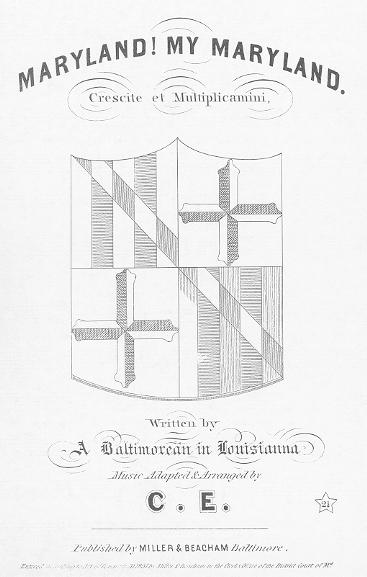
- The original sheet music of "Maryland, My Maryland"
- Regional anthem of Maryland
- Lyrics: James Ryder Randall, 1861; 165 years ago
- Music: Lauriger Horatius
- Adopted: April 29, 1939; 87 years ago
- Relinquished: May 18, 2021; 5 years ago
- Succeeded by: Vacant

Audio sample
- "Maryland, My Maryland" (instrumental): file; help

"Maryland, My Maryland" is the former state song of the U.S. state of Maryland from 1939 until 2021. The lyrics are from a nine-stanza poem written by James Ryder Randall in 1861 and sung to an old German folk melody, "Lauriger Horatius" — the same tune used for "O Tannenbaum". The state's general assembly adopted "Maryland, My Maryland" as the state song on April 29, 1939.

The song's words refer to Maryland's history and geography, specifically mentioning several historical figures of importance to the state. Written at the beginning of the Civil War, it was used across the Confederacy as a battle hymn. It has been called America's "most martial poem".

Because of its origin in reaction to the Baltimore riot of 1861 and Randall's support for the Confederate States, it includes lyrics that refer to President Abraham Lincoln as "the tyrant", "the despot", and "the Vandal", and to the Union as "Northern scum". It also mentions Virginia as an ally and includes that state's official motto "Sic semper tyrannis". The slogan was later shouted by Marylander John Wilkes Booth when he assassinated Lincoln. After more than ten attempts to change the state song, over 40 years, the state government elected to abandon "Maryland, My Maryland" as the state song without a replacement in 2021.

== History ==
The poem resulted from events at the beginning of the American Civil War. During the secession crisis, U.S. President Abraham Lincoln (referred to in the poem as "the despot" and "the tyrant") ordered U.S. troops to be brought to Washington, D.C. to protect the capital and to prepare for war with the seceding southern states. Many of these troops were brought through Baltimore, a major transportation hub. There was considerable Confederate sympathy in Maryland at the time; many residents opposing the use of the U.S. Army to prevent secession. Riots ensued as Union troops came through Baltimore on their way south in April 1861 and were attacked by mobs. Many Union troops and Baltimore residents were killed in the Baltimore riots. The Maryland legislature summarized the state's ambivalent feelings when it met soon after, on April 29, voting 53–13 against secession, but also voting not to reopen rail links with the North, and requesting that Lincoln remove the growing numbers of federal troops in Maryland. At this time the legislature seems to have wanted to avoid involvement in a war against its seceding neighbors. The contentious issue of troop transport through Maryland would lead one month later to the Chief Justice of the Supreme Court, also a Marylander, penning one of the United States' most controversial wartime rulings, Ex parte Merryman.

One of the reported victims of these troop transport riots was Francis X. Ward, a friend of James Ryder Randall. Randall, a native Marylander, was teaching at Poydras College in Pointe Coupee Parish, Louisiana, at the time and, moved by the news of his friend's death, wrote the nine-stanza poem "Maryland, My Maryland". The poem was a plea to his home state of Maryland to secede from the Union and join the Confederacy. Randall later claimed the poem was written "almost involuntarily" in the middle of the night on April 26, 1861. Being unable to sleep after hearing the news, he claimed that "some powerful spirit appeared to possess me... the whole poem was dashed off rapidly... [under] what may be called a conflagration of the senses, if not an inspiration of the intellect".

The poem contains many references to the Revolutionary War as well as to the Mexican–American War and Maryland figures in that war (many of whom have fallen into obscurity). It was first published in the New Orleans Sunday Delta. The poem was quickly turned into a song—put to the tune of "Lauriger Horatius"—by Baltimore resident Jennie Cary, sister of Hetty Cary. It became instantly popular in Maryland, aided by a series of unpopular federal actions there and throughout the South. It was sometimes called "the Marseillaise of the South". Confederate States Army bands played the song after they crossed into Maryland territory during the Maryland Campaign in 1862. By 1864, the Southern Punch noted that the song was "decidedly most popular" among the "claimants of a national song" for the Confederacy. According to some accounts, General Robert E. Lee ordered his troops to sing "Maryland, My Maryland" as they entered the town of Frederick, Maryland, but his troops received a cold response, as Frederick was located in the unionist western portion of the state. At least one Confederate regimental band also played the song as Lee's troops retreated across the Potomac after the bloody Battle of Antietam.

During the War, a version of the song was written with lyrics that supported the U.S. cause.

After the War, author Oliver Wendell Holmes Sr. compared "Maryland, My Maryland" with "John Brown's Body" as the two most popular songs from the opposing sides in the early months of the conflict. Each side, he wrote, had "a sword in its hand, each with a song in its mouth". The songs indicated as well their respective audiences, according to Holmes: "One is a hymn, with ghostly imagery and anthem-like ascription. The other is a lyric poem, appealing chiefly to local pride and passion."

== Lyrics ==
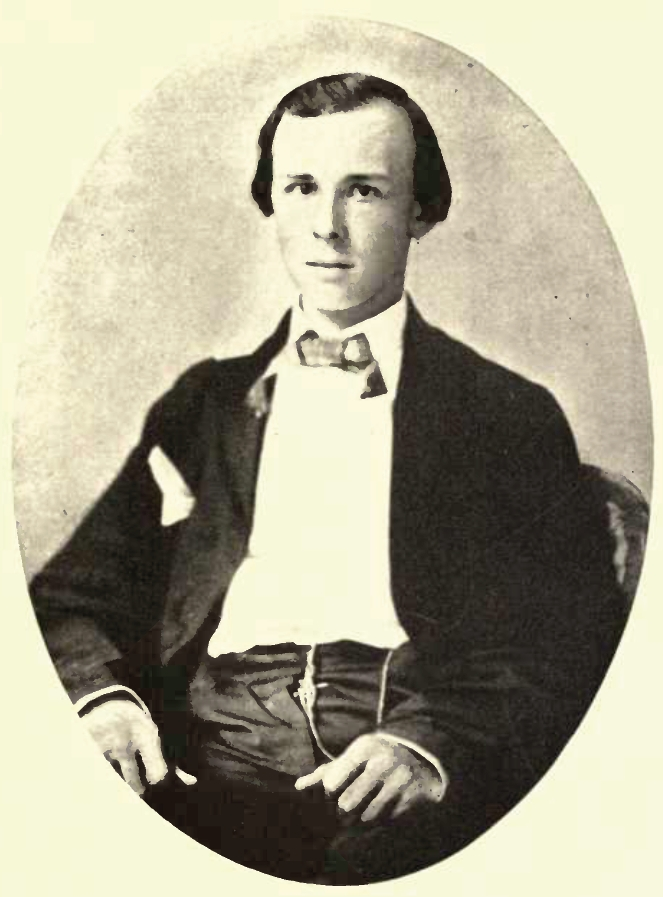
James Ryder Randall in 1861, the year he wrote "Maryland, My Maryland"

I
The despot's heel is on thy shore,
Maryland! (Note: Although the words as written, and as adopted by statute, contain only one instance of "Maryland" in the second and fourth line of each stanza, common practice is to sing "Maryland, my Maryland" each time to keep with the meter of the tune.)
His torch is at thy temple door,
Maryland!
Avenge the patriotic gore
That flecked the streets of Baltimore,
And be the battle queen of yore,
Maryland! My Maryland!

II
Hark to an exiled son's appeal,
Maryland!
My mother State! to thee I kneel,
Maryland!
For life and death, for woe and weal,
Thy peerless chivalry reveal,
And gird thy beauteous limbs with steel,
Maryland! My Maryland!

III
Thou wilt not cower in the dust,
Maryland!
Thy beaming sword shall never rust,
Maryland!
Remember Carroll's sacred trust,
Remember Howard's warlike thrust,—
And all thy slumberers with the just,
Maryland! My Maryland!

IV
Come! 'tis the red dawn of the day,
Maryland!
Come with thy panoplied array,
Maryland!
With Ringgold's spirit for the fray,
With Watson's blood at Monterey,
With fearless Lowe and dashing May,
Maryland! My Maryland!

V
Come! for thy shield is bright and strong,
Maryland!
Come! for thy dalliance does thee wrong,
Maryland!
Come to thine own anointed throng,
Stalking with Liberty along,
And sing thy dauntless slogan song,
Maryland! My Maryland!

VI
Dear Mother! burst the tyrant's chain,
Maryland!
Virginia should not call in vain,
Maryland!
She meets her sisters on the plain—
Sic semper! 'tis the proud refrain
That baffles minions back amain,
Maryland! My Maryland!

VII
I see the blush upon thy cheek,
Maryland!
For thou wast ever bravely meek,
Maryland!
But lo! there surges forth a shriek,
From hill to hill, from creek to creek—
Potomac calls to Chesapeake,
Maryland! My Maryland!

VIII
Thou wilt not yield the Vandal toll,
Maryland!
Thou wilt not crook to his control,
Maryland!
Better the fire upon thee roll,
Better the blade, the shot, the bowl,
Than crucifixion of the soul,
Maryland! My Maryland!

IX
I hear the distant thunder-hum,
Maryland!
The Old Line's bugle, fife, and drum,
Maryland!
She is not dead, nor deaf, nor dumb—
Huzza! she spurns the Northern scum!
She breathes! she burns! she'll come! she'll come!
Maryland! My Maryland!

== Union versions ==
Like many other songs from the American Civil War, there were multiple variations of this song that were written for both the Union and Confederacy. One version was written by American songwriter Septimus Winner in 1862, and went like this:

I
The Rebel horde is on thy shore,
Maryland my Maryland!
Arise and drive them from thy door,
Maryland my Maryland!
Avenge the foe thou must abhor,
Who seeks thy fall, oh Baltimore,
Drive back the tyrant, peace restore,
Maryland! My Maryland!

II
Hark to a nation's warm appeal,
Maryland my Maryland!
And sister states that for thee feel,
Maryland my Maryland!
Gird now thy sons, with arms of steel,
And heavy be the blows they deal,
For traitors shall thy vengeance feel,
Maryland! My Maryland!

III
Thou wilt not cower in the dust,
Maryland my Maryland!
Thy beaming sword shall never rust,
Maryland my Maryland!
Thy sons shall battle with the just,
And soon repel the traitor's thrust,
For in their strength our state shall trust,
Maryland! My Maryland!

IV
Come! For thy men are bold and strong,
Maryland my Maryland!
Drive back the foe that would thee wrong,
Maryland my Maryland!
Come with thine own heroic throng,
And as thy army moves along,
Let Union be their constant song,
Maryland! My Maryland!

V
Virginia feels the tyrant's chain,
Maryland my Maryland!
Her children lie around her slain,
Maryland my Maryland!
Let Carolina call in vain,
Our rights we know and will maintain,
Our rise shall be her fall again,
Maryland! My Maryland!

VI
I hear the distant battle's hum,
Maryland my Maryland!
I hear the bugle, fife and drum,
Maryland my Maryland!
Thou art not deaf, thou art not dumb,
Thou wilt not falter nor succumb,
I hear thee cry we come, we come,
Maryland! My Maryland!

VII
Ten hundred thousand, brave and free,
Maryland my Maryland!
Are ready now to strike with thee,
Maryland my Maryland!
A Million more still yet agree,
To help thee hold thy liberty,
For thou shalt ever be,
Maryland! Our Maryland!

== Efforts to repeal, replace, or revise Maryland's state song ==
Unsuccessful efforts to revise the lyrics to the song or to repeal or replace the song were attempted by members of the Maryland General Assembly in 1974, 1980, 1984, 2001, 2002, 2009, 2016, 2018, and 2019.

In July 2015, Delegate Peter A. Hammen, chairman of the Maryland House of Delegates House Health and Government Operations Committee, asked the Maryland State Archives to form an advisory panel to review the song. The panel issued a report in December 2015 that suggested that it was time the song was retired. The panel offered several options for revising the song's lyrics or replacing it with another song altogether.

The panel report stated that the Maryland state song should:

- celebrate Maryland and its citizens;
- be unique to Maryland;
- be historically significant;
- be inclusive of all Marylanders;
- be memorable, popular, singable and short (one, or at the most, two stanzas long).

In 2016, the Maryland Senate passed a bill to revise the song to include just the third verse of Randall's lyrics and only the fourth verse of a poem of the same name, written in 1894 by John T. White. This revision had the support of Maryland Senate President Thomas V. "Mike" Miller, who had resisted any changes to "Maryland, My Maryland" in the past. It was not reported out of the Health and Government Operations Committee in the House of Delegates, however.

On August 28, 2017, The Mighty Sound of Maryland, the marching band of the University of Maryland, suspended playing the song until they had time to review if it was aligned with the values of the school.

On March 16, 2018, the Maryland Senate passed an amended bill that would have changed the status of "Maryland! My Maryland!" from the "official State song" to the "Historical State song". The bill received an Unfavorable Report by the House Health and Government Operations Committee on April 9, 2018.

A bill was filed in the House of Delegates for the 2020 session to appoint an advisory panel to "review public submissions and suggestions for a new State song", but the bill did not advance past the hearing because the General Assembly adjourned early because of the COVID-19 pandemic.

On March 29, 2021, the Maryland legislature passed a bill to remove "Maryland, My Maryland" as the state song (with no replacement). Governor Larry Hogan signed the bill into law on May 18, 2021.

== Other uses of the melody ==
The songs "Michigan, My Michigan", "Florida, My Florida", and "The Song of Iowa" are set to the same tune as "Maryland, My Maryland". The College of the Holy Cross and St. Bonaventure University both use the tune for their respective alma maters.

The socialist song "The Red Flag" has historically been sung to the same tune.

In the film version of Gone with the Wind, "Maryland, My Maryland" is played at the opening scene of the Charity Ball when Scarlett and Melanie are reacquainted with Rhett Butler. Kid Ory's Creole Jazz Band recorded an instrumental version of "Maryland, My Maryland" on September 8, 1945, in the New Orleans jazz revival. Bing Crosby included the song in a medley on his album 101 Gang Songs (1961). In 1962, Edmund Wilson used the phrase "patriotic gore" from the song as the title of his book on the literature of the Civil War.

The third verse of "Maryland, My Maryland" was sung annually at the Preakness Stakes by the United States Naval Academy glee club; that practice was discontinued in 2020.

== See also ==
- Maryland in the American Civil War
- List of U.S. state songs
