= 1861 Baltimore riot =

Civil riot against Union troops early in the American Civil War

Coordinates: 39.2864°N 76.6148°W

Baltimore riot of 1861
- Part of the American Civil War
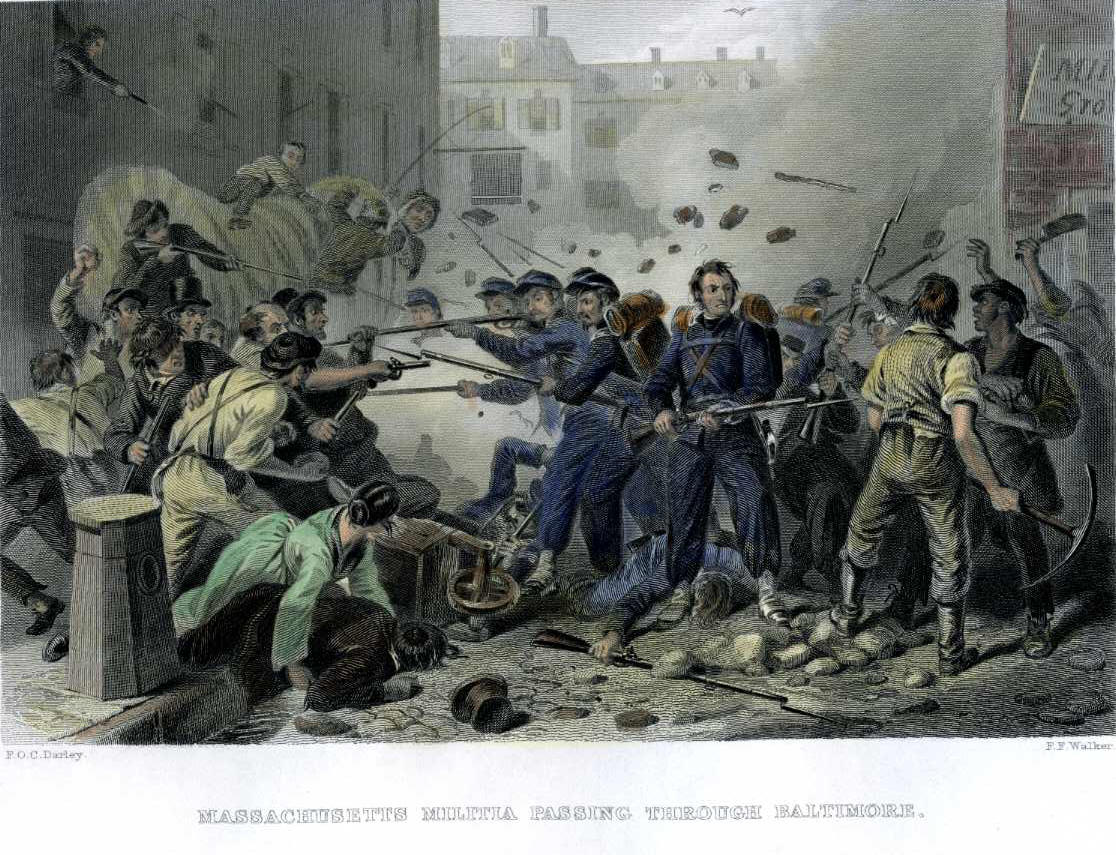
- "Massachusetts Militia Passing Through Baltimore", an 1861 engraving of the Baltimore Civil War riots
| Date | April 19, 1861 |
| Location | Baltimore, Maryland, U.S. |
| Result | Maryland pro-Confederate/Southern sympathizers ultimately suppressed pro-Union, state militia troops' advance into Washington, D.C. |

Belligerents
| United States (Union): 6th Massachusetts Militia; Washington Brigade of Philadelphia – Pennsylvania state militia; Baltimore City Police Department | Pro-Southern/Confederate Maryland sympathizers Maryland Copperhead Democrats: National volunteers (unorganized recruited soldiers/Southern sympathizers) |

Commanders and leaders
| (Massachusetts) Col. Edward F. Jones | None |

Casualties and losses
| 5 (soldiers) killed, 36 wounded | 12 (civilians) killed, unknown hundreds wounded |

The Baltimore riot of 1861 (also called the "Pratt Street Riots" and the "Pratt Street Massacre") was a civil conflict on Friday, April 19, 1861, on Pratt Street, Baltimore, Maryland. It occurred between antiwar "Copperhead" Democrats and other Confederate sympathizers on one side, and on the other, members of Massachusetts and Pennsylvania state militia regiments en route to the national capital at Washington who had been called up for federal service. The fighting began at the President Street Station, spreading throughout President Street and subsequently to Howard Street, where it ended at the Camden Street Station. The riot produced the first deaths of Union volunteers by hostile action, although caused by civilians, in the American Civil War. Civilians among the attackers also were killed.

== Background ==
In 1861, many Baltimoreans did not support a violent conflict with their southern neighbors, and some of them strongly sympathized with the Southern cause. Baltimore as it existed in 1861 was described by historian David J. Eicher as a "largely pro-Southern city". In the previous year's presidential election, Abraham Lincoln had received only 1,100 of more than 30,000 votes cast in the city. Lincoln's opponents were infuriated (and supporters disappointed) when the president-elect, fearing an infamous rumored assassination plot, traveled secretly through the city in the middle of the night on a different railroad protected by a few aides and detectives including the soon-to-be famous Allan Pinkerton in February en route to his inauguration (then constitutionally scheduled for March 4) in Washington, D.C. The city was also home to the country's largest population (25,000) of free African Americans, as well as many white abolitionists and supporters of the Union. As the war began, the city's divided loyalties created tension. Supporters of secession and slavery organized themselves into a force called "National Volunteers" while Unionists and abolitionists called themselves "Minute Men".

The Battle of Fort Sumter had occurred on April 12–13, one week before the riot. At the time, Virginia, North Carolina, Tennessee, and Arkansas had not yet seceded from the U.S. In fact, before Lincoln's demand for 75,000 soldiers with which to put down the rebellion, Virginia, North Carolina, and Arkansas had elected secession delegations which had voted to remain in the Union and Tennessee had held a referendum of the people to determine whether to elect a secession delegation, and had voted by about 2/3 majority to not even consider the matter. The other slave states of Delaware and Maryland, as well as Missouri and Kentucky (later known as "border states") were in flux. When Fort Sumter fell on April 13, President Lincoln sent telegrams followed by letters to all the governors of states that had not seceded, calling for 75,000 troops with which to repossess U.S. property in the South. After receiving this communication, the Governor of Virginia directed Virginia's Secession Delegation to reconvene. Just nine days earlier, on April 4, 1861, Virginia's secession delegation had voted to stand with the Union by a vote of 90 to 45. However, in light of the call for troops, Virginia's Secession Delegation did meet once more and took another vote. On April 17, the new vote was 85 to 55 that Virginia would secede, with the condition that a referendum of the people would be held and secession would occur only if the people confirmed the vote of the Delegation.

Virginia's secession was particularly significant due to the state's industrial capacity. Sympathetic Marylanders who had supported secession ever since John C. Calhoun spoke of nullification, agitated to join Virginia in leaving the Union. Their discontent increased in the days afterward when Lincoln put out a call for militiamen to serve 90 days and end the insurrection.

New militia units from several Northern states were starting to move south, particularly to protect Washington, D.C., from the new Confederate threat in Virginia, which bordered the capital. Baltimore's newly elected reform mayor, George William Brown, and the new police marshal (chief), George Proctor Kane, anticipated trouble and began efforts to placate the city's population.

On Thursday, April 18, 460 newly mustered Pennsylvania state militia volunteers (generally from the Pottsville, Pennsylvania, area) arrived from the state capital at Harrisburg on the Northern Central Railway at its Bolton Street Station (off present-day North Howard Street — across the street from the present site of the Fifth Regiment Armory of the Maryland National Guard, built 1900). They were joined by several regiments of regular United States Army troops under John C. Pemberton (later the Confederate general and commander at the siege of Vicksburg, Mississippi, whose surrender in July 1863 resulted in the first split of the Confederacy) returning from duty on the western frontier. They split off from Howard Street in downtown Baltimore and marched east along the waterfront to Fort McHenry and reported for duty there. Seven hundred "National Volunteers" of Southern sympathizers rallied at the Washington Monument and traveled to the station to confront the combined units of troops, which unbeknownst to them were unarmed and had their weapons unloaded. Kane's newly organized city police force generally succeeded in ensuring the safe passage of Pennsylvania militia troops' marching south on Howard Street to Camden Street Station of the Baltimore and Ohio Railroad. Nevertheless, stones and bricks were hurled (along with many insults) and Nicholas Biddle, a black servant traveling with the regiment, was hit on the head. But that night the Pennsylvania troops, later known as the "First Defenders", camped at the U.S. Capitol under the incomplete dome, which was then under construction.

== Incident ==
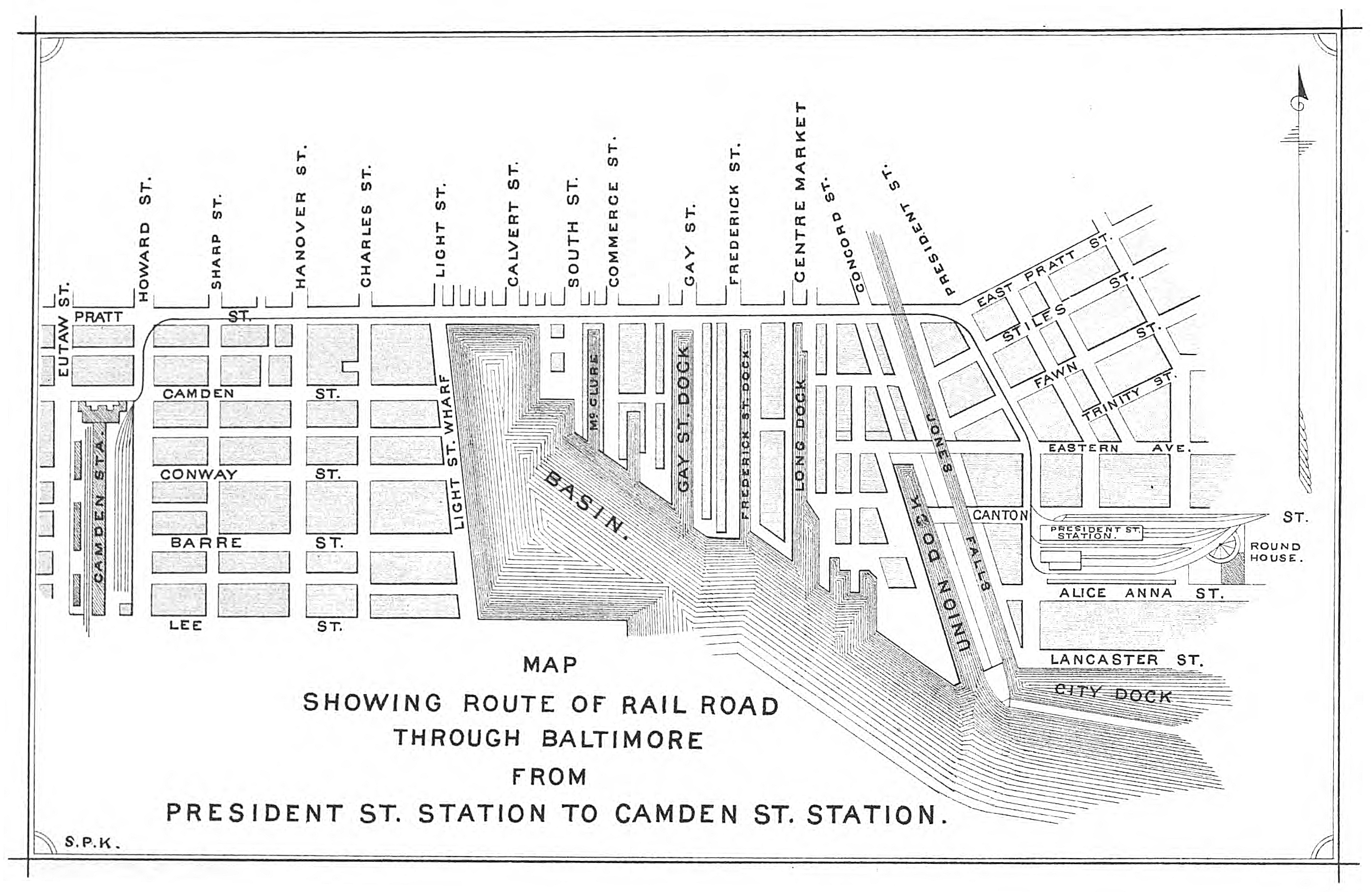
Union route through Baltimore, as later depicted by Mayor George Brown

On April 17, the 6th Massachusetts Militia departed from Boston, arriving in New York City the following morning and Philadelphia by nightfall. On April 19, the unit headed on to Baltimore, where they anticipated a slow transit through the city. Because of an ordinance preventing the construction of steam rail lines through the city, there was no direct rail connection between the Philadelphia, Wilmington and Baltimore Railroad's President Street Station and the Baltimore and Ohio Railroad's Camden Station (ten blocks to the west). Rail cars that transferred between the two stations had to be pulled by horses along Pratt Street. Sometime after leaving Philadelphia, the unit's colonel, Edward F. Jones, received information that passage through Baltimore "would be resisted". According to his later report, Jones went through the railroad cars and gave this order:

The regiment will march through Baltimore in column of sections, arms at will. You will undoubtedly be insulted, abused, and, perhaps, assaulted, to which you must pay no attention whatever, but march with your faces to the front, and pay no attention to the mob, even if they throw stones, bricks, or other missiles; but if you are fired upon and any one of you is hit, your officers will order you to fire. Do not fire into any promiscuous crowds, but select, any man whom you may see aiming at you, and be sure you drop him.

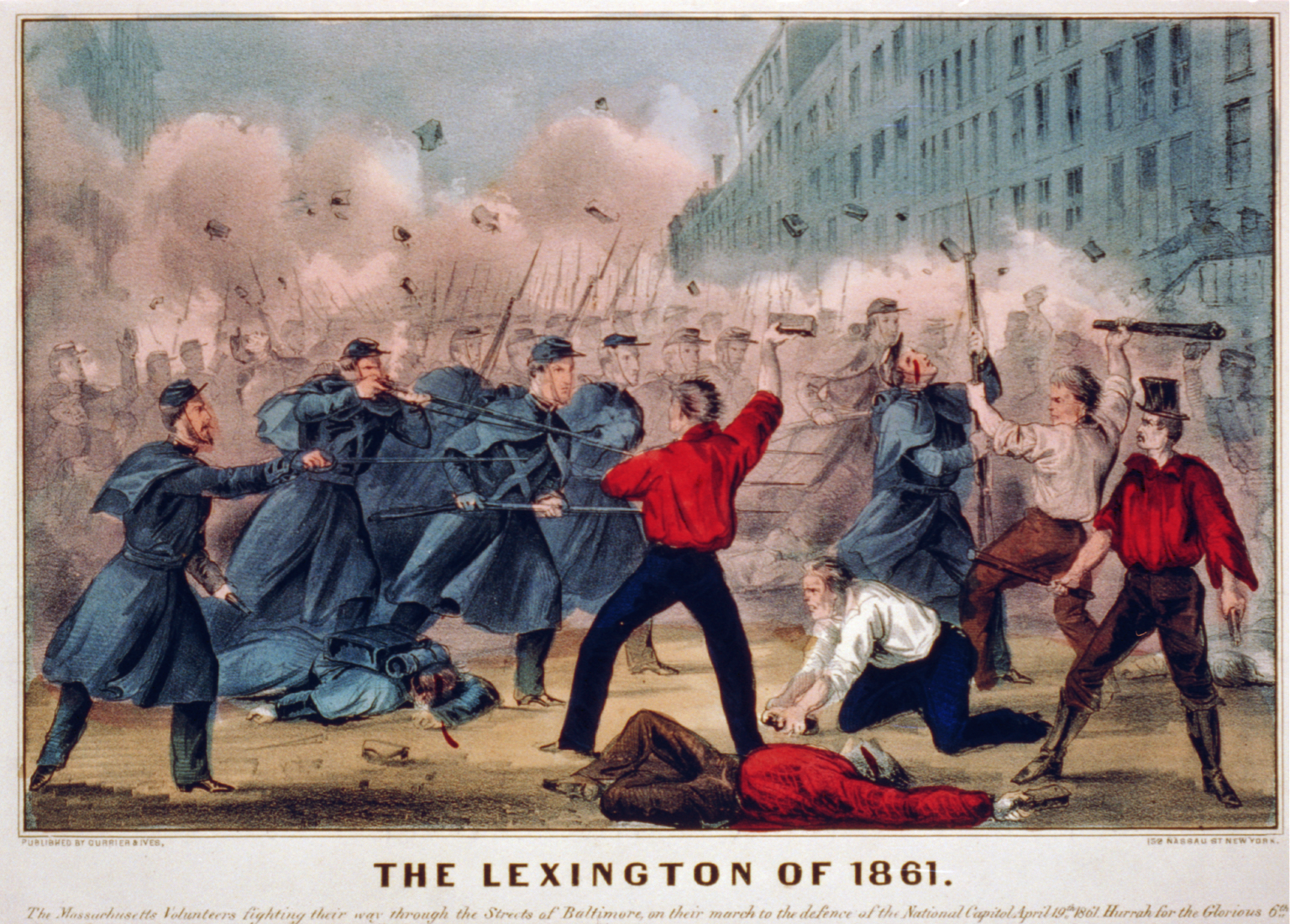
Currier & Ives lithograph The Lexington of 1861

Indeed, as the militia regiment transferred between stations, a mob of anti-war supporters and Southern sympathizers attacked the train cars and blocked the route. When it became apparent that they could not travel by horse-drawn railroad cars over the connecting track between the stations, the four companies, about 240 soldiers, got out of the cars and marched in formation through the city. However, the mob followed the soldiers, causing damage and placing obstructions until they finally blocked the soldiers. The mob attacked the rear companies of the regiment with "bricks, paving stones, and pistols." In response, several soldiers fired into the mob, beginning a giant brawl between the soldiers, the mob, and the Baltimore police. In the end, the soldiers got to the Camden Station, and the police were able to block the crowd from them. The regiment had left behind much of their equipment, including their marching band's instruments.

Five soldiers (Corporal Sumner Henry Needham of Company I and privates Luther C. Ladd, Charles Taylor, Addison Whitney and Sergeant John Ames of Company D) were killed or mortally wounded in the riot. About 36 men of the regiment were also wounded; many were left behind. At least 12 civilians were also killed. It is unknown how many more civilians were injured. Luther C. Ladd is often called the first Union soldier killed in action during the American Civil War.

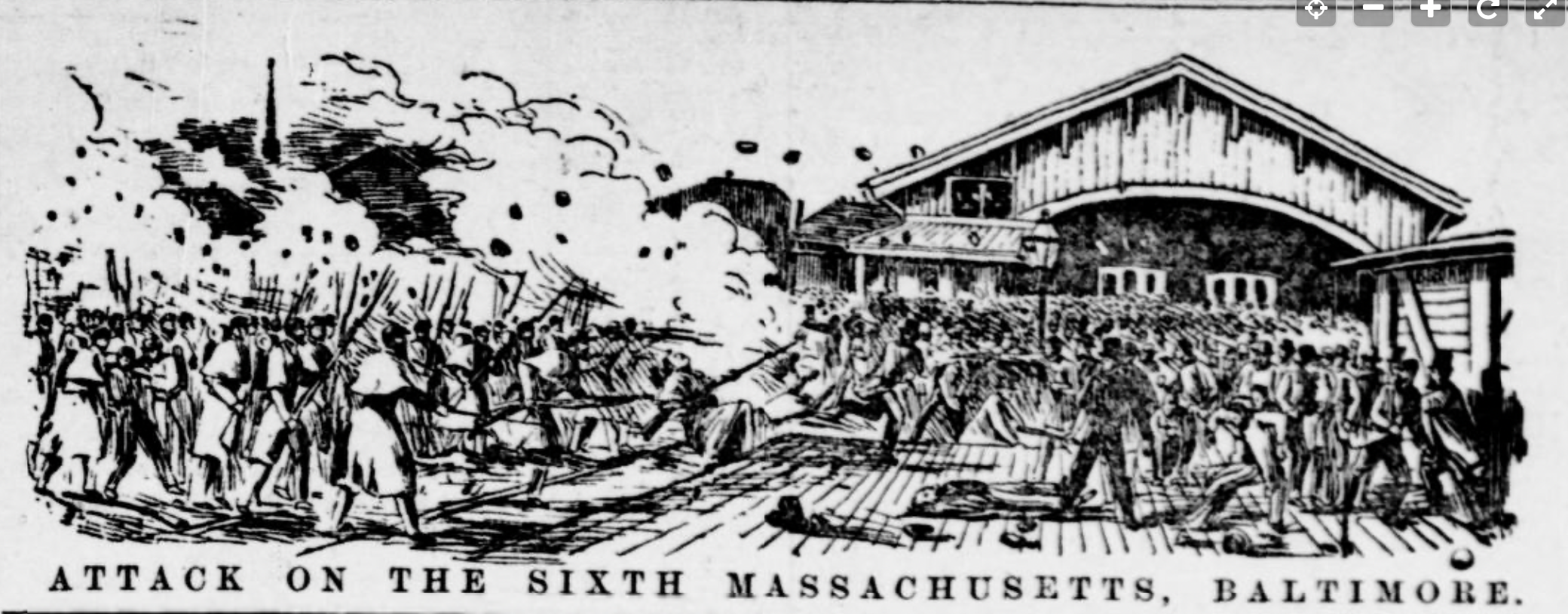
Illustration of the riot from 1892

The same day, after the attack on the soldiers, the office of the Baltimore Wecker, a German-language newspaper, was completely wrecked and the building seriously damaged by the same mob. The Wecker's founder, Carl Heinrich Schnauffer, as well as its prominent employees had fled Germany after the failed revolution of 1848–49. The publisher, William Schnauffer, and the editor, Wilhelm Rapp, whose lives were threatened, were compelled to leave town. The publisher later returned and resumed publication of the Wecker which continued throughout the war to be a supporter of the Union cause. The editor moved to another paper in Illinois.

As a result of the riot in Baltimore and pro-Southern sympathies of some of the city's populace, the Baltimore Steam Packet Company also declined the same day a Federal government request to transport Union forces to relieve the beleaguered Union naval yard facility at Portsmouth, Virginia.

== Aftermath ==
In Brown's later assessment, it was the Baltimore riot that pushed the two sides over the edge into full-scale war, "because then was shed the first blood in a conflict between the North and the South; then a step was taken which made compromise or retreat almost impossible; then passions on both sides were aroused which could not be controlled".

On July 10, 1861, a grand jury of the United States District Court indicted Samuel Mactier, Lewis Bitter, James McCartney, Philip Casmire, Michael Hooper and Richard H. Mitchell for their part in the riot.

After the April 19 riot, some small skirmishes occurred throughout Baltimore between citizens and police for the next month, but a sense of normalcy returned as the city was cleaned up. Mayor Brown and Maryland Governor Hicks implored President Lincoln to send no further troops through Maryland to avoid further confrontations. However, as Lincoln remarked to a peace delegation from the YMCA, Union soldiers were "neither birds to fly over Maryland, nor moles to burrow under it". On the evening of April 20 Hicks also authorized Brown to dispatch the Maryland state militia for the purpose of disabling the railroad bridges into the city—an act he would later deny. One of the militia leaders was John Merryman, who was arrested one month later, and held in defiance of a writ of habeas corpus, which led to the case of Ex parte Merryman.

The city's banks and wealthy individuals, such as Johns Hopkins, John Clark, and Colonel Columbus O'Donnell, convened quickly after recognizing the severity of the situation. In a meeting, the wealthy Union members who were supporters of the Union appropriated a sum of $500,000 to be expended under the mayor's directions. Hopkins, born in 1795, was a Quaker, businessman, and staunch supporter of the Union. His belief in equality and social reform was deeply rooted in his Quaker upbringing and the experiences of the Civil War. During the Civil War, Hopkins was an ardent supporter of the Union by providing financial support to Union soldiers and their families. He tried to relieve suffering in Baltimore during this period. The committee raised funds-"placing the whole sum at the disposal"-to aid the efforts of the city in maintaining order and defence. This shows how civic leaders marshalled resources for the public good during the crisis. In his book History of Maryland, Thomas Scharf records this as a good example of leadership and collaboration. He says that actions of these figures were supported by several local newspapers, including American Exchange, German Correspondent, and the Clipper.

On April 19, Major General Robert Patterson, commander of the Department of Washington (Pennsylvania, Delaware, Maryland, and the District of Columbia), ordered Brigadier General Benjamin Butler, with the 8th Massachusetts, to open and secure a route from Annapolis through Annapolis Junction to Washington. The 8th Massachusetts arrived by ship at Annapolis on April 20. Gov. Hicks and the Mayor of Annapolis protested, but Butler (a clever politician) bullied them into allowing troops to land at Annapolis, saying, "'I must land, for my troops are hungry.'—'No one in Annapolis will sell them anything,' replied these authorities of the State and city." Butler intimated that armed men were not always limited to the necessity of purchasing food when famished.

The 8th Massachusetts, with the 7th New York Infantry Regiment, proceeded to Annapolis Junction (halfway between Baltimore and Washington), and the 7th New York went on to Washington, where, on the afternoon of April 25, they became the first troops to reach the capital by this route.

There were calls for Maryland to declare secession in the wake of the riot. Governor Hicks called a special session of the state legislature to consider the situation. Since Annapolis, the capital, was occupied by Federal troops, and Baltimore was harboring many pro-Confederate mobs, Hicks directed the legislature to meet in Frederick, in the predominantly Unionist western part of the state. The legislature met on April 26; on April 29, it voted 53–13 against secession, though it also voted not to reopen rail links with the North, and requested that Lincoln remove the growing numbers of federal troops in Maryland. At this time the legislature seems to have wanted to maintain Maryland's neutrality in the conflict.

Many more Union troops arrived. On May 13, Butler sent Union troops into Baltimore and declared martial law. He was replaced as commander of the Department of Annapolis by George Cadwalader, another Brigadier General in the United States Volunteers. Lincoln subsequently had the mayor, police chief, entire Board of Police, and city council of Baltimore imprisoned without charges, as well as one sitting U.S. Congressman from Baltimore. Chief Justice Roger B. Taney, also a native of Maryland, ruled on June 4, 1861, in ex parte Merryman that Lincoln's suspension of habeas corpus was unconstitutional; but Lincoln ignored the ruling, and in September when Baltimore newspaper editor Frank Key Howard, Francis Scott Key's grandson, criticized this in an editorial he too was imprisoned without trial. Federal troops imprisoned the young newspaper editor in Fort McHenry, which, as he noted, was the same fort where the Star Spangled Banner had been waving "o'er the land of the free" in his grandfather's song. In 1863 Howard wrote about his experience as a political prisoner at Fort McHenry in the book Fourteen Months in the American Bastille; two of the publishers selling the book were then arrested.

A man supposed to be a Maryland State Militia soldier was detained in Fort McHenry, and Judge Giles, in Baltimore, issued a writ of habeas corpus, but Major W. W. Morris, commander of the fort, wrote back, "At the date of issuing your writ, and for two weeks previous, the city which you live, and where your court has been held, was entirely under the control of revolutionary authorities. Within that period United States soldiers, while committing no offense, had been perfidiously attacked and inhumanly murdered in your streets; no punishment had been awarded, and, I believe, no arrests had been made for these crimes; supplies of provisions intended for this garrison has been stopped; the intention to capture this fort had been boldly proclaimed; your most public thoroughfares were daily patrolled by large numbers of troops, armed and clothed, at least in part, with articles stolen from the United States; and the Federal flag, while waving over the Federal offices, was cut down by some person wearing the uniform of a Maryland soldier. To add the foregoing, an assembly elected in defiance of law, but claiming to be the legislative body of your State, and so recognized by the Executive of Maryland, was debating the Federal compact. If all this be not rebellion, I know not what to call it. I certainly regard it as sufficient legal cause for suspending the privilege of the writ of habeas corpus." Moreover, Morris wrote, "If, in an experience of thirty-three years, you have never before known the writ to be disobeyed, it is only because such a contingency in political affairs as the present has never before arisen."

Just before daybreak on June 27, soldiers marched from Fort McHenry on orders from Major General Nathaniel P. Banks, who had succeeded Cadwalader as commander of the Department of Annapolis, and arrested Marshal George P. Kane. Banks appointed Col. John Reese Kenly of the 1st Maryland Infantry Regiment as provost marshal to superintend the Baltimore police; Kenly enrolled, organized, and armed 250 Unionists for a new police. When the old Board of Police would not recognize the new police, and tried to continue the old police, they were arrested and sent to Fort Warren in Boston Harbor. On July 10, George R. Dodge, a civilian, was appointed as marshal of police.

Major General John Adams Dix succeeded Banks in command of the Department of Annapolis, and Colonel Abram Duryée's 5th New York Volunteer Infantry, "Duryée's Zouaves", constructed Fort Federal Hill, Baltimore. To better secure the city, a ring of additional fortifications were built in and around the city, most notably Fort Worthington to the northeast (around present-day Berea), and Fort Marshall (in present-day Highlandtown/Canton).

Some Southerners reacted with passion to the incident. James Ryder Randall, a teacher in Louisiana but a native Marylander who had lost a friend in the riots, wrote "Maryland, My Maryland" for the Southern cause in response to the riots. The poem was later set to "Lauriger Horatius" (the tune of O Tannenbaum), a melody popular in the South, and referred to the riots with lines such as "Avenge the patriotic gore / That flecked the streets of Baltimore". It did not become Maryland's state song until 78 years later (1939). After many efforts to revoke this status, it was removed from being the state song in 2021.

On September 17, 1861, the day the legislature reconvened to discuss these later events and Lincoln's possibly unconstitutional actions, twenty-seven state legislators (one-third of the Maryland General Assembly) were arrested and jailed by federal troops, using Lincoln's suspension of habeas corpus, and in further defiance of the U.S. Supreme Court Chief Justice's ex parte Merryman ruling. As a result, the legislative session was canceled. A new legislature was elected in November 1861.

== See also ==
- Baltimore Plot
- Baltimore railroad strike of 1877
- Baltimore Know-Nothing riots of 1856
- George H. Steuart (militia general)
- Henry Stump
- List of incidents of civil unrest in the United States
- New York City draft riots
- Edwin Bennett (businessman, conflict occurred in front of his house)

== Notes ==
=== Bibliography ===
- Detzer, David. Dissonance: The Turbulent Days Between Fort Sumter and Bull Run. New York: Harcourt, 2006. ISBN 978-0-15-603064-9.
- Harry Ezratty, Baltimore in the Civil War: The Pratt Street Riot and a City Occupied, Charleston, SC: The History Press, 2010. ISBN 978-1-60949-003-4.
- George William Brown, Baltimore And The Nineteenth Of April, 1861: A Study Of The War, Baltimore: N. Murray (Johns Hopkins University), 1887.
