= Sumner Henry Needham =

Union Army soldier

Sumner Henry Needham (born March 2, 1828 - died April 27, 1861) was identified in an 1888 book on the history of Essex County, Massachusetts as the first Union combat casualty of the American Civil War, although he was killed by civilians of the United States in the Baltimore riot of 1861 as the troops passed through that city. Needham was shot on April 19, 1861 but lingered for eight days before dying of his wounds.

Modern historian David Detzer states that Luther C. Ladd was the first Union soldier to die in the Baltimore riot. On June 1, 1861 in a report dated May 16, 1861, Harper's Weekly identified Ladd as the "first victim of the war" on April 19, 1861.
