= 6th Massachusetts Militia Regiment =

Peacetime infantry regiment

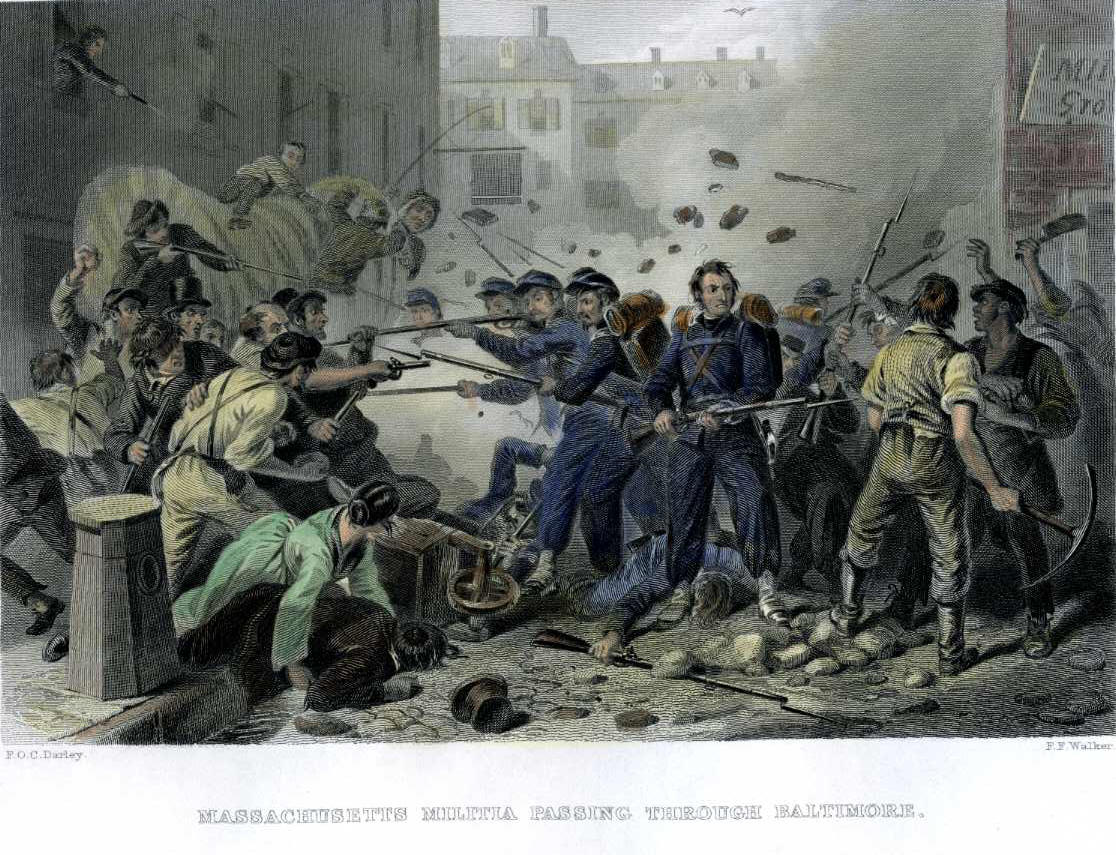
- During the Baltimore Riot, the 6th Massachusetts became the first Union unit to take casualties in action on April 19, 1861.
- Active: April–August 1861; August 1862 – June 1863; July–October 1864
- Country: United States
- Allegiance: Union
- Branch: Union Army
- Type: Infantry
- Part of: In 1863: 2nd Brigade (Foster's), 1st Division (Corcoran's), VII Corps
- Engagements: American Civil War; Baltimore riot of 1861

Commanders
- Notable commanders: Col. Edward F. Jones

Insignia
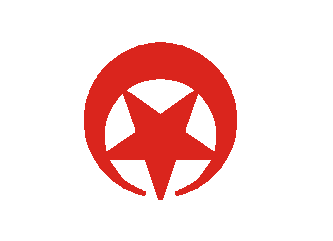
- VII Corps, 1st Division badge

The 6th Massachusetts Militia Regiment was a peacetime infantry regiment that was activated for federal service in the Union army for three separate terms during the American Civil War (1861-1865). The regiment gained notoriety as the first unit in the Union Army to suffer fatal casualties in action during the Civil War in the Baltimore Riot and the first militia unit to arrive in Washington D.C., in response to President Abraham Lincoln's initial call for 75,000 troops. Private Luther C. Ladd of the 6th Massachusetts is often referred to as the first Union soldier killed in action during the war.

In the years immediately preceding the war and during its first enlistment, the regiment consisted primarily of companies from Middlesex County. During its first term of service, four out of ten companies of the regiment were from Lowell, Massachusetts. Colonel Edward F. Jones commanded the regiment during its first term. He later commanded the 26th Massachusetts and was awarded the honorary grade of brevet brigadier general. During its second and third terms of service, the unit was commanded by Colonel Albert S. Follansbee.

The regiment first enlisted for a "90-day" term of service which lasted from April 16 to August 2, 1861. Following their engagement in the Baltimore Riot, the 6th Massachusetts proceeded to Washington and then returned to Baltimore to guard locations within the city as well as the Baltimore and Ohio Railroad station at Elkridge, Maryland. Their second term of service lasted nine months from August 1862 to June 1863. During this time the 6th Massachusetts was attached to the VII Corps and participated in several expeditions and actions in the vicinity of Suffolk, Virginia, most notably the siege of Suffolk and the Battle of Carrsville in April and May 1863. Private Joseph S.G. Sweatt's bravery at Carrsville earned him the Medal of Honor. The 6th Massachusetts served a third term in response to the call for troops to defend fortifications around Washington. During this term, which lasted 100 days from July to October 1864, the 6th Massachusetts garrisoned Fort C. F. Smith in Arlington, Virginia and guarded Confederate prisoners of war at Fort Delaware near the mouth of the Delaware River.

== Earlier units ==
The 6th Massachusetts regiment that served during the Civil War was formed in 1855 during the reorganization of the Massachusetts militia. Other units dating back to the 18th century were given the designation 6th Regiment Massachusetts Militia. They were formed and disbanded at various times and although they shared the same numerical designation, there was no continuous unit known as the 6th Massachusetts. One of the units designated as the 6th Massachusetts was a regiment that served during King George's War in the siege of Louisbourg in 1745. During the Revolutionary War, the 6th Massachusetts Regiment was engaged in the Battle of Bunker Hill, the Battle of Harlem Heights, the Battle of Trenton and the Battle of Saratoga.

== 90-day term of service ==
=== Preparations ===
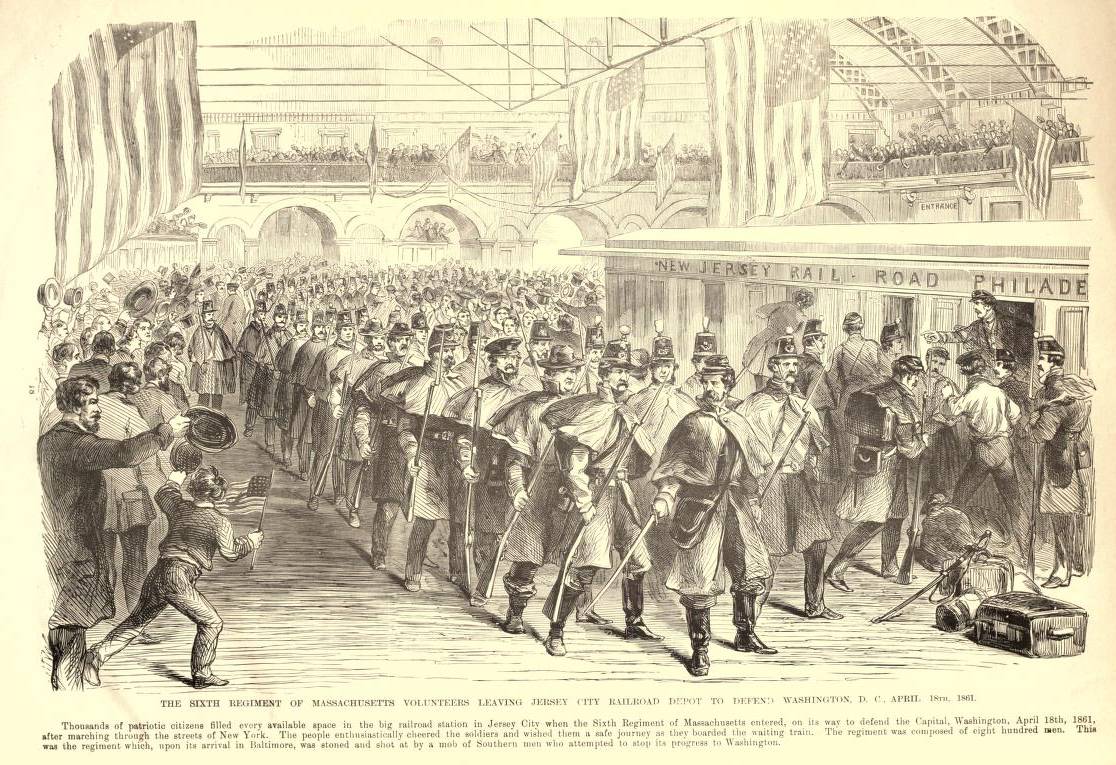
The 6th Massachusetts en route to Washington, April 18, 1861

Shortly after South Carolina issued its Declaration of Secession, Massachusetts Governor John A. Andrew anticipated imminent civil war and issued an order on January 16, 1861, to the ten existing Massachusetts units of peacetime militia to immediately reorganize and prepare for active service. Colonel Edward F. Jones was the first militia commander to respond to the Governor's order. His letter indicating the regiment's readiness, dated January 21, was brought to Boston and read in the Massachusetts Senate by then state Senator Benjamin F. Butler.

On April 15, 1861, three days after Confederate forces fired on Fort Sumter, President Lincoln issued a call for 75,000 volunteers to serve in putting down the insurrection. The call was relayed by Governor Andrew to the existing regiments of Massachusetts militia the same day. Eight companies of the original 6th Massachusetts (one from Acton, one from Groton, two from Lawrence, and four from Lowell) gathered in Lowell on April 16 and proceeded to Boston. That night, the men of the 6th Massachusetts barracked in Faneuil and Boylston Halls. The next morning, April 17, three companies previously belonging to other Massachusetts militia units (one from Boston, one from Stoneham, and another from Worcester) were added to the 6th Massachusetts to form a regiment of 11 companies total. Thus composed entirely of existing volunteer militia companies, the 6th Massachusetts was made up of volunteer soldiers. The regiment proceed that day to the State House, where Governor Andrew presented regimental colors to Colonel Jones. The 6th Massachusetts departed Boston for Washington via railroad at 7 p.m. on April 17.

=== Baltimore riot ===
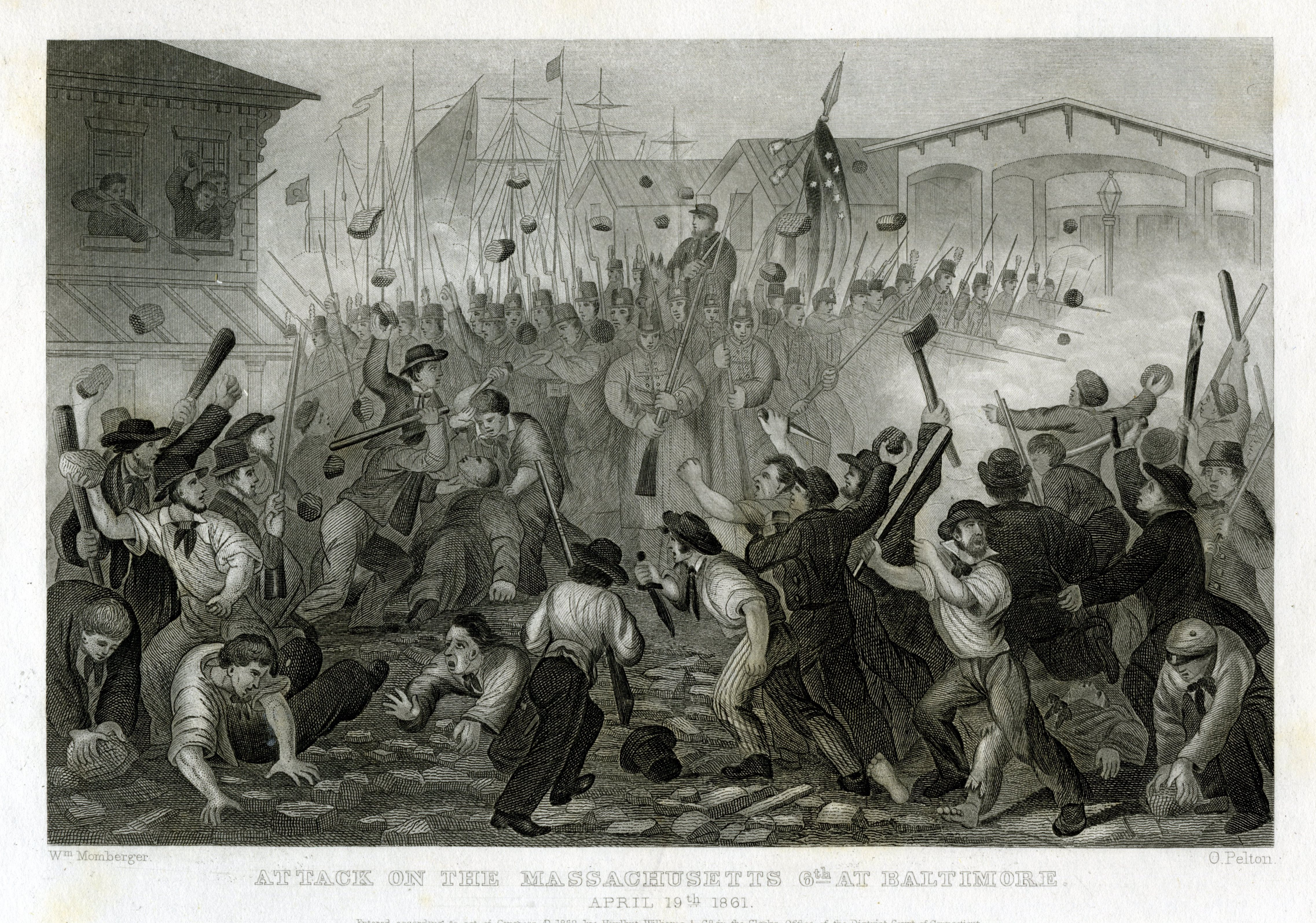
Mob attacks companies of the 6th Massachusetts Militia on Pratt Street during the Baltimore Riot.

On April 19, 1861, the 6th Massachusetts boarded train cars in Philadelphia in the early morning hours and departed for Washington via Baltimore. Before the end of the day, the regiment saw combat during the Baltimore Riot. The date was the anniversary of the Battles of Lexington and Concord which began the American Revolution.

Although Maryland remained in the Union, secessionist sentiment and support for the Confederacy was widespread in that state. Colonel Jones therefore expected a violent reception in Baltimore. He was also concerned about the possibility of sabotage to the tracks on the way to Baltimore which might cause derailment and potentially large casualties for the 6th Massachusetts. Jones ordered that a pilot locomotive precede the train that transported his regiment. The 6th Massachusetts arrived safely in Baltimore about 10 a.m.

Trains passing through Baltimore at that time could not proceed directly through the city without stopping. Southbound trains were decoupled at President Street Station on the east side of the city. Cars were drawn individually along rails on Pratt Street by horsepower to Camden Station on the west side of Baltimore's Inner Harbor, where the trains were reassembled. The initial cars encountered little resistance but soon a growing crowd of Baltimore citizens became increasingly agitated by the passing transports filled with troops. The crowd attacked the car carrying Company K with stones and bricks and derailed it by placing obstructions on the tracks. Railroad company workers managed to put the car back on track and Company K was the seventh and last company to reach Camden Station by rail. The crowd barricaded the rails by dumping cartloads of sand and dragging anchors from the nearby docks across them thus preventing further cars from passing.

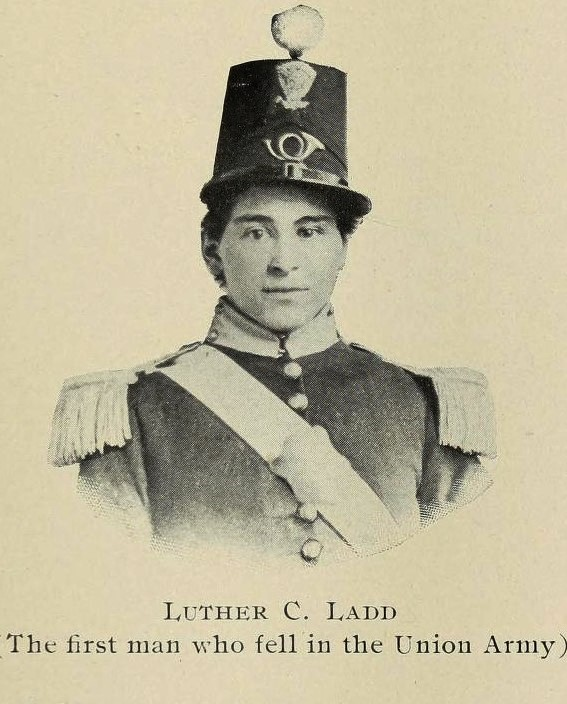
Private Ladd of the 6th Massachusetts was the first Union soldier killed in action during the Civil War.

The blockage of the railroad left four companies, numbering 220 men, at President Street Station with no choice but to march through the city to reach Camden Station, slightly more than one mile away. The size of the crowd obstructing their path was estimated at 10,000. Captain Follansbee, the senior captain, took charge of the detachment. After crossing the Pratt Street Bridge, which had been partially dismantled by the crowd, Follansbee ordered his men to march at the "double-quick." This roused the crowd further as they perceived the quickened pace as an indication of panic. As well as stones and bricks being thrown, shots were now fired at the 6th Massachusetts from the stores and houses around them. Captain Follansbee gave the order to return fire.

Seventeen-year-old Private Luther C. Ladd, a factory worker from Lowell, was hit in the head by a piece of scrap iron that was thrown from a rooftop and fractured his skull. As he staggered, one of the rioters took Ladd's musket from him and fired, wounding him in the leg. Ladd died on Pratt Street. He is known as the first Union soldier to be killed in action during the Civil War. Four other militiamen were killed or mortally wounded during the riot: Private Addison O. Whitney, Private Charles A. Taylor, Corporal Sumner Henry Needham and Sergeant John Ames. A total of 36 members of the 6th Massachusetts were wounded.

A formation of approximately 50 officers of the Baltimore Police eventually placed themselves between the rioters and the militiamen, allowing the 6th Massachusetts to proceed to Camden Station. The companies boarded the train which quickly got underway for Washington, though the crowd followed the train for some miles attempting to stop it. A total of 12 civilians were killed during the riot and an unknown number were injured.

=== Garrison duty ===
The 6th Massachusetts reached Washington, D.C., on April 19, 1861, the first unit to arrive in response to Lincoln's call for troops. A large, cheering crowd welcomed them at the Baltimore and Ohio Railroad Station which once stood north of the Capitol. Among the crowd was Clara Barton who became a famed nurse during the Civil War. At the time a clerk in the U.S. Patent Office, Barton gained her first experience in caring for wounded soldiers as she tended to injured men of the 6th Massachusetts.

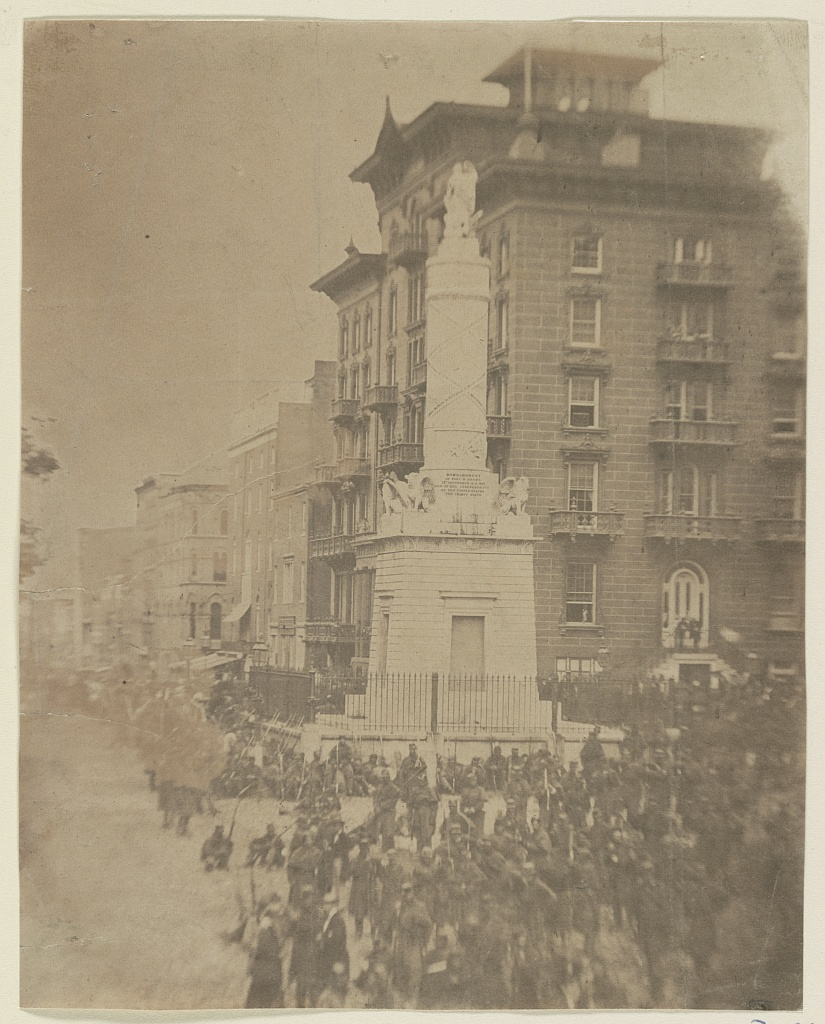
The 6th Massachusetts bivouacked in Monument Square in Baltimore on July 1, 1861, at the close of their second garrison encampment in the city.

The 6th Massachusetts was barracked in the Senate Chamber in the Capitol. The next morning, tensions in Washington were high as rumors circulated of an impending Confederate attack. After reviewing the 6th Massachusetts, Lincoln expressed his anxiety to the members of the regiment, telling them, "I don't believe there is any North. The Seventh Regiment [New York] is a myth. Rhode Island is not known in our geography any longer. You are the only northern realities."

In the days and weeks after the Baltimore Riot, newspapers and politicians across the country drew comparisons between the Massachusetts militia who had fought on April 19, 1775, at the start of the Revolution and the Massachusetts troops who fought on April 19, 1861. Among the 6th Massachusetts were descendants of those Minutemen who had fought in Lexington and Concord in 1775. Due to the coincidence of the date and the ancestry of some members, the 6th Massachusetts was often called the "Minutemen of '61."

The 6th Massachusetts remained in Washington until May 5, when they were assigned to garrison a key railroad relay station about 15 miles outside of Baltimore at Elkridge. Their presence there helped keep open the crucial rail line from the northeastern states to Washington. The regiment returned to Baltimore on May 13, when Major General Benjamin F. Butler occupied the city with several Union regiments in anticipation of a Confederate attack on Baltimore which never developed. The 6th Massachusetts marched through the city to Federal Hill, where they set up camp for a short stay of three days. On May 16, the regiment returned to the Elkridge relay station. They served out the majority of their term at the relay station and vicinity, except for a second assignment in Baltimore from June 26 to July 1, 1861. On July 4, a silk American flag was presented to the regiment by group of unionist from Baltimore. In the canton the stars were arranged in 2 rings, inside the first ring of was the inscription: "Loyal citizens of Baltimore to the 6th regiment of Massachusetts." Inside the second ring was words: "Pratt street, April 19, 1861."

The regiment's return to Boston at the close of their 90-day term was delayed slightly by special request of Major General Nathaniel P. Banks. In light of the recent Union defeat at the First Battle of Bull Run, in which the 6th Massachusetts did not participate, he asked the regiment voluntarily remain at Elkridge another week in the event of a Confederate advance on Washington. On July 29, the 6th Massachusetts received orders to break camp and boarded trains for Boston which was reached on August 1. The regiment was mustered out on August 2, 1861.

== 9-month term of service ==
=== Organization and departure ===
The regiment was again activated for federal service following Lincoln's call in August 1862 for 300,000 troops to serve for nine months. Seven of the ten original companies returned for the second period of service. Members who had served during the regiment's first term were not compelled to reenlist. While many did reenlist, considerable recruiting of new volunteers was necessary in order to fill out the companies and thus the roster during the second term was different than the 90-day term. To complete the regiment, an additional three companies, made up entirely of fresh recruits, were organized. The roster of officers during the nine months term was substantially the same as the 90-day term. Follansbee, who had assumed command of the detached companies engaged in the Baltimore Riot, was promoted to colonel and commanded the regiment during its second term of service. The unit was mustered in at Camp Henry Wilson in Lowell beginning August 31, 1862. The 6th Massachusetts departed Boston on September 9 on board the steamship Plymouth Rock. Arriving in New York, the regiment traveled by rail through Baltimore and on to Washington. The unit received a very different welcome in Baltimore during their second term and were given a large reception with food and drink and much cheering from the citizens of the city.

=== Blackwater River expeditions ===
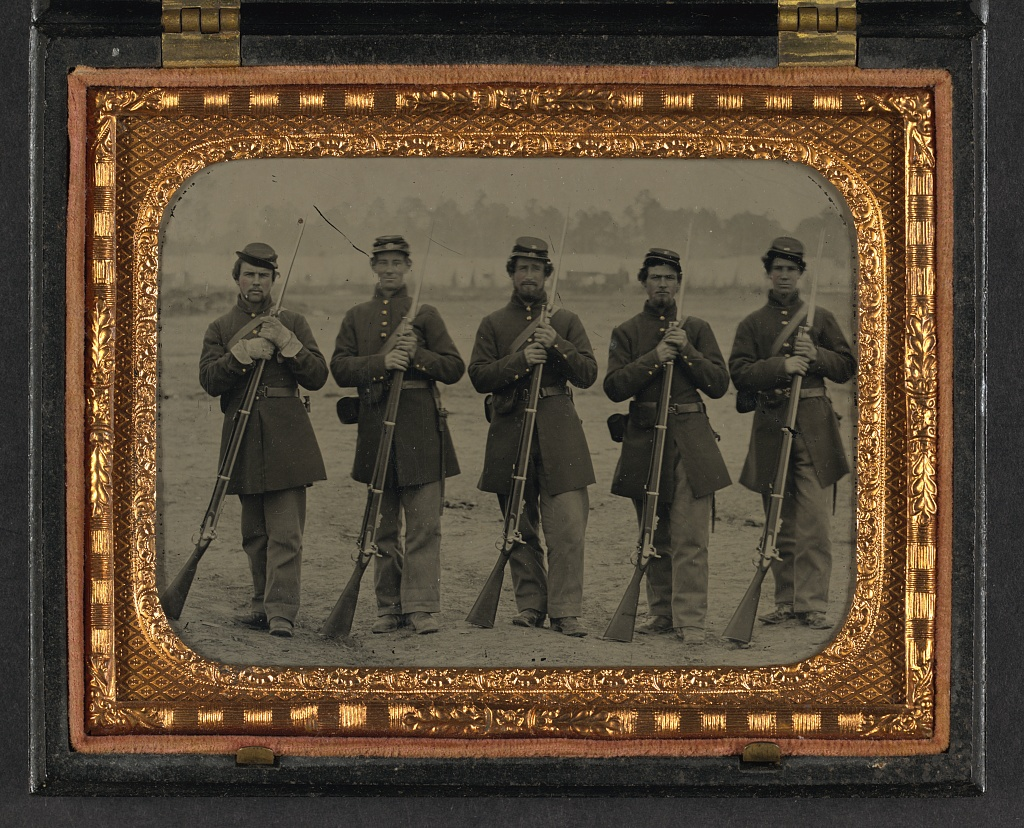
Five soldiers of the 6th Massachusetts during their second term of service, photo likely taken in camp near Suffolk, Virginia

Upon reaching Washington, the regiment was ordered to Fortress Monroe and from there to Suffolk, Virginia. The 6th Massachusetts was assigned to the Second Brigade (commanded by Colonel Robert S. Foster) of the First Division of the VII Corps. They served garrison and picket duty in the vicinity of Suffolk, occasionally taking part in reconnaissance expeditions to the Blackwater River (which represented the boundary between the Union occupied counties of southeast Virginia and Confederate territory of the interior) and engaged in minor skirmish actions.

Their first such expedition took place on October 3, 1862, about two weeks after the regiment reached Suffolk. The 6th Massachusetts formed a peripheral part of the Expedition against Franklin, a joint effort of the U.S. Army and Navy to dislodge a growing force of Confederates threatening the Union garrison at Suffolk. The 6th Massachusetts held a road near Western Branch Church, far from the main action at Franklin, and here loaded their muskets for the first time in action. Although the 6th Massachusetts did not see any combat during their first expedition, and many members recalled it as tedious, the sight of ambulances carrying dead and wounded from the battle made a strong impression on the new recruits. During a second expedition to the Blackwater on December 11, 1862, the 6th Massachusetts was lightly engaged near Zuni, Virginia, and lost their first casualty in battle during their second enlistment—2nd Lieutenant Robert G. Barr. The regiment did not again leave Suffolk until an expedition on January 29, 1863, again towards the Blackwater River. Confederates opposed this Union advance on January 30 during the Battle of Deserted House in an isolated location about ten miles west of Suffolk. The 6th Massachusetts was sharply engaged and lost five killed and seven wounded.

=== Siege of Suffolk ===
The majority of the regiment's time, when not on expeditions, was spent in fatigue duty building fortifications around Suffolk. This included digging trenches and clearing trees in front of the defensive lines. The hard labor had a detrimental effect on the general morale of the Union troops stationed at Suffolk. This was exacerbated by antagonistic feelings between the civilians of occupied Suffolk and the enlisted men of the 6th Massachusetts.

In early 1863, Major General James Longstreet was given command of the Confederate Department of North Carolina and Southern Virginia. His objectives were to defend Richmond from attack from the southeast, forage for supplies in Union controlled southeastern Virginia and to dislodge the Union garrison at Suffolk. Longstreet began the siege of Suffolk on April 11, 1863. The 6th Massachusetts occupied a position on the right of the Union defensive siege lines at a location called Fort Nansemond by the bank of the Nansemond River. For 22 days, the regiment engaged in frequent exchanges of fire with opposing forces though no significant assault was made by the Confederates.

On May 3, 1863, Longstreet abandoned the siege and began moving his forces north to rejoin the Army of Northern Virginia. The next day, the 6th Massachusetts was among the units sent in pursuit of the retreating Confederate force. Only minor skirmishing took place as the bulk of the Confederate force had already escaped beyond reach of the Union infantry. The 6th Massachusetts took about 80 Confederate stragglers prisoner and burned every building they came across along the Somerton Road to deny shelter to any additional Confederate stragglers or deserters.

=== Battle of Carrsville and Medal of Honor recipient ===
Major General John A. Dix, commanding Union forces at Suffolk, conducted several reconnaissances in force to determine the disposition of Confederate forces remaining in the region. On May 13, the 6th Massachusetts joined another expedition to the Blackwater River. This was the final action of their second term of service. The column was commanded by Major General Foster and Colonel Follansbee was promoted to command of the brigade to which the 6th Massachusetts belonged. A considerable Confederate force attacked the Union expedition in a sharp engagement on May 14–15, 1863, known as the Battle of Carrsville or the Battle of Holland House. During this fight, the 6th Massachusetts supported the 7th Massachusetts Battery and exchanged in heavy, prolonged firing with the Confederates. The 6th Massachusetts made an advance, driving the enemy into the woods, then were driven back and made a second counter-attack, reclaiming their position at the start of the battle. The regiment suffered casualties of five killed or mortally wounded, twelve wounded and five prisoners.

In the middle of the battle, when the 6th Massachusetts was driven back, Private Joseph S.G. Sweatt of Company C perceived that several of his comrades had been hit and were left in the woods. In an effort to pull them out, he rushed forward, towards the Confederate position. In this action, he earned the Medal of Honor. According to his citation, "When ordered to retreat, this soldier turned and rushed back to the front, in the face of heavy fire from the enemy, in an endeavor to rescue his wounded comrades, remaining by them until overpowered and taken prisoner." Sweatt was eventually released; the three men he endeavored to rescue did not survive.

On May 18, the 6th Massachusetts and other regiments fell back to Deserted House outside of Suffolk. On May 20 they were posted in support of artillery at Windsor, Virginia. Finally, on May 23, the 6th Massachusetts received orders to return to Massachusetts. The regiment reached Boston by steamship on May 26 to be welcomed and addressed in front of the State House by Governor Andrew. The 6th Massachusetts then proceeded to Lowell, where they were received with enthusiastic festivities. The regiment reassembled on June 3, 1863, at Camp Wilson and were mustered out. In all during their second enlistment, the regiment lost 13 men killed or mortally wounded in combat and 18 by disease.

== 100-day term of service ==
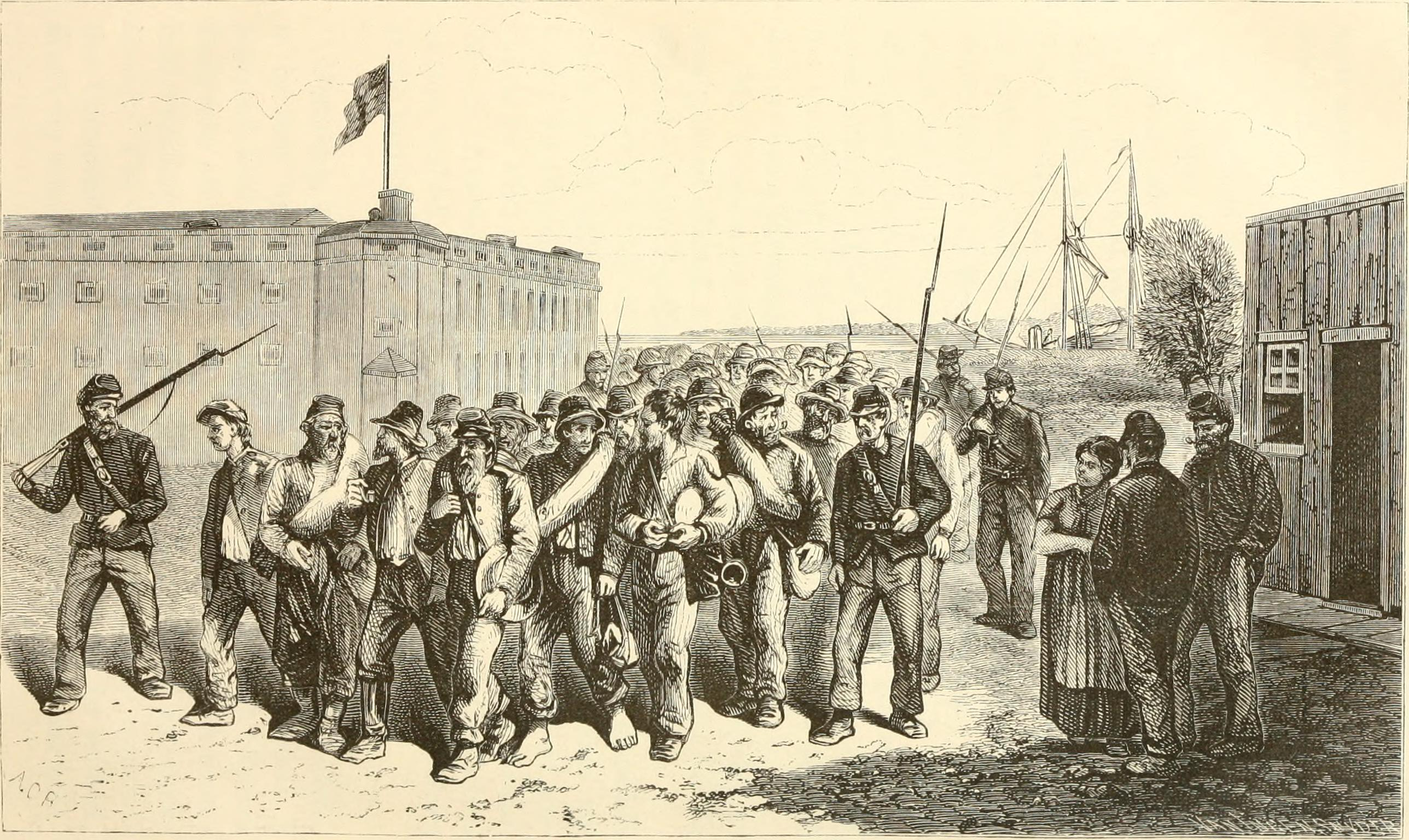
At Fort Delaware, Union guards (unit unidentified) "perambulating" a group of Confederate prisoners around the island

In May 1864, Major General Ulysses S. Grant removed fresh troops from the defensive fortifications of Washington and transferred them into the field to strengthen the Army of the Potomac. To man defenses around the capital in their place, and to relieve regiments at various northern fortifications, Lincoln issued a call for 500,000 troops to serve a brief term of 100 days. This measure would allow enough time to raise longer-term regiments to occupy rearward defenses. The 6th Massachusetts was activated for a third time in response to this call for 100-day regiments.

The regiment organized at Camp Meigs in Readville, Massachusetts, just outside of Boston beginning July 13, 1864. Colonel Follansbee again commanded the regiment. The roster of field and staff officers was fundamentally the same as their previous nine-month term of service. They departed on July 20 for Washington, reaching the city on July 22. They were posted on Arlington Heights in Fort C.F. Smith. Their month of service there was mundane, consisting of regular drills, inspections and fatigue duty.

On August 21, 1864, the regiment was ordered to move. They traveled by rail to Philadelphia and by steamship to Fort Delaware on Pea Patch Island on the Delaware River. The regiment relieved the 157th Ohio Infantry and commenced garrison and guard duty over the 7,000 Confederate prisoners of war held at Fort Delaware. There had been widespread instances of mistreatment of prisoners by Union units that previously garrisoned the fort, including abuse and theft of prisoners' property. Members of the 6th Massachusetts condemned these practices and generally refrained from similar abuses. Their duty consisted of standing post and escorting prisoners on various work details. The fort was large and in excellent condition. The barracks were newly constructed, comfortable, and included a library and other amenities. The field and staff officers as well as several company officers were joined by their wives and children at the post. The regimental historian recorded that many members of the unit remember their time at Fort Delaware as extremely pleasant.

On October 19, 1864, the 6th Massachusetts was relieved and began the journey back to Boston, which they reached on October 21. The regiment reported to Camp Meigs on October 27, 1864, and were mustered out for the third and last time. During their third term, the regiment lost 10 men to disease.

== Ladd and Whitney memorial ==
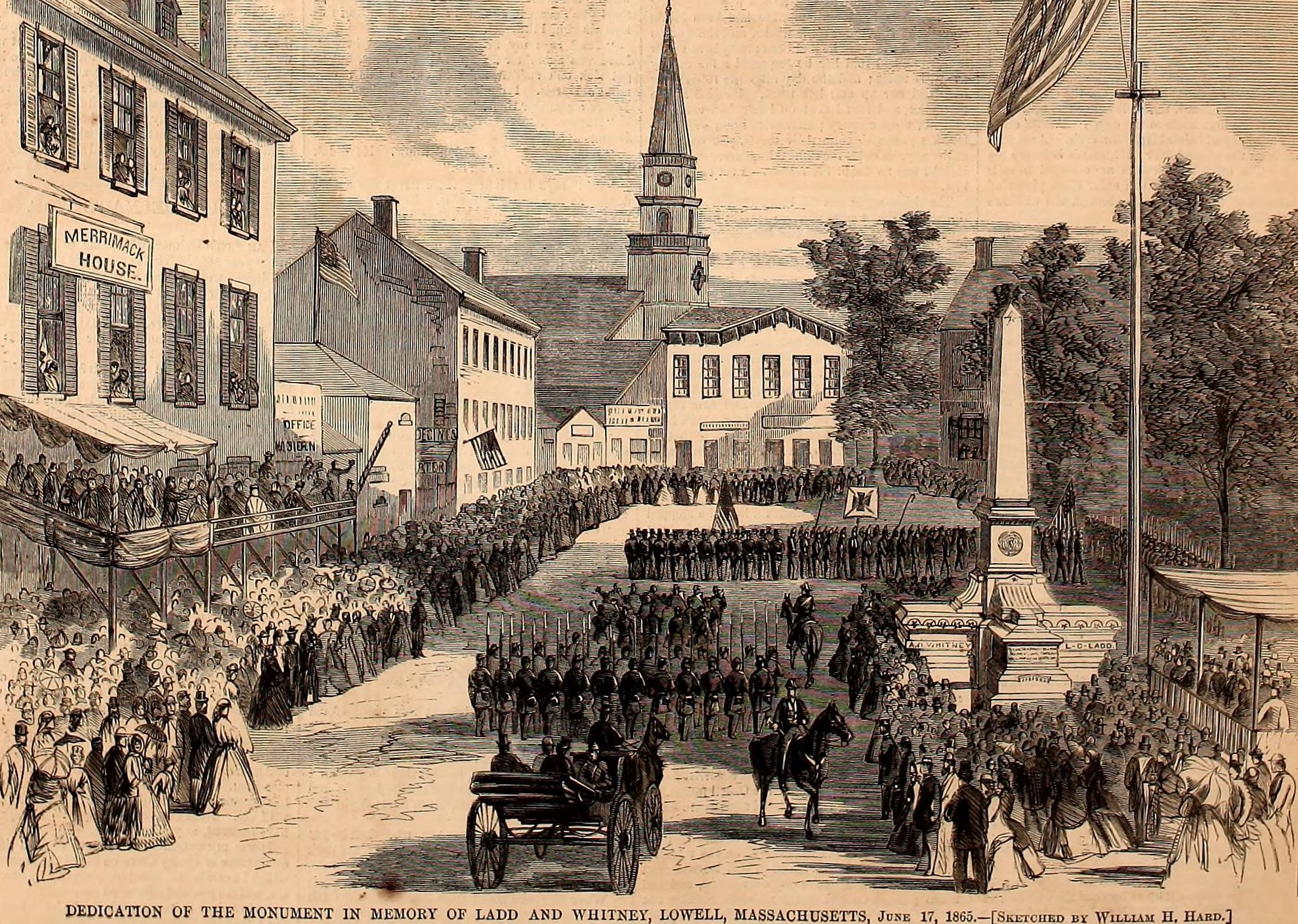
1865 dedication of the Ladd and Whitney monument in Lowell

Shortly after the bodies of Privates Luther Ladd and Addison Whitney were brought home to Lowell, Massachusetts, after the Baltimore Riot, city officials began planning the construction of a monument honoring their sacrifice and memorializing the first casualties of the Civil War. An appropriation of $2,000 was secured from the Commonwealth of Massachusetts and a further $2,700 was provided by the city. The monument was constructed in front of the Lowell courthouse in what is now known as Monument Square. Ladd and Whitney had both been buried in the Lowell Cemetery. On April 28, 1865, their remains were re-interred in a vault beneath the monument. The monument was to be dedicated on April 19, 1865, on the anniversary of the Baltimore Riot, but the ceremonies were delayed due to the assassination of President Lincoln. It was instead dedicated on the anniversary of the Battle of Bunker Hill, a local holiday, June 17, 1865. The procession numbered more than 4,500 people. Governor Andrew gave the oration acknowledging the men whom he called "the first martyrs of the great rebellion."

== Later units ==
The 6th Massachusetts continued as a peacetime militia unit following the Civil War, typically meeting for annual musters at various camps in Massachusetts. During reorganizations of the Massachusetts militia in 1866 and 1877, the 6th Massachusetts was consolidated and some of its companies disbanded or transferred, but the regimental organization remained intact. The regiment was again activated during the Spanish–American War. The 6th Massachusetts of 1898 participated in the Puerto Rican Campaign.

The 181st Infantry Regiment, which was formed from elements of other units and first inducted into federal service on January 16, 1941, claims lineage from the 6th Massachusetts and other militia units. As of 2017, the 1st Battalion of this regiment was active as an element of the Massachusetts National Guard.

== See also ==
- Massachusetts in the Civil War
- List of Massachusetts Civil War units
