= Luther C. Ladd =

American soldier (1843-1861)

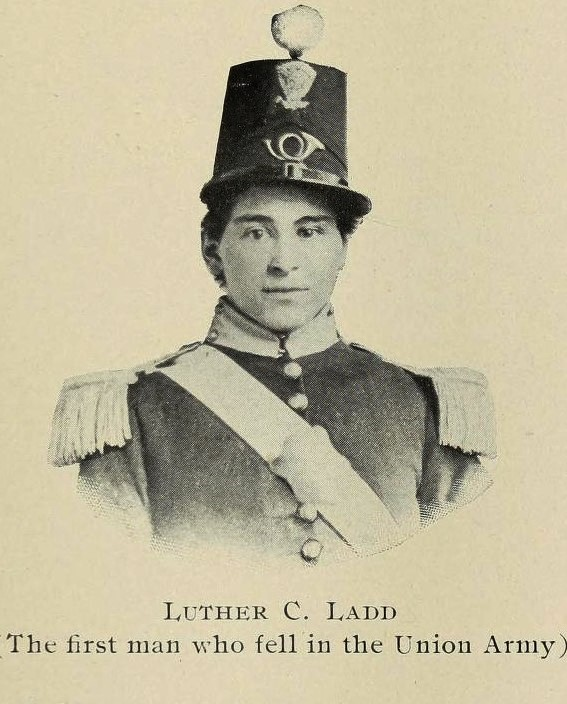
Private Ladd of the 6th Massachusetts was the first Union soldier killed in action during the Civil War

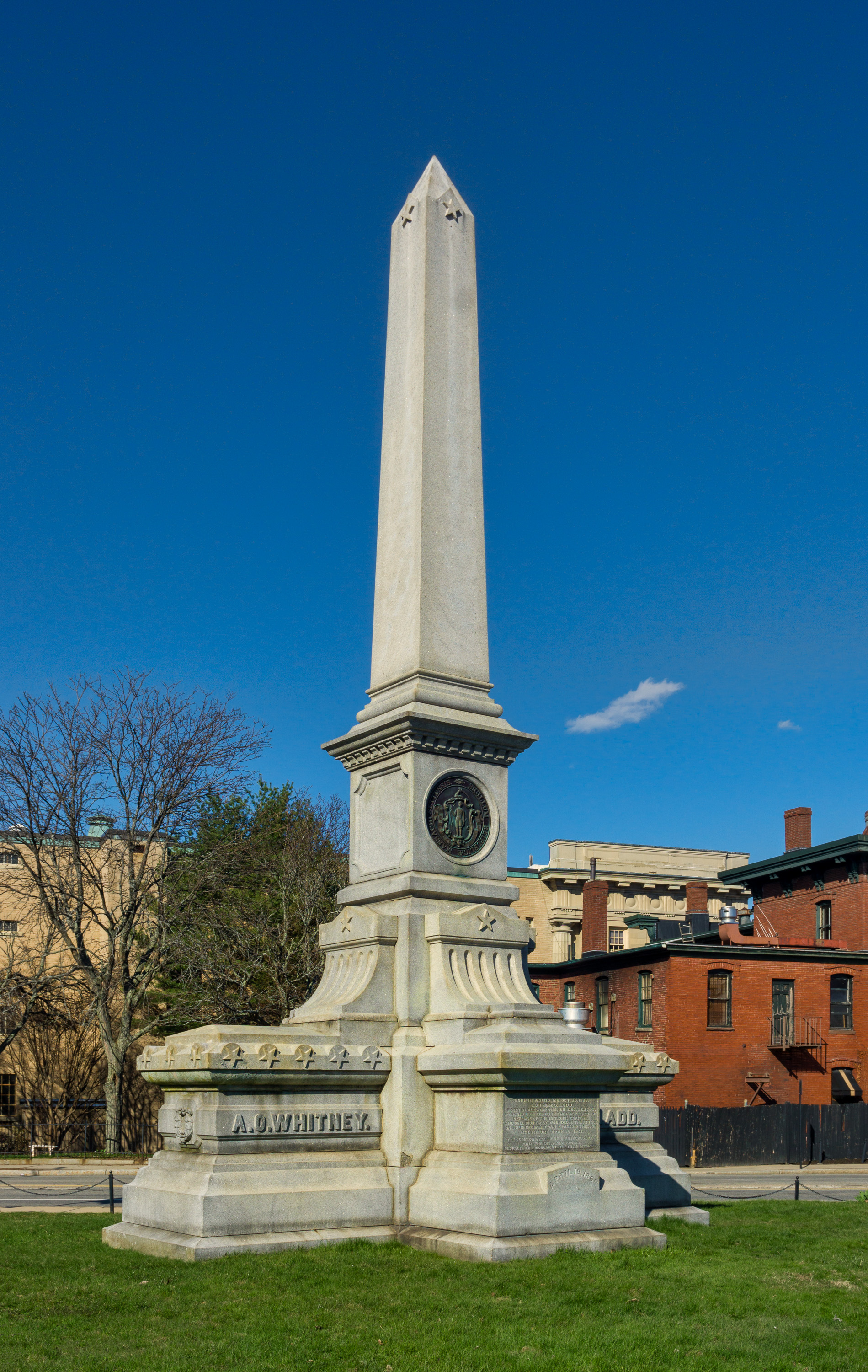
Ladd & Whitney Monument in downtown Lowell.

Luther Crawford Ladd (22 December 1843 – 19 April 1861) was a soldier in the Union Army who was killed during the Baltimore riot of 1861. He is often referred to as the first Union soldier killed in action during the American Civil War. Luther Crawford Ladd was 17 years old at the time of his death.

On April 13, 1861, Private Daniel Hough became the first non-combat casualty of the war when he was accidentally killed by a cannon that exploded along with an ammunition pile next to the gun during a salute to the flag at the U.S. Army's surrender of Fort Sumter to Confederate forces on April 13, 1861. Private Edward Galloway was mortally wounded by the same explosion and died three days later.

Luther C. Ladd was born in Bristol, New Hampshire, the son of John Ladd. He resided on the Ladd farm, south of Fowler's River. In 1853 Luther and his father moved to nearby Alexandria, New Hampshire, where he attended district schools. At age 16 in 1860, Ladd left Alexandria for Lowell, Massachusetts, where he obtained employment at the Lowell Machine Shop. In April 1861 Luther answered President Lincoln's first call for 75,000 men by enlisting for three months in Co. D, 6th Massachusetts Militia. On April 19, 1861 while marching through the city of Baltimore this regiment was attacked by an angry mob. Luther C. Ladd was the first to fall. His injuries included a fractured skull and a fatal bullet wound that severed an artery in his thigh. Luther C. Ladd's remains were interred in the Alexandria Village Cemetery, later to be removed and buried beneath the Ladd & Whitney monument in Lowell, Massachusetts.
