= William Price Craighill =

United States Army Chief of Engineers

- Born: July 1, 1833; Charles Town, Virginia
- Died: January 18, 1909 (aged 75); Charles Town, West Virginia
- Military career
- Allegiance: United States of America; Union
- Branch: United States Army; Union Army
- Service years: 1853–1897
- Rank: Brigadier General
- Commands: Chief of Engineers
- Conflicts: American Civil War

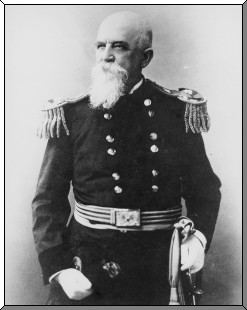

William Price Craighill (July 1, 1833 – January 18, 1909) was born in Charles Town, Virginia (now West Virginia), son of William Nathaniel Craighill and Sarah Elizabeth Brown. He was an author, Union Army officer in the American Civil War, and later served as Chief of Engineers.

== Army Corps of Engineers ==
A classmate of Philip Sheridan, John Bell Hood, and James B. McPherson, Craighill ranked second in the United States Military Academy class of 1853 and was commissioned in the United States Army Corps of Engineers. After working on several Atlantic coast forts including Fort Delaware, he taught engineering at the Military Academy from 1859 to 1862.

== Civil War ==
As a Virginian who stood for the Union Army, Craighill was division and department engineer during the American Civil War and worked on the defenses of Pittsburgh, Baltimore, San Francisco, and New York City.

Craighill wrote the 1862 Army Officer's Pocket Companion: A Manual for Staff Officers in the Field, one of the first Army field manuals. He also translated Antoine-Henri Jomini's the Art of War from French, with George H. Mendell in 1862.

== Post war ==
After the Civil War, Craighill superintended construction of defenses at Baltimore Harbor and Hampton Roads. He headed the Engineer Office in Baltimore from 1870 to 1895, overseeing river and harbor work in Maryland and parts of Virginia and North Carolina. When the Corps began to build locks and dams on the Kanawha River in West Virginia in 1875, Craighill assumed charge there as well. He completed the first of the moveable wicket dams built in the United States, after visiting France to study their use. He became the Corps' first Southeast Division Engineer. He was a member of the Board of Engineers from 1886 to 1889. He was appointed Chief of Engineers by President Grover Cleveland in 1895.

He retired two years later and died in Charles Town, West Virginia.

Military offices
Preceded by Thomas Lincoln Casey	Chief of Engineers; 1895–1897	Succeeded by John Moulder Wilson
