= 6th Delaware Infantry Regiment =

Union Army regiment in the American Civil War

- Active: December 18, 1862 – September 5, 1863
- Country: United States of America
- Role: Infantry
- Size: 919
- Engagements: American Civil War

The 6th Delaware Infantry Regiment was an infantry regiment of the Union Army in the American Civil War. The regiment was formed in Delaware in late 1862 with a 90-day term of enlistment. According to the regiment's service terms, the men of the regiment would continue their civilian occupations, drilling twice a week, until called upon for active duty; they would not be paid until they entered active service. The regiment completed formation on December 18, 1862, but would not be called into active service until June 27, 1863, under the command of Colonel Edwin Wilmer. While on active service, the regiment guarded a railroad in Maryland and also guarded prisoners of war at Fort Delaware. By August 23, all but one of the regiment's companies had been mustered out of service; the final one, Company I, ended its service on September 5.

== History ==
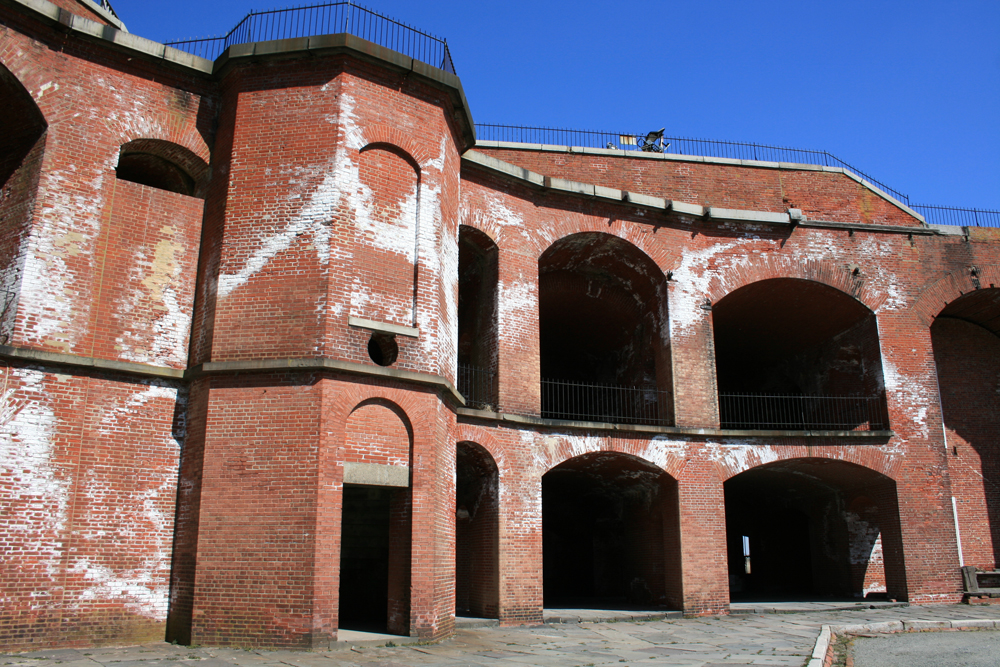
Fort Delaware, where the regiment was stationed in mid-1863

During the middle of 1862, President Abraham Lincoln issued a request for 300,000 men to join the Union Army as 90-day volunteers. Later that year, the 5th Delaware Infantry Regiment and the 6th Delaware Infantry Regiment began forming in answer to this call. As allowed by the terms of service for the regiments, the men would remain in their civilian occupations until they were needed for active service; the men drilled twice a week, although they would only be paid while they were mobilized for active duty. On October 25, the 6th's Company A was formed, with Edwin Wilmer as the company's captain. Much of the regimental organization was done by lawyer Jacob Moore, although Wilmer also participated. Organization was completed on December 18, the date that Company I completed formation. Initially, the ten companies of the 6th Delaware, designated with the letters A–I and K, were attached to the 5th Delaware, but were split off to form a separate regiment by order of William Cannon, Governor of Delaware, on June 27, 1863. Wilmer was appointed the new regiment's colonel, Moore the lieutenant colonel, and Thomas P. Thurlow was major.

The 877 men and 42 officers of the regiment entered active service that same day. After mobilizing, the regiment was sent to Havre de Grace, Maryland, where it guarded the Philadelphia, Wilmington and Baltimore Railroad near the Susquehanna River. While at Havre de Grace, the regiment was part of the 8th Corps within the Middle Department. The regiment had been mobilized in part due to a perceived threat to the region, and also to guard an influx of prisoners of war that had arrived at Fort Delaware. The 5th Delaware had also been activated to perform the same duties; between the two regiments, 1,500 men guarded the railroad and 400 were sent to Fort Delaware. Besides Havre de Grace, the 6th Delaware also guarded the railroad at the Bush and Back Rivers and the Maryland towns of Gunpowder and Perrymansville. By August 23, all of the 6th Delaware had been mustered out of service except for Company I, which ended its service on September 5. Over the course of the regiment's service, 10 member of the unit succumbed to disease.

== See also ==
- List of Delaware Civil War units
- Delaware in the American Civil War
