= Battle of Five Forks order of battle =

The order of battle for the Battle of Five Forks includes:

- Battle of Five Forks order of battle: Confederate
- Battle of Five Forks order of battle: Union
