= David Buckingham =

David Buckingham may refer to:

- A. David Buckingham (1930–2021), Australian chemist
- David Buckingham (politician), Canadian politician
- David E. Buckingham (1840–1915), American soldier in the American Civil War
- David Buckingham (academic) (born 1954), media, communications and education scholar and academic
- David Buckingham (judge), American judge in Kentucky
