= Battle of Five Forks order of battle: Union =

American Civil War history

The following Union Army units and commanders fought in the Battle of Five Forks of the American Civil War. The Confederate order of battle is listed separately.

== Abbreviations used ==
=== Military rank ===
- MG = Major General
- BG = Brigadier General
- Col = Colonel
- Ltc = Lieutenant Colonel
- Maj = Major
- Cpt = Captain
- Lt = 1st Lieutenant
- Bvt = Brevet

=== Other ===
- w = wounded
- mw = mortally wounded
- k = killed

== Army of the Shenandoah ==
MG Philip Sheridan, Commanding

=== V Corps ===
MG Gouverneur K. Warren [relieved]
Bvt MG Charles Griffin

Division	Brigade	Regiments and Others
First Division Bvt MG Charles Griffin; Bvt MG Joseph J. Bartlett Escort: 4th Pennsylvania Cavalry (Co. C): 104th New York	1st Brigade BG Joshua Chamberlain	185th New York: Col Gustavus Sniper; 198th Pennsylvania: Maj Edwin A. Glenn (mw), Cpt John Stanton
First Division Bvt MG Charles Griffin; Bvt MG Joseph J. Bartlett Escort: 4th Pennsylvania Cavalry (Co. C): 104th New York	2nd Brigade Bvt BG Edgar M. Gregory	187th New York: Ltc Daniel Meyers; 188th New York: Ltc Isaac Doolittle; 189th New York: Ltc Joseph G. Townsend
First Division Bvt MG Charles Griffin; Bvt MG Joseph J. Bartlett Escort: 4th Pennsylvania Cavalry (Co. C): 104th New York	3rd Brigade Bvt MG Joseph J. Bartlett; Bvt BG Alfred L. Pearson	20th Maine: Ltc Walter Goodale Morrill; 1st Maine Sharpshooters: Cpt George R. Abbott; 32nd Massachusetts: Ltc James A. Cunningham; 1st Michigan: Ltc George Lockley; 16th Michigan: Bvt Col Benjamin F. Partridge; 83rd Pennsylvania: Col Chauncey P. Rogers; 91st Pennsylvania: Ltc Eli G. Sellers; 118th Pennsylvania: Ltc Henry O'Neill; 155th Pennsylvania: Bvt BG Alfred L. Pearson, Maj John A. Kline
Second Division Bvt MG Romeyn B. Ayres	1st Brigade Bvt BG Frederick Winthrop (k); Col James G. Grindlay	61st Massachusetts: Ltc Charles F. Walcott; 5th New York: Cpt Henry Schickhardt; 15th New York Heavy Artillery: Ltc Michael Wiedrich (w), Maj Louis Eiche; 114th Pennsylvania: Col Charles H. T. Collis; 2nd U.S.: 8th U.S.: 11th U.S.: 12th U.S.: 14th U.S.: 17th U.S.:
Second Division Bvt MG Romeyn B. Ayres	2nd Brigade Col Richard N. Bowerman (w); Col David L. Stanton	1st Maryland: Col David L. Stanton; 4th Maryland: Maj Harrison Aderon; 7th Maryland: Maj Edward M. Mobley; 8th Maryland: Ltc Ernest F. M. Faehtz
Second Division Bvt MG Romeyn B. Ayres	3rd Brigade Bvt BG James Gwyn	3rd Delaware: Cpt John H. Cade; 4th Delaware: Cpt William H. Maclary (k), Ltc Moses B. Gist; 8th Delaware (3 companies): Cpt John N. Richards; 190th Pennsylvania: Bvt Col Joseph B. Pattee; 191st Pennsylvania: Col James Carle; 210th Pennsylvania: Ltc Edward L. Witman
Third Division Bvt MG Samuel W. Crawford	1st Brigade Col John Azor Kellogg	91st New York: Col Jonathan Tarbell; 1st New York Sharpshooter Battalion: 91st Pennsylvania: 6th Wisconsin: Cpt Edward A. Whaley (w), Cpt Louis A. Kent; 7th Wisconsin: Ltc Hollon Richardson (w)
Third Division Bvt MG Samuel W. Crawford	2nd Brigade BG Henry Baxter	16th Maine: Col Charles W. Tilden; 39th Massachusetts: Ltc Henry M. Tremlett; 97th New York: Ltc Rouse Eglston; 11th Pennsylvania: Maj John B. Overmyer; 107th Pennsylvania: Col Thomas F. McCoy
Third Division Bvt MG Samuel W. Crawford	3rd Brigade Bvt BG Richard Coulter	94th New York: Maj Henry H. Fish (k), Cpt Albert T. Morgan; 95th New York: Cpt George T. Knight; 147th New York: Cpt James A. McKinley; 56th Pennsylvania: Maj Henry A. Laycock; 88th Pennsylvania: Maj Henry A. Laycock; 121st Pennsylvania: Maj West Funk; 142nd Pennsylvania: Ltc Horatio N. Warren

=== Cavalry Corps ===
Bvt MG Wesley Merritt

Division	Brigade	Regiments and Others
First Division BG Thomas Devin	1st Brigade Col Peter Stagg	1st Michigan Cavalry: Ltc George R. Maxwell (w), Cpt Edward L. Negus; 5th Michigan Cavalry: Ltc Smith H. Hastings; 6th Michigan Cavalry: Ltc Harvey H. Vinton; 7th Michigan Cavalry: Ltc George G. Briggs
First Division BG Thomas Devin	2nd Brigade Col Charles Lane Fitzhugh	6th New York Cavalry: Maj Harrison White; 9th New York Cavalry: Maj James R. Dinnin; 19th New York Cavalry: Maj Howard M. Smith; 17th Pennsylvania Cavalry: Ltc Coe Durland; 20th Pennsylvania Cavalry: Ltc Gabriel Middleton
First Division BG Thomas Devin	3rd Brigade BG Alfred Gibbs	2nd Massachusetts Cavalry: Col Caspar Crowninshield; 6th Pennsylvania Cavalry: Col Charles L. Leiper; 1st U.S. Cavalry: Cpt Richard S. C. Lord; 5th U.S. Cavalry: Cpt Thomas Drummond (k), Lt Gustuvus Urban; 6th U.S. Cavalry: Maj Robert N. Morris
Second Division MG George Crook	1st Brigade Bvt MG Henry Eugene Davies	1st New Jersey Cavalry: Col Hugh H. Janeway; 10th New York Cavalry: Col Mathew Henry Avery; 24th New York Cavalry: Col Walter C. Newberry, Ltc Melze Richards; 1st Pennsylvania Cavalry (5 companies): Maj Hampton S. Thomas
Second Division MG George Crook	2nd Brigade Bvt BG John I. Gregg	4th Pennsylvania Cavalry: Col Alender P. Duncan; 16th Pennsylvania Cavalry: Ltc John K. Robinson; 21st Pennsylvania Cavalry: Col Oliver P. Knowles
Second Division MG George Crook	3rd Brigade Bvt BG Charles H. Smith	1st Maine Cavalry: Ltc John P. Cilley; 2nd New York Mounted Rifles: Maj Paul Chadbourne; 6th Ohio Cavalry: Cpt Matthew H. Cryer; 13th Ohio Cavalry: Ltc Stephen R. Clark
Artillery	Horse Artillery	1st U.S., Battery H: Lt Chandler P. Eakin; 1st U.S., Battery I: Lt Chandler P. Eakin; 2nd U.S., Battery A: Lt James H. Lord
Third Division Bvt MG George Armstrong Custer	1st Brigade Col Alexander C. M. Pennington	1st Connecticut Cavalry: Col Brayton Ives; 3rd New Jersey Cavalry: Ltc William P. Robeson (w); 2nd New York Cavalry: Col Alanson Merwin Randol; 2nd Ohio Cavalry: Cpt Albert Barnitz
Third Division Bvt MG George Armstrong Custer	2nd Brigade Bvt BG William Wells	3rd Indiana Cavalry: 8th New York Cavalry: Maj James Bliss; 15th New York Cavalry: Col John J. Coppinger; 1st Vermont Cavalry: Ltc Josiah Hall
Third Division Bvt MG George Armstrong Custer	3rd Brigade Col Henry Capehart	1st New York Cavalry: Ltc Jenyns C. Batterysby; 1st West Virginia Cavalry: Maj Shesh B. Howe; 2nd West Virginia Cavalry (7 companies): Ltc James Allen; 3rd West Virginia Cavalry: Maj John S. Witcher
Mackenzie's Cavalry Division BG Ranald S. Mackenzie	1st Brigade Col Robert M. West	20th New York Cavalry, Company G: Cpt Thomas H. Butler; 5th Pennsylvania Cavalry: Ltc Christopher Kleinz
Mackenzie's Cavalry Division BG Ranald S. Mackenzie	2nd Brigade Col Samuel P. Spear (w); Col Andrew W. Evans	1st District of Columbia Cavalry: Maj J. Stannard Baker; 1st Maryland Cavalry: Col Andrew W. Evans; 11th Pennsylvania Cavalry: Ltc Franklin A. Stratton
Mackenzie's Cavalry Division BG Ranald S. Mackenzie	Artillery	4th Wisconsin: Cpt Dorman L. Noggle

== See also ==
- Virginia in the American Civil War
