= 7th Delaware Infantry Regiment =

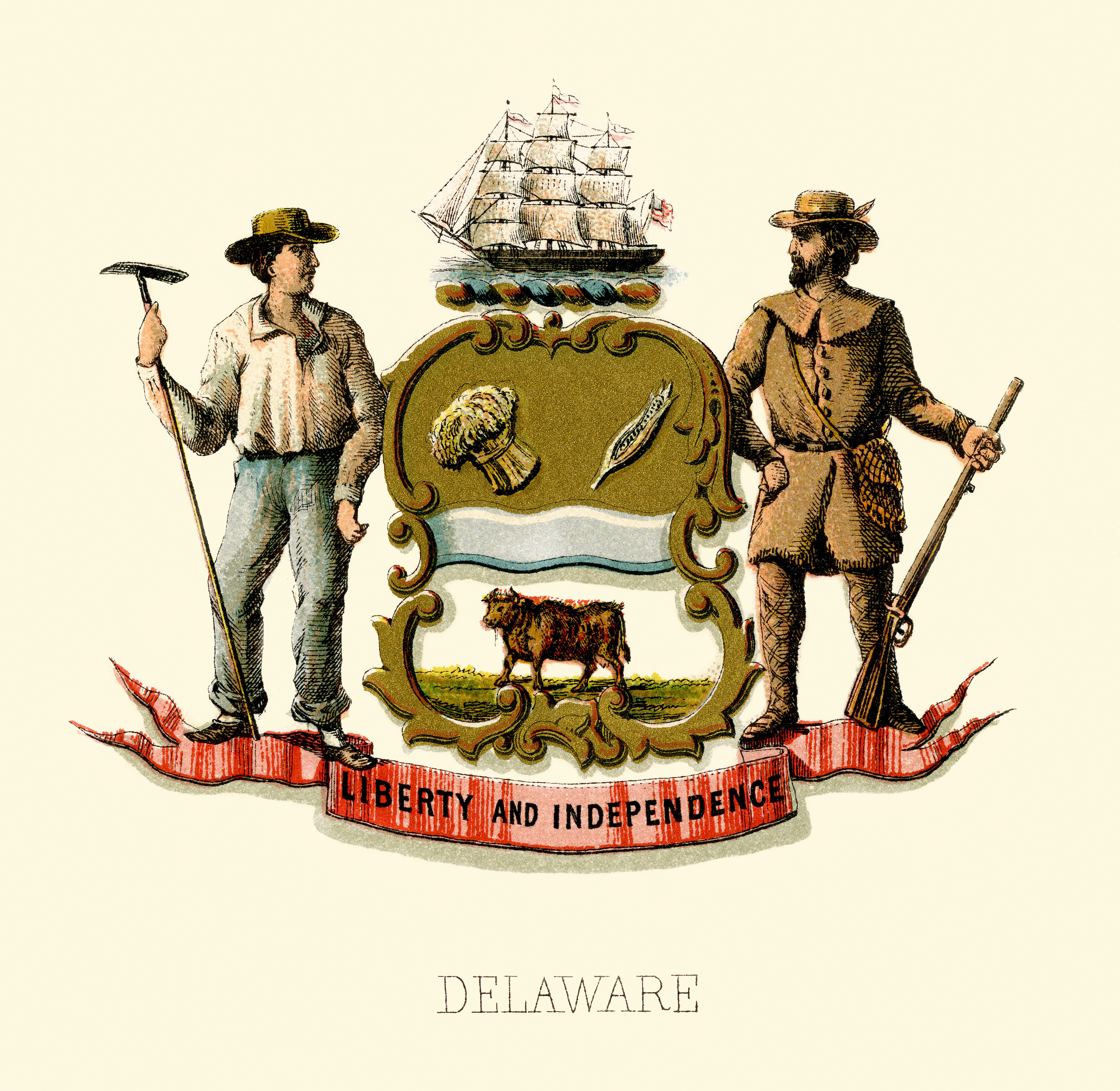
- Delaware coat of arms flown on the regimental flag
- Active: 12 July–12 August 1864
- Country: United States of America
- Allegiance: Union
- Branch: Union Army
- Role: Infantry
- Size: 33 officers and 945 men

The 7th Delaware Infantry Regiment was an infantry regiment of the Union Army in the American Civil War. Raised in response to the Confederate cavalry raid into Maryland in mid-1864, the regiment guarded railroad bridges and garrisoned the Baltimore defenses during its month of service.

== History ==
The 7th Delaware Infantry Regiment was organized at Wilmington, Delaware for 30 days emergency service on 12 July 1864, in response to Confederate cavalry commander Jubal Early's raid into Maryland and the Union defeat at the Battle of Monocacy, to guard the approaches to Wilmington. Recruiting for the regiment began on 11 July, when Delaware Governor William Cannon issued a proclamation calling for a thirty day regiment to protect the railroads at the request of Wallace. 300 volunteers were recruited from southern Delaware by Provost Marshal Edwin Wilmer who made impassioned speeches from a special train, urging able-bodied men to leave their work and return to Wilmington aboard the train.

The 7th Delaware was commanded by Lieutenant Colonel (later Colonel) Edgar Hounsfield, and numbered 33 officers and 945 men. The regimental major, Hugh Sterling, received his position due to his leadership in a skirmish at Gunpowder Ridge, and later formed Sterling's Infantry Company. It was attached to the 3rd Separate Brigade of VIII Corps in the Middle Department, guarding the Philadelphia, Wilmington and Baltimore Railroad at Havre de Grace and Oconowingo Bridge until 16 July, when it moved to Baltimore and took positions in the defenses of that city. Three men of the regiment died of disease before it returned to Wilmington on 11 August, where it mustered out at the end of its term on the next day. As it marched through the streets of Wilmington to Camp Smithers, the regiment was eagerly welcomed by the populace and the bell of the city hall was rung.

== See also ==
- List of Delaware Civil War units
- Delaware in the American Civil War
