= 1st Delaware Cavalry Battalion =

- Active: 20 January 1863–30 June 1865
- Country: United States of America
- Allegiance: Union
- Branch: Union Army
- Role: Cavalry
- Size: 568
- Engagements: American Civil War: Corbit's Charge

The 1st Delaware Cavalry Battalion was a cavalry regiment of the Union Army in the American Civil War. Raised in late 1862, the 1st Delaware Cavalry Battalion was initially to be raised as the 1st Delaware Cavalry Regiment, but was reduced to a battalion due to the inability of the state to fill a cavalry regiment to full strength. It served on provost duty in Maryland and Delaware from 1863 to early 1864, and fought in the action at Westminster known as Corbit's Charge during the Gettysburg campaign. It participated in the Overland Campaign in June 1864, then returned to Maryland after the Confederate cavalry raid of Jubal Early. It remained there for the remainder of the war, and was mustered out after its end.

== History ==
The first attempts to raise cavalry units for active service in Delaware were made by Napoleon Bonaparte Knight, who was authorized to raise a battalion of four companies on 13 August 1862. Delaware politician George P. Fisher was commissioned by the War Department to raise a 1,200-man cavalry regiment, including Knight's battalion, on 9 September. Due to the small population of the state, the regiment could not be expanded to the projected strength, with only seven understrength companies out of a typical ten being raised. It ultimately served as a four-company battalion. Between late 1862 and early 1863 it trained at Camp Smithers near Wilmington at Brandywine Hundred.

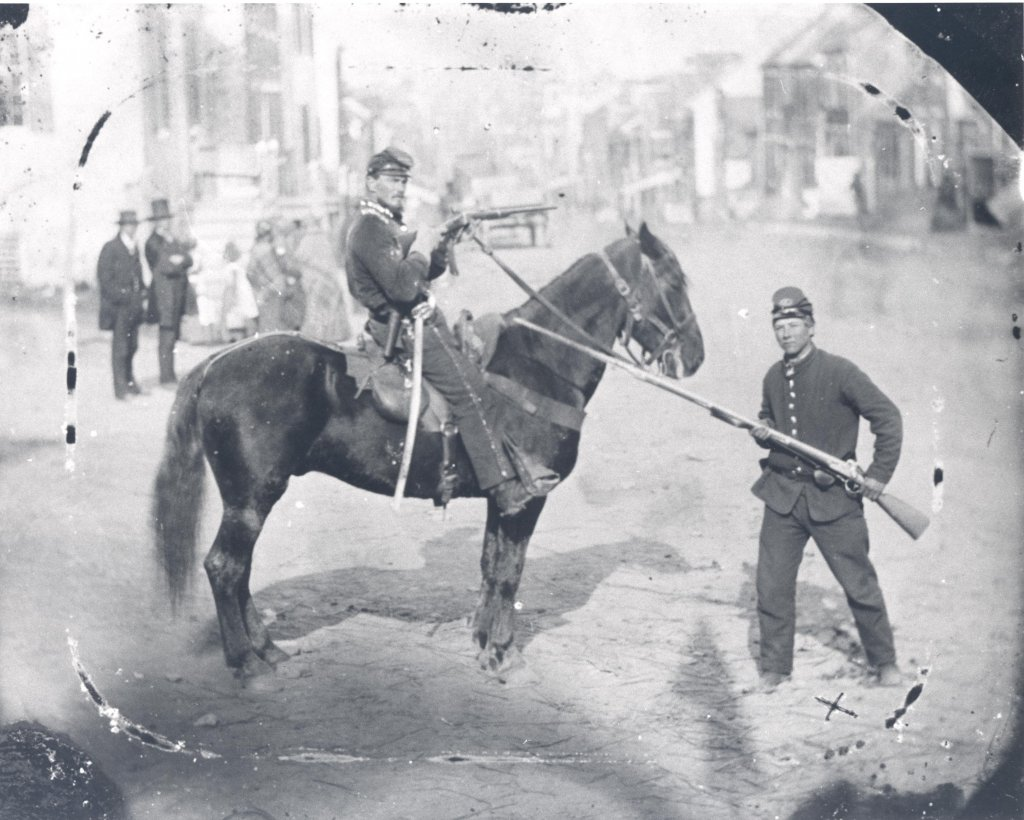
Knight (on horseback) in Westminster before Corbit's Charge

The regiment was organized at Wilmington on 20 January 1863, attached to the 1st Separate Brigade of VIII Corps in the Middle Department. It mustered in with a strength of 568, including 24 officers. The 1st Delaware Cavalry served at Wilmington until June, when it transferred to the Cavalry Reserve of the Defenses of Baltimore. The regiment was on provost duty in and near Baltimore for the next year, and elements of it fought in the action at Westminster (Corbit's Charge) on 28 June; this was its first combat. It was transferred to the 3rd Separate Brigade of the corps in October, and returned to the Cavalry Reserve in December. Companies A and D remained in the District of Delaware until December, while Companies D and E remained in that state until March 1864, after which Company E was stationed at Havre de Grace in April. The regiment transferred back to the 3rd Separate Brigade in March, and was ordered to join the Army of the Potomac to fight in the Overland Campaign on 15 May.

Upon reporting to the army on 5 June, the regiment was assigned to the 1st Brigade of the 1st Division of VI Corps. It fought in the Battle of Cold Harbor between 5 and 12 June and the Siege of Petersburg between 17 June and 10 July. During the latter, it participated in the Battle of Jerusalem Plank Road between 22 and 23 June and the First Battle of Ream's Station on 29 June. With VI Corps, the regiment moved north to Baltimore and Washington, D.C. in pursuit of Confederate cavalry commander Jubal Early between 10 and 12 July, guarding the corps Artillery Brigade. On 14 July the regiment, excluding Company A, was ordered to Baltimore, where it rejoined the 1st Separate Brigade of VIII Corps. Company A remained with the Army of the Potomac to guard the VI Corps Reserve Artillery until rejoining the regiment in September.

The regiment served on picket and outpost duty along the line of the Baltimore and Ohio Railroad, and guarded fords of the Potomac River between Georgetown and Point of Rocks until November, when it briefly returned to Delaware for the United States presidential election. Operating in Montgomery County between 7 and 11 October, the regiment continued to serve on the Upper Potomac and on the line of the Baltimore and Ohio. By March 1865, the regimental headquarters was at Monocacy Junction with detachments at Baltimore and Annapolis, among others. In mid-April its detachments helped in the search for the Booth conspirators, one of whom, George Atzerodt, was captured by a squad led by Sergeant Zachariah W. Gimmell on 20 April, and brought to the Relay House camp. The detachments at Relay House were mustered out on 6 June, followed by those at Baltimore on 30 June. During its service, the regiment lost two enlisted men killed in action, while two officers and 47 enlisted men died of disease. It mustered out with a strength of 363, including eleven officers.

== See also ==
- List of Delaware Civil War units
- Delaware in the American Civil War
