= Galvanized Yankees =

Confederate POWs who swore allegiance to the United States during the American Civil War

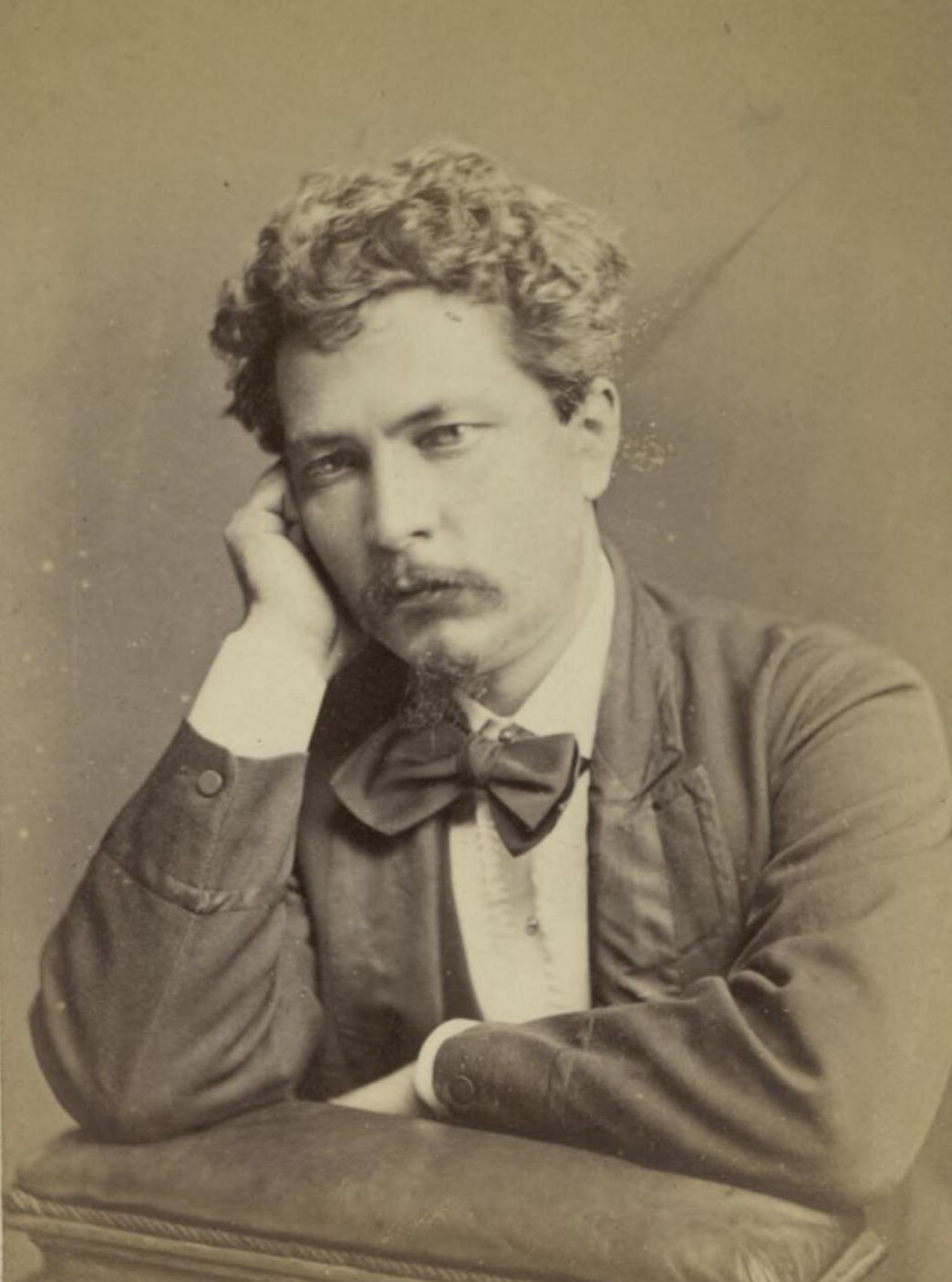
Henry Morton Stanley, who was one of the Galvanized Yankees

Galvanized Yankees was a term from the American Civil War denoting former Confederate prisoners of war who swore allegiance to the United States and joined the Union Army. Approximately 5,600 former Confederate soldiers enlisted in the United States Volunteers, organized into six regiments of infantry between January 1864 and November 1866. Of those, more than 250 had begun their service as Union soldiers, were captured in battle, then enlisted in prison to join a regiment of the Confederate States Army. They surrendered to Union forces in December 1864 and were held by the United States as deserters, but were saved from prosecution by being enlisted in the 5th and 6th U.S. Volunteers. An additional 800 former Confederates served in volunteer regiments raised by the states, forming ten companies. Four of those companies saw combat in the Western Theater against the Confederate Army, two served on the western frontier, and one became an independent company of U.S. Volunteers, serving in Minnesota.

The term "galvanized" has also been applied to former Union soldiers enlisting in the Confederate Army, including the use of "galvanized Yankees" to designate them. At least 1,600 former Union prisoners of war enlisted in Confederate service in late 1864 and early 1865, most of them recent German or Irish immigrants who had been drafted into Union regiments.

The practice of recruiting from prisoners of war began in 1862 at Camp Douglas at Chicago, Illinois, with attempts to enlist Confederate prisoners who expressed reluctance to exchange following their capture at Fort Donelson. Some 228 prisoners of mostly Irish extraction were enlisted by Col. James A. Mulligan before the War Department banned further recruitment March 15. (Note: Among the 228 was journalist Henry Morton Stanley.) The ban continued until 1863, except for a few enlistments of foreign-born Confederates into largely ethnic regiments.

Three factors led to a resurrection of the concept: an outbreak of the American Indian Wars by tribes in Minnesota and on the Great Plains; the disinclination of paroled but not exchanged Federal troops to be used to fight them; and protests of the Confederate government that any use of paroled troops in Indian warfare was a violation of the Dix–Hill prisoner of war cartel. (Note: The Lincoln Administration wished to avoid any legal wrangles over the prisoner cartel that might be construed as recognition of the Confederacy as a legitimate government.) In January 1863, following issuance of the Emancipation Proclamation, the United States began to actively recruit black soldiers. The following May, the Confederate Congress passed a joint resolution suspending exchange of black Union soldiers and their white officers, and ordering that they instead be put on trial and punished. On July 30, 1863, President Abraham Lincoln ordered suspension of exchanges of Confederate prisoners until the Confederacy agreed to treat black prisoners the same as white prisoners.

Gen. Gilman Marston, commandant of the huge prisoner of war camp at Point Lookout, Maryland, recommended that Confederate prisoners be enlisted in the U.S. Navy, which Secretary of War Edwin Stanton approved December 21. General Benjamin Butler's jurisdiction included Point Lookout, and he advised Stanton that more prisoners could be recruited for the Army than the Navy. The matter was then referred to President Lincoln, who gave verbal authorization on January 2, 1864, and formal authorization on March 5 to raise the 1st United States Volunteer Infantry for three years' service without restrictions as to use. On September 1, Lincoln approved 1,750 more Confederate recruits in order to bolster his election chances in Pennsylvania, enough to form two more regiments, to be sent to the frontier to fight American Indians. (Note: Pennsylvania was the home state of Lincoln's opponent General George B. McClellan, and the request was by a Pennsylvania delegation offering to pay the bounties in return for the state receiving the credit against its allocation.) The final two regiments of U.S. Volunteers were recruited in the spring of 1865 to replace the 2nd and 3rd U.S.V.I., which had been enlisted as one-year regiments.

Due to doubts about their ultimate loyalty, galvanized Yankees in federal service were generally assigned to garrison forts far from the Civil War battlefields or in action against Indians in the west. However, desertion rates among the units of galvanized Yankees were little different from those of state volunteer units in Federal service. (Note: Brown quotes the 1928 study by Ella Lonn Desertion During the Civil War which found that desertion rates among the state regiments was 13 percent, while that of the six U.S.V.I. regiments was 14 percent.) Galvanized troops of the U.S. Volunteers on the frontier served as far west as Camp Douglas, Utah; as far south as Fort Union, New Mexico; and as far north as Fort Benton, Montana. (Note: Three companies of the 6th U.S.V.I. were posted to Camp Douglas; Company H, 5th U.S.V.I. escorted a wagon train to Fort Union; and a detachment of 10 men of Company H, 1st U.S.V.I. under Lt. Cyrus L. Hutchins traveled by steamboat on May 12, 1865, to Fort Benton to control trade between there and another post at the mouth of the Yellowstone River. (Brown 1963, pp. 67, 91, 205).)

== Origin of term ==
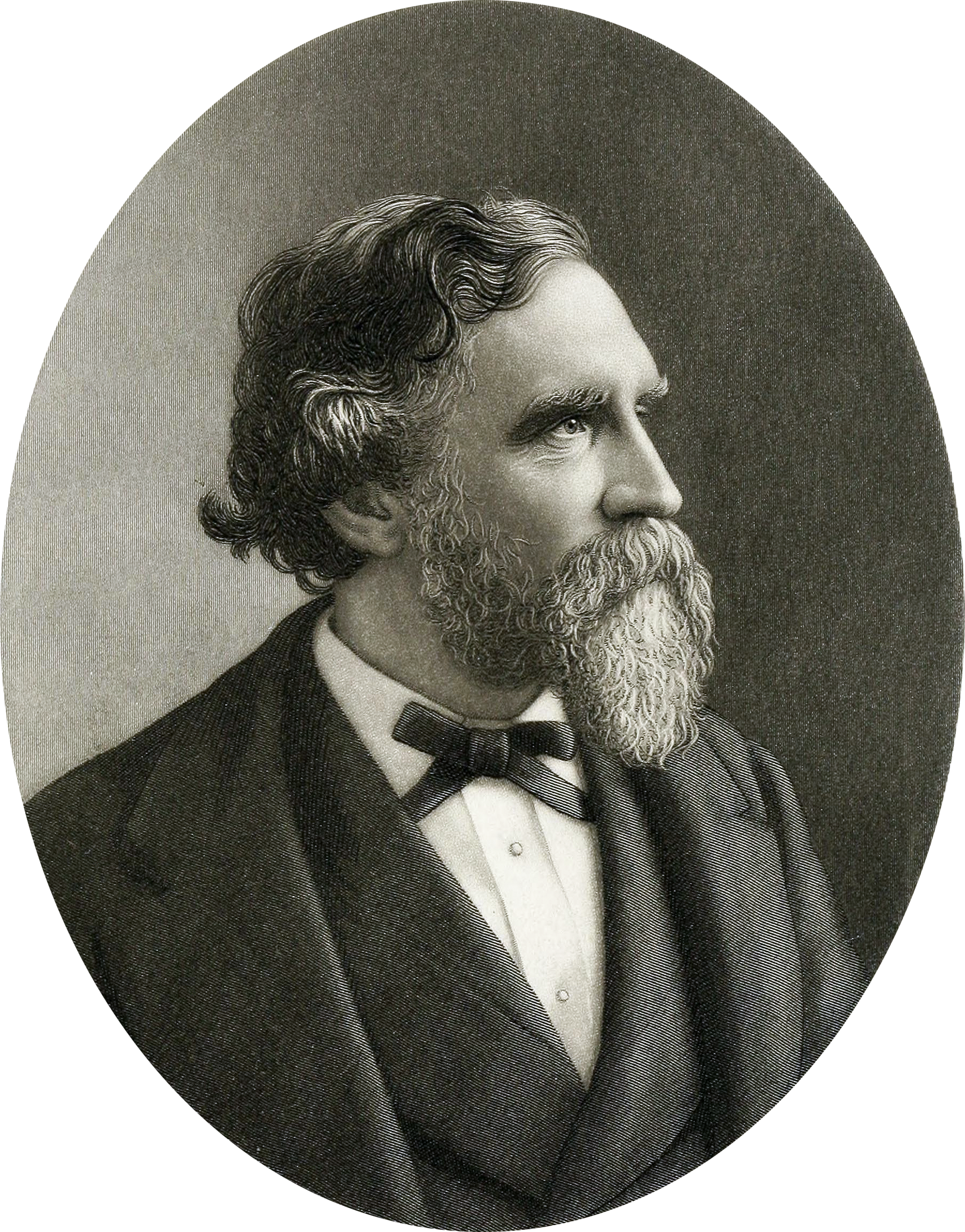
Samuel Bowles, who popularized the term

The National Park Service describes the origin of the expression "galvanized Yankee" in a bulletin published in 1992 for visitors to the Gateway Arch National Park (then known as the Jefferson National Expansion Memorial):

The term "galvanized" is most commonly associated with metal when it is coated with zinc to protect it from corrosion. In the process the surface color of the metal is altered, but underneath the coating the steel is unchanged. During the Civil War, in both Northern and Southern prison camps, soldiers sometimes decided to "galvanize," or change sides, to save themselves from the horrors of prison life. Like the metal, these galvanized soldiers in many cases were still "Good old Rebels," or "Billy Yanks," underneath their adopted uniforms.

The expression "galvanized Yankees" sprang up as a term of deprecation among Confederate prisoners for those who chose to enlist. At the same time, the use of "white-washed Rebels" as a reference came into being among Federal state regiments stationed on the frontier at the time when the 1st U.S.V.I. arrived. Dee Brown cites documentation from March and April 1865 indicating that the term was first used to characterize captured Federals who turned Confederate. The general use of "galvanized Yankees" originated in a story in the Springfield Republican (Springfield, Massachusetts) on May 25, 1865, by Samuel Bowles, who wrote:

Among the present limited number of troops on the Plain are two regiments of infantry, all from the rebel army. They have cheerfully re-enlisted into the federal service. They are known in the army as "white-washed rebs," or as they call themselves, "galvanized Yankees."

== Federal regiments composed of "galvanized Yankees" ==
=== United States Volunteers ===
Concise histories of all units of U.S. Volunteer Infantry are at Frederick H. Dyer's Compendium, p. 1717

1st U.S. Volunteer Infantry

The 1st U.S.V.I. (Note: Commanded by Col. Charles Augustus Ropes Dimon, 23-year-old protégé of Gen. Benjamin Butler. Dimon had served as a junior officer in a number of regiments, including the 2nd Louisiana Infantry, composed of former Confederates and Union loyalists. (Brown 1963 pp. 8, 77; Butts).) was recruited at Point Lookout prison camp between January 21 and April 22, 1864, as a three-year regiment. Assigned to the District of Eastern Virginia, Department of Virginia and North Carolina, it moved to Norfolk, Virginia, where on orders of General Grant it was relegated to provost duty there, Portsmouth, Virginia, and Elizabeth City, North Carolina. In August 1864, Grant ordered it to the Department of the Northwest in Milwaukee, Wisconsin. The 1st U.S.V.I. traveled by ship to New York City, (Note: The ship was the transport SS Continental, which in 1866 would carry the 100 "Mercer Belles" as brides to Seattle, Washington. (Brown 1963 p. 71).) and by train to Chicago, where it received further orders splitting the regiment. Four companies continued to Milwaukee, while six companies (B, C, D, E, H, and K) were sent to St. Louis, Missouri, arriving there August 22. They moved by the steamboat Effie Deans and by forced march to Fort Rice, Dakota Territory, arriving there October 17 for garrison duty. Conditions were hard over the winter, and fully 11% of the command died of illness, primarily scurvy. Between May 10 and August 31, 1865, Company K garrisoned Fort Berthold and Company B the trading post known as Fort Union at the mouth of the Yellowstone, obliged to travel by steamboat through hostile territory. (Note: The large side-wheeler Yellowstone and small stern-wheeler Big Horn made the respective trips.) Four companies were present at Fort Rice, along with two companies of the 4th U.S.V.I., when a large force of Lakota and Cheyenne (Note: Butts places the number at 500, Brown 1,000.) led by Sitting Bull attacked for three hours on July 28, 1865, making away with the entire horse herd and killing two soldiers. In October 1865, the battalion returned to St. Louis to muster out November 27.

The four companies continuing on to Wisconsin in August 1864 were ordered to the District of Minnesota. (Note: Companies A, F, G, and I were commanded by Lt.Col. William Tamblyn, and posted respectively at Fort Abercrombie, Fort Wadsworth, Fort Ripley, and Fort Ridgely.) Their muster out in July 1865 was canceled and in October, they were ordered to build and garrison Fort Fletcher, Kansas, and man two outposts at Monument Station and Ponds Creek Station, also in Kansas, to protect the new Butterfield Overland Despatch stagecoach route. Companies A, F, G, and I of the 1st U.S.V.I. mustered out at Fort Leavenworth on May 22, 1866, after 25 months of active service, the longest service of any of the "galvanized Yankees."

2nd U.S. Volunteer Infantry

Authorized in October 1864 at the Rock Island prisoner camp in Illinois as a one-year regiment, the 2nd U.S.V.I. (Note: Col. Andrew Patrick Caraher commanded the 2nd U.S. Volunteer Infantry. Born in Armagh, Ireland, he commanded the 28th Massachusetts at the Battle of Antietam as a captain. He was captured in 1863 as a lieutenant colonel of the Veteran Volunteer Corps and escaped from Libby Prison, then became assistant commandant at Rock Island. He was commissioned in the regular army after the war and became a captain in the 8th Cavalry. He died in Texas in 1885 of complications of being wounded at Fredericksburg in 1862.(Brown 1963, pp. 8, 45).) was not organized until February 1865. It was ordered to the Department of the Missouri and sent by rail to Fort Leavenworth, Kansas, where it was assigned to duty in the District of Upper Arkansas along the Santa Fe Trail from the Little Arkansas River to Fort Dodge, Kansas, and along the Cimarron Crossing to Fort Lyon, Colorado. From Fort Leavenworth the unit marched to Fort Riley, and stationed companies there and at Salem, Fort Ellsworth, Fort Larned, Fort Zarah and Fort Scott, Kansas. Companies F and G were involved in the establishment of Fort Dodge in the summer of 1865. Their duties involved scouting, wagon train escort and operating against Indians. Members of the regiment were present as guards at the signing of the Little Arkansas Treaty. The regiment mustered out at Fort Leavenworth November 7, 1865.

3rd U.S. Volunteer Infantry

The 3rd U.S.V.I. (Note: Col. Christopher H. McNally, born in England, was commissioned in the U.S. Mounted Rifles (later the 3rd Cavalry) in 1855 after serving seven years as an enlisted man. A captain in the 3rd Cavalry, he was captured on July 27, 1861, near Fort Fillmore, New Mexico, following the First Battle of Mesilla. McNally was paroled on the battlefield, then exchanged in August 1862, rejoining the 3rd Cavalry in April 1863 as Inspector of Horses. (Brown 1963, pp. 8, 21).) was authorized at the Rock Island prisoner camp in October 1864 as a one-year regiment but not organized until February 1865. It was ordered to the Department of the Missouri, arriving at Fort Kearny, Nebraska, April 9, 1865, (Note: The 3rd U.S.V.I. arrived at Fort Kearny on the date that Robert E. Lee surrendered the Army of Northern Virginia at Appomattox Court House.) where it was assigned to duty in the Districts of Nebraska and Colorado. Companies A and B were stationed at Fort Kearney; C and D at Cottonwood, Colorado; E and F at Fort Rankin; and G and H at Julesburg, Colorado, protecting overland mail routes from Indian attacks. Companies I and K were sent to Fort Laramie, and on May 15, 1865, were parceled out in small detachments along 300 miles of the Pacific Telegraph Company line from Laramie to South Pass, Territory of Idaho (now Wyoming). Company I was involved in numerous skirmishes, including combat at the Battle of the Platte Bridge Station, and suffered higher casualties than any other company of the 3rd U.S.V.I. The regiment mustered out November 29, 1865, having served with distinction, including a low desertion rate.

4th U.S. Volunteer Infantry

The 4th U.S.V.I. (Note: Lt. Col. Charles C.G. Thornton, formerly a captain with the 12th Maine in Louisiana, and on the staff of Brig. Gen. George F. Shepley, including a stint as lieutenant colonel of the 2nd U.S.V.I. (Brown 1963, pp. 8, 112).) was organized as a three-year regiment at Point Lookout on October 31, 1864, although only six companies could be induced to enlist. The quality of recruit was not as high as that of the earlier 1st U.S.V.I. The regiment waited at Portsmouth, Virginia, in hopes that more troops could be raised, but calls for men from the west led to its transfer to the frontier at the end of April 1865. 10% deserted before the regiment reached Sioux City, Iowa, in Department of the Northwest, on May 28. Many were arrested and held in confinement before returning to the ranks. Two companies were stationed at Fort Rice, then at Fort Sully; one at Fort Berthold; and three at Fort Randall until June 1866, when the six companies were recalled to Leavenworth, mustering out as they arrived between June 18 and July 2.

5th U.S. Volunteer Infantry

The 5th U.S.V.I. (Note: Col. Henry E. Maynadier, 1851 West Point graduate born at Fort Monroe, Virginia, former major of the 12th Infantry, brevetted major general. (Brown 1963, pp. 7–8, 120).) was enlisted at the Alton and Camp Douglas prisoner camps in Illinois in March and April 1865 as a three-year regiment, then ordered to Fort Leavenworth on April 28, 1865, at the urging of Maj. Gen. Grenville Dodge, commanding general of the Department of the Missouri. From there it moved to Fort Riley between May 18 and May 28 to relieve units of the 2nd U.S.V.I. in guarding the Santa Fe Trail. In August three companies were sent to Fort Halleck, Idaho Territory (now Wyoming); two companies to Camp Wardwell, Colorado; two companies to Fort Lyon, and Company B to Denver for quartermaster duty. Companies saw periodic duty at Fort McPherson, Nebraska; Fort Collins, Colorado; and Fort John Buford, Wyoming. Companies C and D, consisting mostly of former Union soldiers who had been captured after enlisting in the Confederate 10th Tennessee, escorted the Sawyers expedition to build a road to Montana and garrisoned Fort Reno for nearly a year. Companies A through G reassembled at Fort Kearny in August 1866 and mustered out on October 11. Companies H, I, and K garrisoned Fort Lyon until October 1866, when Gen. William T. Sherman closed the post for deplorable living conditions. They marched to Fort Leavenworth, where they mustered out on November 13, the last of the "galvanized Yankees". (Note: Company H, 5th U.S.V.I. was the most traveled of the "galvanized Yankee" units in its 20 months of service on the plains, operating in five districts and at every post in Colorado, Nebraska, and Kansas; and seeing considerable skirmishing. It was also the only unit to travel to New Mexico. It had one of the highest desertion rates, with only 30 of its original 97 men left to muster out, only two of the losses due to death. (Brown 1963 pp. 205–206).)

6th U.S. Volunteer Infantry

The 6th U.S.V.I. (Note: Col. Carroll H. Potter had failed to complete West Point in 1857, was appointed an assistant adjutant general of volunteers with the rank of captain in October 1861. He served on a number of staffs and was promoted to major in February 1865, then brevetted a brigadier general of volunteers for "meritorious service" in March. After mustering out of the 6th U.S.V.I. he received a regular commission as a 1st lieutenant in the 18th Infantry. (Brown 1963, pp. 8, 142–143).) was recruited from prisoner camps at Camp Chase, Ohio (two companies); Camp Morton, Indiana (two companies); and Camp Douglas, Illinois (six companies), as a three-year regiment, and assembled on April 2, 1865, at Camp Fry near Chicago for outfitting and drill. It traveled by rail to Fort Leavenworth, Kansas, on May 10–11, 1865, the only regiment of "galvanized Yankees" to arrive on the frontier intact and at full strength, 976 officers and men. Between May 14 and May 31, they marched to Fort Kearny, Nebraska, where it dispersed to replace the various companies of the 3rd U.S.V.I. guarding the telegraph line and the Oregon Trail. In August Gen. Patrick E. Connor ordered regimental headquarters and three companies to garrison Camp Douglas, Utah; and two companies west from Fort Rankin, Colorado, to replace the cavalry along the telegraph line west of Fort Laramie. 35 of the 275 men ordered to Utah deserted before their arrival October 9. The companies in Utah were relieved by regulars in April 1866 and marched to Fort Bridger. The other seven companies frequently changed stations, posted at some point to Camp Wardwell, Julesburg, and Fort Sedgwick, Colorado; Post Alkali, Fort Cottonwood, Mud Springs, Plum Creek, and Columbus, Nebraska; Fort Wallace, Kansas; and Fort Laramie, Fort Halleck, Fort Caspar, and Sweetwater Station, Territory of Idaho. In October 1866 all companies except Company B at Fort Wallace were relieved by regulars and assembled at Fort Kearny, where they mustered out between October 10 and 15. Company B marched across Kansas to Fort Leavenworth and mustered out on November 3. (Note: Company I of the 6th U.S.V.I. was commanded by the only officer commissioned from the ranks of the "galvanized Yankees," John T. Shanks, originally from Texas and a captain of Tennessee cavalry captured with Morgan's raiders. (Brown 1963 p. 162).)

1st Independent Company, U.S. Volunteers
See "1st Connecticut Cavalry" below

=== State volunteer units in Federal service ===
1st Connecticut Cavalry

The 1st Regiment Cavalry, Connecticut Volunteers was originally raised in November 1861 as the 1st Battalion Connecticut Cavalry, and campaigned in West Virginia, the Shenandoah Valley, and the Second Battle of Bull Run. In September 1863, authorized to expand to a regiment, the 1st Connecticut Cavalry while on Provost Guard at Camp Chesebrough in Baltimore, recruited 82 replacements from among Confederate prisoners kept at Fort Delaware, placing most in Company G (organized October 5, 1863) and spreading the rest throughout the regiment. In the spring of 1864 Gen. Grant directed that all units containing former Confederates would be employed on the western frontier. All of the former Confederates in the 1st Connecticut Cavalry were placed into Company G (Note: Company G, 1st Connecticut Cavalry was commanded by Capt. James R. Straut. (O.R. Vol. XLI, p. 997) Straut had enlisted as a sergeant in Company D in October 1861, became first sergeant of Company I in November 1863, reenlisted in December, became 2nd lieutenant of Company I in January 1864, then 1st Lt of Company G in March. He became captain of the company in Minnesota on December 3, 1864.) and on April 26, 1864, sent to Fort Snelling, Minnesota, also serving at Forts Ridgely and Ripley. On April 6, 1865, the remaining 40 former Confederates of the company transferred to the U.S. Volunteers and were designated the 1st Independent Company, U.S.V.. (Note: The first commander after the transfer was 1st Lt. Cyrus L. Hutchins, Worcester, Massachusetts, of the 1st U.S.V.I. (O.R. Vol. XLVIII, p. 264) He had been commissioned from the ranks while in Company A, 25th Massachusetts Volunteers. He returned to the 1st U.S.V.I. in May and led the small detachment dispatched from Fort Rice to Fort Benton, Montana.) The 1st Independent Company remained on duty in the District of Minnesota until mustered out on November 16, 1865.

3rd Maryland Cavalry

The service of the 3rd Regiment Cavalry, Maryland Volunteers began on August 8, 1863, with the raising of three companies at Baltimore. In September and October, Companies D, E, F, and G were recruited from Confederate prisoners at Fort Delaware, most of whom had been captured at the Battle of Gettysburg, numbering approximately 450 in all. The regiment remained in garrison at Camp Schenck in Baltimore, seeking to raise more troops, assigned to the Cavalry Reserve of the Eighth Corps until officially organized on January 9, 1864. Sent by steamship to New Orleans and Madisonville, Louisiana, the 3rd Maryland Cavalry took part in the Red River Campaign, in the Atchafalaya Expedition in the first week of June 1864, (Note: The "Atchafalaya Expedition," conducted by Lawler's Division of the Thirteenth Corps, had as its objective the securing of Morgan's Crossing over the Atchafalaya River in Louisiana, used by Confederate forces after the Red River Campaign. The 3rd Maryland Cavalry was assigned to a brigade of cavalry commanded by Col. Morgan H. Chrysler that was the advance guard for the division.) and in August was dismounted to participate in the siege of Fort Morgan. Disease seriously depleted the ranks of the regiment, and in December 1864, the 3rd Maryland Cavalry consolidated into a six-company battalion. Company D became part of Company E, and Company G part of Company F, participating in the campaign to capture Mobile, Alabama in March and April 1865. The 3rd Maryland Cavalry was the only unit of "galvanized Yankees" in Federal service to actively campaign against Confederate forces. At the end of hostilities it was assigned to the Department of Mississippi and garrisoned Natchez, Mississippi, through the summer of 1865. The battalion mustered out at Vicksburg on September 7, 1865. (Note: The four companies from Fort Delaware were recruited by regimental commander Lt. Col. Charles Carroll Tevis, who as lieutenant colonel of the 4th Delaware Infantry was reputed by Speer to have earlier recruited "galvanized Yankees" into Company C. An 1839 graduate of West Point, Tevis was a cadet under the name "Washington Carrol Tevis", served as a lieutenant in the Mounted Rifles, left the service but was appointed to the 4th Delaware in April 1862, then transferred in rank to organize the new 3rd Maryland Cavalry on September 25, 1863. Tevis accompanied the 3rd to Louisiana, but resigned at some point during 1864. (Speer 1997 p. 220; Simmons, "Union Volunteers").)

3rd Pennsylvania Heavy Artillery

Battery M, 3rd Regiment Heavy Artillery, Pennsylvania Volunteers (Note: Capt. Francis H. Reichard commanded Battery M.) was raised in Philadelphia, then recruited prisoners at Fort Delaware in July and August 1863 to fill out its ranks. It was apparently over-recruited in numbers. The battery moved to Fortress Monroe to train, where some members were induced to join the newly created 188th Pennsylvania Volunteer Infantry.

4th Delaware Infantry

Company C of the 4th Regiment Infantry, Delaware Volunteers is claimed to have been recruited in 1862 or 1863 from prisoners at Fort Delaware, but claims have not been substantiated through checks of muster rolls.

11th Ohio Cavalry

The 11th Regiment Cavalry, Ohio Volunteers was originally raised as four companies of the 7th Ohio Cavalry in October 1861. It was sent west for duty on the Indian frontier in February 1862 to resolve a political dispute after its commander refused to consolidate with the 6th Ohio Cavalry. Permanently detached and given the designation 1st Independent Battalion Ohio Cavalry, it arrived at Fort Laramie on May 30, 1862. Four additional companies were recruited between June 26 and July 31, 1863, including approximately 40 Confederate prisoners from Camp Chase who became members of Company E. Originally called to service to repel John Hunt Morgan's raid through Ohio, the companies were also sent west to combine with the 1st Independent Battalion into the new 11th Ohio Volunteer Cavalry. They left Camp Dennison August 1 for Fort Leavenworth, reporting for duty August 13. While awaiting supplies, the battalion joined in pursuit of Quantrill's Raiders following the Lawrence Massacre. After marching 150 miles, they were recalled and marched to Fort Laramie between September 2 and October 10. En route, four of Company E's recruits plotted to involve all Confederates in the company in a mutiny when it reached Julesburg, but were disarmed and arrested before the attempt could be made. (Note: Sentenced by court martial to hard labor, three of the four were summarily executed in 1865 when they tried a second attempt. (Brown 1863 p. 183).) In July and August 1864, Capt. Henry E. Palmer was assigned to deliver a detachment of 60 recruits, all former members of Morgan's cavalry force, from Camp Chase to Fort Kearny, where they became Company K of the 11th Ohio Volunteer Cavalry. In August and September 1865 "galvanized" Companies E and K accompanied Connor's Powder River Expedition. Both companies returned to Fort Laramie, where they continued guard duties along the stage and telegraph lines until mustering out on July 14, 1866.

Ahl's Battery

see Ahl's Heavy Artillery Company

== Confederate forces composed of "galvanized Yankees" ==
Confederate recruitment of Union prisoners of war was authorized by Confederate Secretary of War James A. Seddon on September 30, 1864, after inquires from Gen. Braxton Bragg to recruit foreign-born prisoners. Seddon had as early as March 1863 granted discretionary permission to commanders including Gen. John C. Pemberton to recruit prisoners, but few if any, were actually enlisted. A concerted recruiting effort began on October 12 and continued to the end of the war. At least four Confederate units were recruited, including three units of Regulars in the Provisional Army of the Confederate States.

=== Confederate regulars ===
Brooks' Battalion, Confederate Regular Infantry (Note: Commanded by Lt. Col. John Hampden Brooks (formerly captain, 7th South Carolina Infantry).)
Recruited from prisoners held at the stockade in Florence, South Carolina, the unit was organized October 10, 1864, as "Brooks' Battalion of Foreigners," saw brief front-line service in McLaws Division until December 18, 1864, then was returned to Florence because of desertions and mutiny.
Tucker's Confederate Regiment (Note: Commanded by Col. Julius G. Tucker (formerly captain, 10th Virginia Cavalry).)
Recruited from prisons at Florence, South Carolina; Salisbury, North Carolina; and Richmond, Virginia, the unit organized October 16, 1864, as the "1st Foreign Battalion," was later increased to regimental size and renamed "1st Foreign Legion," then was re-designated February 28, 1865, as Tucker's Confederate Regiment. It had 72 men serving as pioneer troops at the surrender April 26, 1865.
8th Confederate Battalion (Note: Commanded by Lt. Col. Garrett Andrews, Jr., formerly a major on the staff of Maj. Gen. Arnold Elzey. Andrews raised the battalion himself from foreigners among the Union POWs.)
Recruited at Florence, South Carolina, the unit organized December 26, 1864, as the "2nd Foreign Battalion," later known as "2nd Foreign Legion", and was re-designated February 13, 1865, as 8th Confederate Battalion.

=== State volunteer regiments in Confederate service ===
10th Tennessee

In October 1864, John G. O'Neill, colonel of the 10th Tennessee Regiment (Irish Volunteers), (Note: The 10th Tennessee Regiment ("Sons of Erin") was organized at Fort Henry in May 1861 from Irish militia companies raised in Nashville, Clarksville, Pulaski, McEwen and their surrounding counties in central Tennessee. The 10th, the 2nd Tennessee, and the 6th Louisiana Volunteers were the three predominantly Irish regiments in the Confederate Army. The 10th's regimental flag was Kelly green, had a gold Irish harp in the center of the field, and was made by the Ladies Soldiers' Friend Society of Nashville, a group that included the widow of former U.S. President James K. Polk. Mustered into CSA service on September 1, 1861, its 720 soldiers wore gray caps, jackets, and pants with scarlet trim furnished by its wealthy lieutenant colonel, attorney and former mayor of Nashville Randal William McGavock, and were initially armed with flintlock muskets. The 10th Tennessee saw action at Fort Donelson, where the regiment surrendered and was held at Camp Douglas, Illinois until September 24, 1862, when it was exchanged at Vicksburg and reorganized with 383 troops. The 10th Tennessee returned to combat at the Battle of Raymond, and participated in the battles of Chickamauga, Missionary Ridge, the Atlanta campaign and Franklin. Major John G. ("Gentleman Johnny") O'Neill, an Irish immigrant, led the 10th Tennessee's sharpshooter detachment after initially commanding Company A. He became the fourth and last colonel of the 10th Tennessee in September 1864, succeeding Adolphus Heiman, McGavock, and William "Battling Billy" Grace, all deceased.) was authorized to recruit Union prisoners at Andersonville and Millen, Georgia, to replenish the depleted ranks of the regiment. (Note: Many if not most of the original 228 Confederate prisoners recruited at Camp Douglas in early 1862 to the Union side were likely from the 10th Tennessee, and this may have been the origin of O'Neill's request to recruit from Union prisoners.) O'Neill, recovering from wounds received at the Battle of Resaca, appears to have delegated part of the task to a newly appointed lieutenant colonel, Michael Burke. (Note: Burke, born in Galway, Ireland, had been a merchant in St. Louis when he enlisted in the Confederate 1st Missouri Infantry in June 1861. He saw action at Shiloh and Corinth, serving with the 1st Missouri until August 1864, when he was posted as a major to the staff of Maj. Gen. John B. Hood, where he was serving when Maj. Gen. Pierre G. T. Beauregard assigned him to the 10th Tennessee in September 1864.) In October and November 1864 O'Neill and Burke enlisted more than 250 soldiers of a number of Union regiments. Efforts were made at first to recruit Irish immigrants in compliance with Seddon's original instructions, but when few complied, native-born Union soldiers were enlisted. The recruits were required to take an oath of allegiance to the Confederacy, and were not issued arms or ammunition until the night before their first engagement.

Held under strict camp guard, they were sent to Mobile, Alabama while the 10th Tennessee itself advanced to the Battle of Franklin. Organized as Burke's Battalion, 10th Tennessee, they were made part of an ad hoc defense force assembled by Lt. Col. William W. Wier and sent by train towards Tupelo, Mississippi, to repel a raid along the Mobile and Ohio Railroad by two brigades of Union cavalry under the command of Brig. Gen. Benjamin Grierson. The Union cavalry force had already captured a substantial number of Brig. Gen. Nathan Bedford Forrest's dismounted cavalry encamped at Verona on Christmas Day. Burke's Battalion and the 17th Arkansas were sent with a battery of artillery aboard the first train to block the tracks at Egypt Station, a mile west of Aberdeen, Mississippi.

On the evening of December 27, 1864, six members of Burke's Battalion deserted and made their way into the Union lines, where they reported the presence of the former prisoners and the likelihood that they would not resist any Union attack. The next morning Grierson's 1st Brigade advanced and came under fire from Confederate skirmishers, including Burke's Battalion, which was ensconced in a stockade east of the rail line. After suffering a number of casualties, the 2nd New Jersey Cavalry responded with a charge in which it took severe casualties, including 22 dead, and lost 80 horses but captured more than 500 prisoners, among whom were Burke and 254 former Union soldiers from Burke's Battalion of the 10th Tennessee.

Grierson's prisoners were shipped by steamer to the Union prison camp at Alton, Illinois, where the claims of the "galvanized Yankees" that they desired restoration to their original units were investigated. Major General Dodge recommended on March 5, 1865, that all the former Union soldiers as well as a number of Confederate troops be enlisted in the U.S. Volunteers for service in the West. The recommendation for clemency was resisted by the Judge Advocate General's Office in Washington, D.C., which advocated that the former Union soldiers be tried for desertion, citing testimony from Union officers at Egypt Station that they resisted at the battle until their ammunition was exhausted. Dodge's recommendation was accepted, however, and the prisoners were permitted to enlist in the 5th and 6th U.S. Volunteers. (Note: The bulk of Companies C and D of the 5th U.S.V.I., which also included 69 former Confederate soldiers in their ranks, came from the troops captured at Egypt Station. The two companies marched to Fort Reno on the Powder River, Wyoming in August 1865, suffering 22 desertions en route. They finished construction of the fort, under virtual siege by Indians, and wintered at Fort Reno before being relieved by Col. Henry B. Carrington and the 18th Infantry on June 29, 1866. 104 were left, the rest having deserted or died of illness. Companies C and D rejoined the main body of the 5th U.S.V.I. at Fort Kearney and were mustered out of service on October 11. (Brown 1963, pp. 122–136).)

O'Neill returned to Andersonville and recruited 150 more prisoners for the 10th Tennessee in January 1865, and approximately 165 more in March.

== See also ==
- Scalawag
- List of United States Volunteer Civil War units

In cinema:

- Major Dundee
- Two Flags West

== Notes ==
Footnotes

Citations
