= List of Delaware units in the American Civil War =

Delaware, a border state, supplied 12,190 soldiers to the Union army during the American Civil War. A small number of men from Delaware served in the Confederate States Army in Maryland and Virginia Regiments, but there was no standalone Confederate regiment or battalion composed of Delaware troops.

== Infantry ==
- 1st Delaware Infantry Regiment
- 2nd Delaware Infantry Regiment
- 3rd Delaware Infantry Regiment
- 4th Delaware Infantry Regiment
- 5th Delaware Infantry Regiment
- 6th Delaware Infantry Regiment
- 7th Delaware Infantry Regiment
- 8th Delaware Infantry Regiment
- 9th Delaware Infantry Regiment
- Sterling's Infantry Company

== Cavalry ==
- 1st Delaware Cavalry Regiment
- Milligan's Independent Cavalry Company

== Artillery ==
- 1st (Nields' Independent) Battery, Light Artillery
- Ahl's Heavy Artillery Company

== See also ==
- Lists of American Civil War Regiments by State
- Delaware in the American Civil War
