= 9th Delaware Infantry Regiment =

- Active: August 30, 1864–January 23, 1865
- Disbanded: January 23, 1865
- Country: United States
- Allegiance: Union
- Branch: Infantry
- Role: Guard duty
- Size: Regiment
- Garrison/HQ: Fort Delaware
- Engagements: American Civil War

The 9th Delaware Infantry Regiment was an infantry regiment that served in the Union Army between August 30, 1864 and January 23, 1865, during the American Civil War.

== Service ==
The 9th Delaware Infantry Regiment was organized at Wilmington, Delaware, for a hundred-day service on August 30, 1864. Straight away it was assigned guard duty at Fort Delaware to guard prisoners. On January 23, 1865, it was mustered out. During its service the regiment lost eleven to disease.

== See also ==
- List of Delaware Civil War units
- Delaware in the American Civil War

== Bibliography ==
- Dyer, Frederick H. (1959). A Compendium of the War of the Rebellion. New York and London. Thomas Yoseloff, Publisher. LCCN 59-12963.
