= 5th Delaware Infantry Regiment =

- Active: October 25, 1862 - August 12, 1863
- Country: United States
- Allegiance: Union
- Branch: Infantry

The 5th Delaware Infantry Regiment was an infantry regiment in the Union Army during the American Civil War.

== Service ==
The 5th Delaware Infantry Regiment was organized October 25, 1862 and mustered on November 26, 1862.

The regiment was attached to District of Delaware, VIII Corps, Middle Department, to July 1863. 2nd Separate Brigade, VIII Corps, Middle Department, to August.

The 5th Delaware Infantry mustered out of service August 12, 1863.

== Detailed service ==
Duty in Delaware and as garrison at Fort Delaware, and guard duty on line of the Philadelphia, Wilmington & Baltimore Railroad from Perryville to Baltimore, until August 1863.

== Casualties ==
The regiment lost a total of 3 enlisted men during service, all due to disease.

== Notable members ==
- Captain Lammot du Pont I, Company B - chemist and a key member of the du Pont family and its company

== See also ==
- List of Delaware Civil War units
- Delaware in the Civil War
