= Ahl's Heavy Artillery Company =

Ahl's Independent Company, Heavy Artillery (officially known as the 1st Delaware Heavy Artillery) was a heavy artillery battery that served in the Union army in the American Civil War. The company was mainly composed of former Confederate prisoners of war who had sworn allegiance to the Union (over 200 so-called "galvanized Yankees").

The company (Delaware's only heavy artillery company during the war) was organized at Fort Delaware on July 27, 1863, not long after the Battle of Gettysburg. The company was assigned to garrison and guard duty at Fort Delaware during their entire period of service. Its commander was Capt. George W. Ahl, and nearly all the officers had come to the fort with Independent Battery G, Pittsburgh Heavy Artillery. The company mustered out on July 25, 1865.

== See also ==
- List of Delaware Civil War units
- Delaware in the American Civil War
