= 8th Delaware Infantry Regiment =

- Active: October 1864 - June 5, 1865
- Country: United States
- Allegiance: Union
- Branch: Infantry
- Engagements: Appomattox Campaign; Battle of Lewis's Farm; Battle of White Oak Road; Battle of Five Forks; Third Battle of Petersburg; Battle of Appomattox Court House

The 8th Delaware Infantry Regiment was an infantry regiment in the Union Army during the American Civil War.

== Service ==
The 8th Delaware Infantry Regiment was organized at Wilmington, Delaware in October 1864 and mustered in for one year's service.

The regiment was attached to Engineer Brigade, Army of the Potomac, to January 12, 1865. Provost Guard, Army of the Potomac, to March 1865. 3rd Brigade, 2nd Division, V Corps, Army of the Potomac, to June 1865.

The 8th Delaware Infantry mustered out of service June 5, 1865.

== Detailed service ==
Ordered to City Point, Virginia, reporting there October 13, 1864. Duty in the defenses of City Point, and provost duty at General Army Headquarters until March 16, 1865. Joined V Corps March 18. Appomattox Campaign March 28-April 9. Lewis Farm, near Gravelly Run, March 29. White Oak Ridge March 31. Five Forks April 1. Fall of Petersburg April 2. Pursuit of Lee April 3–9. Appomattox Court House April 9. Surrender of Lee and his army. Moved to Washington, D.C., May 2–12. Grand Review of the Armies May 23.

== Casualties ==
The regiment lost a total of 13 men during service; 3 enlisted men killed or mortally wounded, 10 enlisted men died of disease.

== See also ==
- List of Delaware Civil War units
- Delaware in the Civil War
