= 2nd Delaware Infantry Regiment =

American Civil War Union Army infantry regiment

- Active: June 12, 1861 - July 1, 1864
- Country: United States
- Allegiance: Union
- Branch: United States Army; Union Army
- Type: Infantry
- Part of: 3rd Brigade – 1st Division – II Corps – Army of the Potomac; 4th Brigade – 1st Division – II Corps; 3rd Brigade – 2nd Division – II Corps
- Engagements: Seven Days Battles; Battle of Antietam; Battle of Fredericksburg; Burnside's Mud March; Battle of Chancellorsville; Battle of Gettysburg; Bristoe Campaign; Mine Run Campaign; Battle of the Wilderness; Battle of Spotsylvania Court House; Battle of Cold Harbor; Siege of Petersburg; Second Battle of Petersburg; Battle of Jerusalem Plank Road; Second Battle of Deep Bottom (2 companies)

The 2nd Delaware Infantry Regiment was an infantry regiment in the Union Army during the American Civil War.

== Service ==
The 2nd Delaware Infantry was organized at Wilmington, Delaware from June 12 through October 7, 1861, and mustered in October 17, 1861, for three years' service under the command of Colonel W. Henry Wharton. Companies B, D, and G were recruited in Philadelphia, Pennsylvania; Company C was recruited in Elkton, Maryland.

The regiment was attached to Dix's Command until June 1862. 3rd Brigade, 1st Division, II Corps, Army of the Potomac, to April 1863. 4th Brigade, 1st Division, II Corps, to June 1864. 3rd Brigade, 2nd Division, II Corps, to July 1864.

The 2nd Delaware Infantry mustered out of service July 1, 1864. Veterans and recruits were transferred to the 1st Delaware Infantry Regiment.

== Detailed service ==
Moved to Baltimore, Maryland, October 1861. Duty at Baltimore, until June 1862. Expedition through Accomac County November 14–22, 1861. Ordered to join the Army of the Potomac, on the Peninsula, Virginia, June 1862. Seven Days before Richmond June 25-July 1. Savage Station June 27. Battle of Gaines Mill June 27. Peach Orchard and Savage Station June 29. White Oak Swamp and Glendale June 30. Malvern Hill July 1. At Harrison's Landing to August 16. Movement to Fortress Monroe, then Centreville, August 16–30. Covered Pope's retreat from Bull Run August 31-September 2. Maryland Campaign September 6–22. Sharpsburg September 15. Battle of Antietam September 16–17. Moved to Harpers Ferry September 22, and duty there until October 30. Reconnaissance to Charlestown October 16–17. Advance up Loudon Valley and movement to Falmouth, Virginia, October 30-November 17. Battle of Fredericksburg, December 12–15. At Falmouth, Virginia, until April 27, 1863. "Mud March" January 20–24. Chancellorsville Campaign April 27-May 6. Battle of Chancellorsville May 1–5. Gettysburg Campaign June 11-July 24. Battle of Gettysburg July 1–3. Pursuit of Lee to Manassas Gap, Virginia, July 5–24. Duty on line of the Rappahannock and Rapidan until October. Advance from line of the Rappahannock to the Rapidan September 13–17. Bristoe Campaign October 9–22. Auburn and Bristoe October 14. Advance to line of the Rappahannock November 7–8. Mine Run Campaign November 26-December 2. New Hope Church November 29. Mine Run November 28–30. At and near Stevensburg until May 1864. Demonstration on the Rapidan February 6–7. Campaign from the Rapidan to the James May 3-June 15. Battles of the Wilderness May 5–7. Spotsylvania May 8–12. Po River May 10. Spotsylvania Court House May 12–21. Assault on the Salient "Bloody Angle" May 12. North Anna River May 23–26. On line of the Pamunkey May 26–28. Totopotomoy May 28–31. Cold Harbor June 1–12. Before Petersburg June 16-July 1. Jerusalem Plank Road, Weldon Railroad, June 22–23.

== Casualties ==
The regiment lost a total of 201 men during service; 6 officers and 93 enlisted men killed or mortally wounded, 1 officer and 101 enlisted men died of disease.

== Commanders ==
- Colonel W. Henry Wharton - resigned due to illness
- Colonel William P. Baily - wounded in action at the Battle of Gettysburg, July 2; resigned May 16, 1864, following the Battle of Spotsylvania Court House
- Lieutenant Colonel David L. Stricker - commanded at the Battle of Antietam while still a captain; commanded at the Battle of Chancellorsville; commanded until wounded in action at the Battle of Gettysburg, July 2, after Col Baily; killed in action at the "Mule Shoe" at the Battle of Spotsylvania Court House
- Lieutenant Colonel Peter McCullough
- Captain Charles H. Christman - commanded at the Battle of Gettysburg after Col Baily and Lt Col Strickler left the field

== See also ==
- List of Delaware Civil War units
- Delaware in the Civil War
