= Corbit's Charge =

1863 skirmish in the American Civil War

Coordinates: 39°34′0″N 76°59′14″W

Corbit's Charge was a skirmish fought on June 29, 1863, in Westminster, Maryland, during the American Civil War between the cavalry commanded by Confederate General J.E.B. Stuart and two companies of the 1st Delaware Cavalry shortly before the Battle of Gettysburg. The skirmish, also known as the Battle of Westminster, is thought to have contributed to the delay of Stuart's arrival in Gettysburg and subsequently contributed to the defeat of Confederate forces there.

== Background ==
Stuart's three brigades of cavalry, after crossing the Potomac River and threatening Washington, D.C., proceeded north toward Pennsylvania, east of the main Confederate army and pursuing Union forces, following loose instructions from Confederate Commander Robert E. Lee. Meanwhile, Companies C and D of the 1st Delaware Cavalry were sent from Baltimore to Westminster to guard the Western Maryland Railway junction and arrived the day before the battle.

== Battle ==
The Delaware cavalry companies, totaling less than 100 men and commanded by Major Napoleon B. Knight, had arrived unaware of Stuart's impending approach, bivouacked near the northwestern end of town and found the town quiet. The next day, some of the Union troopers decided to have their horses reshod at a stable near the southern end of town. While there, the first Confederate cavalry arrived at the southern end of Westminster and captured those troopers.

Major Knight was absent then, so Captain Charles Corbit, one of the company commanders, rallied the remaining troopers and led a cavalry charge down Main Street in Westminster towards Stuart's cavalry, meeting them at the intersection with Washington Road. They were quickly defeated by the Confederates, and Captain Corbit, along with the other company commander, Lieutenant Caleb Churchman, were captured, along with more than half of the other Union troopers. Two were killed and 11 wounded. Two Confederate officers were killed and ten more troopers were wounded. One of the Confederate officers, Lt. John William Murray, Co. E, 4th Virginia cavalry, remains buried in the graveyard of Ascension Episcopal Church.

== Aftermath ==
The battle prompted Stuart's cavalry to stay the night in Westminster, delaying his arrival at Gettysburg and depriving Gen. Lee of important intelligence about Union troop movements and leading him to commit to fighting at Gettysburg.

== Commemoration ==
In 2003 the City of Westminster began holding the Commemoration of Corbit's Charge during the last full weekend of June, which has grown into a festival including Civil War re-enactors, demonstrations, museum tours, musical concerts and more.
