= 3rd Delaware Infantry Regiment =

- Active: December 30, 1861 - June 3, 1865
- Country: United States
- Allegiance: Union
- Branch: Infantry
- Engagements: Battle of South Mountain; Battle of Antietam; Battle of Cold Harbor; Siege of Petersburg; First Battle of Petersburg; Second Battle of Petersburg; Battle of Globe Tavern; Battle of Boydton Plank Road; Battle of Hatcher's Run; Appomattox Campaign; Battle of Five Forks; Battle of Appomattox Court House

The 3rd Delaware Infantry Regiment was an infantry regiment in the Union Army during the American Civil War.

== Service ==
The 3rd Delaware Infantry Regiment was organized at Camden, Delaware beginning December 30, 1861 and mustered in May 15, 1862 for three years of service.

The regiment was attached to Slough's Brigade, Defenses of Washington, D.C., May 1862. Slough's 2nd Brigade, Sigel's Division, Department of the Shenandoah, to June 1862. 2nd Brigade, 2nd Division, II Corps, Army of Virginia, to August 1862. 3rd Brigade, 2nd Division, II Corps, Army of Virginia, to September 1862. 3rd Brigade, 2nd Division, XII Corps, Army of the Potomac, to October 1862. Defenses of Baltimore, Maryland, VIII Corps, Middle Department, to January 1863. 3rd Separate Brigade, VIII Corps, to October 1864. 1st Separate Brigade, VIII Corps, to May 1864. 2nd Brigade, 4th Division, V Corps, Army of the Potomac, to August 1864. 3rd Brigade, 2nd Division, V Corps, to June 1865.

The 3rd Delaware Infantry mustered out of service June 3, 1865.

== Detailed service ==
Ordered to Washington, D.C., May, 1862. Defense of Harpers Ferry, May 28–30, 1862. Operations in the Shenandoah Valley until August. Battle of Cedar Mountain August 9. Pope's Campaign in northern Virginia August 16-September 2. Sulphur Springs August 23–24. Groveton August 29. Bull Run August 30. Sulphur Springs August 30. Chantilly September 1. Maryland Campaign September 6–22. Battle of South Mountain September 14. Battle of Antietam, September 16–17. Duty at Frederick, Maryland, Relay House, Md., and Elysville, Md., guarding railroad, and garrison duty in the Middle Department until May 1864. Ordered to join the Army of the Potomac in the field May 1864. Rapidan Campaign May 29-June 15. Totopotomoy May 29–31. Cold Harbor June 1–3. Before Petersburg June 16–18. Siege of Petersburg June 16, 1864 to April 2, 1865. Mine Explosion, Petersburg, July 30, 1864 (reserve). Weldon Railroad August 18–21. Poplar Springs Church September 29-October 2. Boydton Plank Road, Hatcher's Run, October 27–28. Warren's Raid on Weldon Railroad December 7–12. Dabney's Mills, Hatcher's Run, February 5–7, 1865. Appomattox Campaign March 28-April 9. Lewis Farm, near Gravelly Run, March 29. Boydton and White Oak Roads March 30–31. Five Forks April 1. Fall of Petersburg April 2. Pursuit of Lee April 3–9. Appomattox Court House April 9. Surrender of Lee and his army. March to Washington, D.C., May 1–12. Grand Review of the Armies May 23.

== Casualties ==
The regiment lost a total of 135 men during service; 7 officers and 46 enlisted men killed or mortally wounded, 2 officers and 80 enlisted men died of disease.

== Commanders ==
- Colonel William Redden
- Colonel Arthur Maginnis

== See also ==
- List of Delaware Civil War units
- Delaware in the Civil War
