= Washington Carroll Tevis =

American-born soldier of fortune

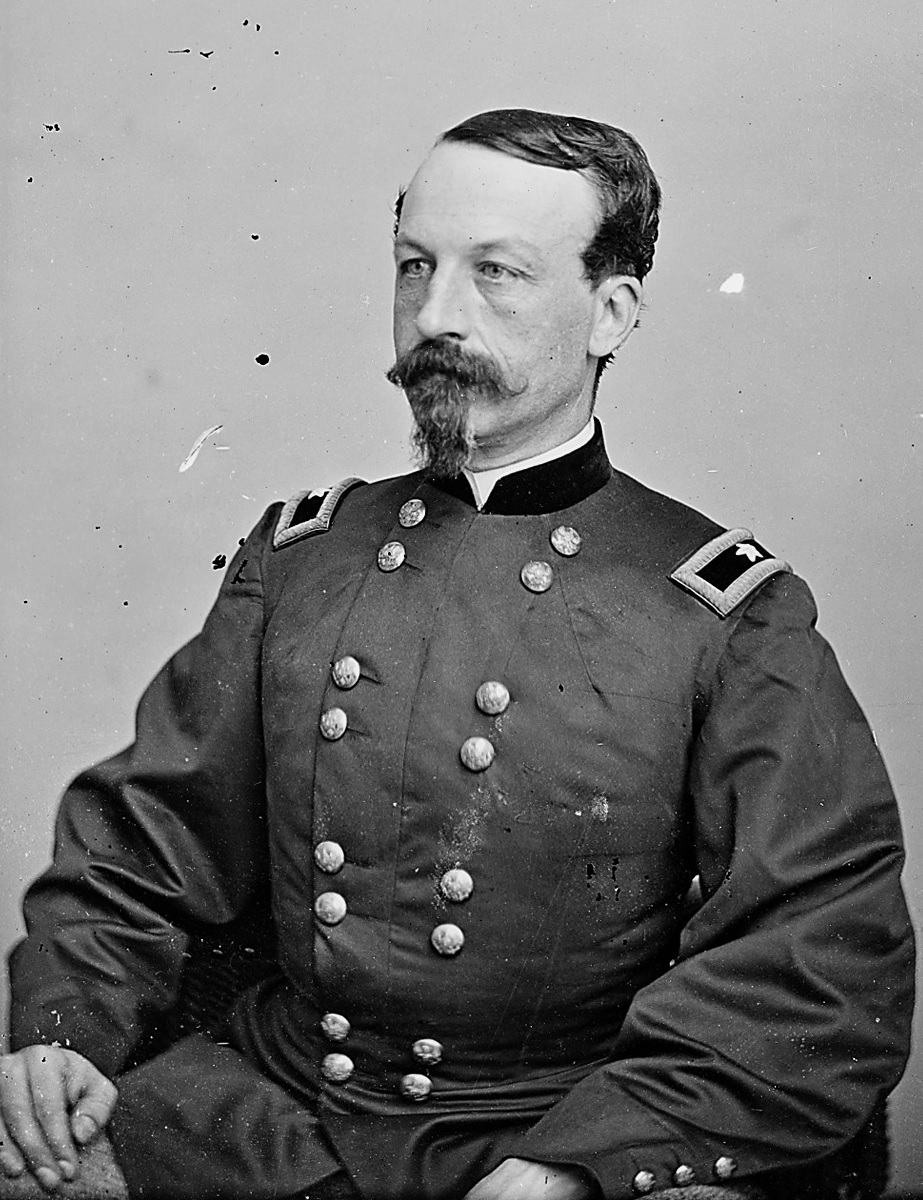
- Bvt. Brig. Gen. Washington C. Tevis
- Born: February 22, 1828; Philadelphia, Pennsylvania
- Died: September 29, 1900 (aged 72); Paris, France
- Burial place: Montparnasse Cemetery
- Other names: Charles Carroll Tevis; Nassim Bey
- Military career
- Allegiance: United States (Union); Khedivate of Egypt; Fenian Brotherhood; United Kingdom; Papal States; France
- Branch: United States Army; Union Army; Ottoman Army; Fenian Brotherhood; Papal Army; French Army; Egyptian Army
- Service years: 1849–1850, 1862–1864 (USA)
- Rank: Kaymakam (Lt. Colonel) (Ottomans); Colonel (USA); Bvt. Brigadier General (USA); Brigadier General (Fenians); Lt. Colonel (Papal Army); General de Brigade (France); Brigadier General (Egypt)
- Unit: 4th Delaware Volunteer Infantry
- Commands: 3rd Maryland Volunteer Cavalry
- Conflicts: Crimean War; American Civil War; Fenian raids Franco-Prussian War; Romanian War of Independence (as war correspondent)
- Other work: Spy, author, journalist, inventor

Washington Carroll Tevis (February 22, 1829 – September 29, 1900), also known as Charles Carroll Tevis, Nassim Bey and Charles Carroll de Taillevis, was an American-born soldier of fortune who served in a variety of armies and conflicts during the 19th century.

== Early life ==
Washington C. Tevis was born in Philadelphia, Pennsylvania, on February 22, 1829. His parents were Benjamin Tevis (1789–1845), a Unitarian and an auctioneer and commission merchant and Mary Hunter. Born in Maryland, Benjamin served as a First Lieutenant with the 39th Regiment of Maryland Militia during the War of 1812. Benjamin was involved with the Whig Party and the Hibernian Society of Philadelphia. In addition to Washington, the Tevis family had a daughter Martha Heloise Tevis who was born on August 7, 1826, but died on August 8, 1827.

Washington entered the University of Pennsylvania in 1842 and graduated in 1845 with a Master of Arts degree.

== United States Army ==
With an ongoing situation of war with Mexico brewing, Tevis was appointed at large to the United States Military Academy at West Point on June 30, 1845. He graduated 24th in his class of 43 on 1 July 1849, He was commissioned a Brevet Second Lieutenant with the Regiment of Mounted Riflemen. Tevis trained at the School of Cavalry Practice but resigned his commission on May 12, 1850. From May 1850 to November 1851 Tevis was a member of the prestigious First Troop Philadelphia City Cavalry.

== France, the Ottoman Empire, and the Crimean War ==
Financed by the inheritance from his late father Tevis traveled to Paris. There he began using the name "Charles Carroll Tevis". He converted to Roman Catholicism in 1853 where he received Baptism in the Chapel of the Archbishop of Paris, from the hands of then Monsignor Georges Darboy who was charged with Tevis's instruction and preparation in the faith.

On February 4, 1854, he was commissioned a Major or Binbashi in the army of the Ottoman Empire and soon advanced to the rank of Lieutenant Colonel or Kaymakam. He adopted the name of "Nessim Bey". Initially a staff officer Tevis led a force of Bashi-bazouks under General György Kmety in the Battle of Kurekdere, Battle of Indjédéré and the Siege of Kars. He was made an Officer in the Order of the Medjidie, a Grand Officer in the Order of Glory of the Ottoman Empire and was awarded the Medal for the Defence of Kars and the British Crimea Medal.

Tevis left the army in 1855 to return to Paris. There he published a book of warfare La Petite guerre et le service des avant-postes published by Guiraudet et Jouaust in 1855 and patented a revolver.

== Return to the United States ==
Tevis returned to Philadelphia in approximately 1859 and applied to have his name changed to Charles Carroll de Taillevis; believing it to be his original family name from a Huguenot who came to America in 1702.

Tevis eloped with Blanche Florance, the daughter of Jacob Florance, a successful merchant, and Hannah Levy Florance, of Philadelphia, in November 1860. Her parents, who were Jewish, reportedly objected to the marriage because Tevis was Christian. As a result, she was disinherited, though her father left her an inheritance after his death in 1867.

== The American Civil War ==
Though an experienced cavalryman, Tevis was commissioned a Lieutenant Colonel of Infantry in the United States Volunteers; the second in command of the 4th Delaware Volunteer Infantry Regiment on August 18, 1862. In addition to organising the regiment and serving with them at the defence of Baltimore he was involved in operations around Gloucester Point, Virginia. In June 1863 Lt. Col Tevis led a combined infantry force of 400 men, from several regiments in addition to his 4th Delaware, in an amphibious operation in the vicinity of Walkerton, Virginia, where his men successfully destroyed a large amount of Confederate supplies.

In September 1863 Lt. Col Tevis was selected by Brigadier General Robert C. Schenck to organise and lead an unusual cavalry regiment, the 3rd Maryland Volunteer Cavalry composed of hundreds of Confederate prisoners of war who agreed to serve the Union; many were captured at the Battle of Gettysburg.

The state of Maryland in the American Civil War contained large amounts of citizens loyal to both the Federal and Confederate governments. In addition to normal wartime military operations Tevis's regiment patrolled the areas of elections and made arrests. Tevis entered the forbidden zone of politics when on November 2, 1863, he issued a proclamation not only declaring that all qualified voters should engage in their right to vote, but to vote for the platform of the Unconditional Union Party as "recognized by the Federal authorities as loyal or worthy of the support of any one who desires the peace and restoration of the Union". Tevis's soldiers also arrested several candidates in the election. As a result, Brigadier Schenck ordered the withdrawal of the proclamation and the arrest of Tevis. After further investigation Schenck ordered Tevis released believing that Tevis acted in good faith, though he was quite wrong to sign the proclamation that was actually written by provost marshal and a candidate in the election, Captain John Frazier, however Tevis was honorably discharged July 20, 1864.

Prior to the ending of hostilities, Tevis' friend and fellow Philadelphian Charles Godfrey Leland used his influence with John Weiss Forney to obtain a Brevet commission as a Brigadier General for Tevis.

== Adjutant General of the Fenian Army ==
With the Civil War only recently ending, Tevis found himself in a new war at a much higher level of command. The Fenian Brotherhood Congress appointed Tevis a committeeman from the state of Pennsylvania.

Brigadier General Thomas William Sweeny was made Secretary of War in late 1865 by the Fenian Brotherhood who had a scheme to gain the independence of Ireland through military attacks on Canada. In November 1865 Tevis was appointed Adjutant General of the organisation, with the rank of Brigadier General one of nine men in Sweeny's Fenian General Staff.

Tevis and Major William O'Reilly purchased 4,220 Pennsylvania militia muskets from the Bridesburg, Philadelphia arsenal, however plans to purchase cannon did not come to fruition.

With the plans for Fenian Raids being devised, Tevis would lead the left wing of the assault on Canada in May 1866. He organised and would transport 3,000 Fenian raiders leaving from Chicago, then linking up with Fenians in Milwaukee to steam up Lake Michigan to land for operations in Goderich, Ontario. The Western invasion did not come to pass because Tevis was unable to organise the invader's transportation. Major General Sweeny dismissed Brig. Gen. C. C. Tevis, Adjutant General, for disobedience of orders.

Though there are theories that the United States Government did not want the Fenian plans to actually succeed, Tevis was in the pay of the British Crown as a secret agent for £100 each month. He would remain providing information to Her Majesty's Secret Service for years to come. The British Ambassador to the United States Frederick Wright-Bruce reported that Tevis "quarreled with the Fenian leaders and is now ready to do them as much harm as possible".

== The Army of the Pope ==
Though the 1853 announcement of Tevis's conversion to Roman Catholicism mentioned that he would join the Army of the Papal States as an officer, it was not until after his Fenian adventures that Tevis enlisted as a private soldier in the Papal Zouaves an international legion of soldiers. With the Papal States facing continued opposition from those Italians desiring Rome be incorporated into a united Italy, Tevis proposed he recruit a separate battalion of battle experienced American soldiers to fight for the Pope with Tevis being commissioned a Lieutenant Colonel. Tevis fired off a barrage of letters to the Freeman's Journal, an American Roman Catholic newspaper including a statement that if each Roman Catholic parish in the United States provided $100 in gold a year, a battalion of 1,000 fighters could be equipped and sent to Rome. Four American bishops opposed the scheme. Tevis was to be sent to the United States to drum up volunteers, but upon his arrival in Paris he heard of the opposition of the American bishops. Tevis resigned his commission.

For his efforts the Pope knighted Tevis Chamberlain of the Sword and Cape on February 22, 1868, and ennobled him with the title of Count. On March 10, 1869, Tevis he was appointed a Commander of the Royal Order of Francis I by order of the exiled Francis II of the Two Sicilies.

== Franco Prussian War ==
On 14 December 1870 Tevis was granted the provisional rank of brigade general and placed in command of General Camille Cremer's division's 2nd Brigade attached to the Armée de l'Est. Tevis's command included Francs-tireurs and Garde Mobile. Tevis's brigade fought in several battles of the war where he was wounded at the Battle of the Lisaine concluding with the Battle of Chenebier in January 1871 where the French troops under their General Charles-Denis Bourbaki marched into Switzerland and were interned. General Tevis became a French citizen in January 1871 and was made a Chevalier in the Legion of Honor

== The Army of Egypt ==
In 1870 Khedive Isma'il Pasha of Egypt sought to modernise his army and was eager to reduce reliance on French military advisors at a time when French and British government and banking interests were increasing their demands, including demands for laborers in digging the Suez Canal. An American adventurer named Thaddeus P. Mott connected the Khedive's government to American General William Tecumseh Sherman, then President Ulysses S. Grant's Commanding General of the United States Army. Sherman recommended former American General Charles Pomeroy Stone for the job. General Stone was commissioned an Egyptian Lieutenant General and Chief of Staff of the Egyptian Army. General Stone, or "Ferik Pasha", recruited several American veterans of varying ranks who served with both the Federal Government and the Confederacy including Tevis. Tevis was commissioned in 1872 as a Brigadier-General and commanded the Military Engineering School at Abbassia, in Cairo. Tevis left the service of Egypt in 1873. He was one of about fifty Americans who served in the Egyptian Army during the era of Khedive Ismail; relative to the others, his stint in Egypt was one of the shortest.

== War Correspondent and journalist ==
His military leadership days behind him, Tevis acted as a journalist for both the Philadelphia Times and the New York Times. For the latter he resided in Bucharest during the Romanian War of Independence from April to November 1877 where he wrote an account of the Siege of Plevna. He covered the war until being expelled by the Russians.

In 1878 he was one of the United States Commissioners at the Exposition Universelle.

== Double Agent On Her Majesty's Secret Service ==
Whilst residing in Paris Tevis provided information to Great Britain acting as a double agent on plots by both Fenians and Maharaja Duleep Singh, who proclaimed himself "the Sovereign of the Sikh nation and Implacable Foe of the British Government" in a plot for a Sikh Uprising in India using Russian assistance.

== Personal life ==
Tevis had a wife prior to Blanche Florance, but nothing is known about her. Tevis and Blanche Florance had one child, Marie-Adele Florance Tevis (August 11, 1865- 1936) who married Henri Etienne Esperance Gouget de Landres (14 February 1852 – 15 June 1937) later a General in the French cavalry on 1 April 1888 in Paris.

Tevis and Blanche divorced on January 12, 1885. Blanche died 28 June 1924 at her home in Paris, France.

Washington/Charles Carroll Tevis died in Paris on September 29, 1900; and was buried there at Montparnasse Cemetery.

== Tevis in popular culture ==
James Weber Brown played the role of General Tevis in The Black Prince (2017).

George Augustus Henry Sala's 1856 short stories The Dalgetty Race published in Household Words edited by Charles Dickens and A Journey Due North : Being Notes of a Residence in Russia feature an American soldier of fortune "Nessim Bey" under the name "Washington Lafayette Bowie".
