= 3rd Maryland Cavalry Regiment =

3rd Maryland Volunteer Cavalry
- Active: August 8, 1863 – September 7, 1865
- Country: United States of America
- Allegiance: Union
- Branch: Cavalry
- Engagements: Battle of Flemming's Ford; Red River Campaign; Battle of Mansura; Battle of Marksville; Battle of Yellow Bayou; Battle of Mobile Bay; Siege of Fort Morgan; Battle of Spanish Fort

The 3rd Maryland Volunteer Cavalry (a.k.a. "Bradford Dragoons") was a cavalry regiment that served in the Union Army during the American Civil War.

== Service ==
The 3rd Maryland Cavalry was organized in Baltimore, Maryland beginning August 8, 1863 through January 9, 1864 and mustered in for three-year service under the command of Colonel Charles Carroll Tevis. The regiment was consolidated from ten companies to a battalion of six companies on December 9, 1864.

The regiment was attached to Cavalry Reserve, VIII Corps, Middle Department, to January 1864. Unattached, Defenses of New Orleans, Louisiana, Department of the Gulf, to March 1864. District of LaFourche, Department of the Gulf, to June 1864. District of Morganza, Department of the Gulf, to August 1864. United States forces, Mobile Bay, Department of the Gulf, to December 1865. District of Southern Alabama, Military Division of West Mississippi, to May 1865. 1st Brigade, 2nd Division, Cavalry Corps, Military Division of West Mississippi, to June 1865. Department of Mississippi to September 1865.

The 3rd Maryland Cavalry mustered out September 7, 1865 at Vicksburg, Mississippi.

== Detailed service ==
Duty in the defenses of Baltimore, Md., until January 1864. Ordered to New Orleans, La., then to Madisonville, La., and duty there until March 1864. Expedition to Franklinton February 1–3. Flemming's Ford, Madisonville, February 11. Ordered to Brashear City March 14 and duty there until June. At Morganza until July. Expedition to the Atchafalaya May 30-June 5. Morgan's Ferry Road June 9. Ordered to New Orleans, La., July 1. Dismounted July 7. Sailed from Algiers for Mobile Bay, Ala., August 5. Siege operations against Fort Morgan August 9–23. Capture of Fort Morgan August 23. Post duty at Dauphin's Island and in the District of Southern Alabama until March 1865. Campaign against Mobile March and April. Garrison duty at Fort Gaines until April 30. Ordered to New Orleans, La., April 30, and duty there until June. Ordered to Natchez, Miss., June 20. Duty there and in the Department of Mississippi until September.

== Casualties ==
The regiment lost a total of 95 men during service; 11 enlisted men killed or mortally wounded, 4 officers and 80 enlisted men died of disease.

== Commanders ==
- Colonel Charles Carroll Tevis was born Washington Carroll Tevis

== See also ==
- List of Maryland Civil War units
- Maryland in the American Civil War
