= 4th Delaware Infantry Regiment =

- Active: June 1862 - June 3, 1865
- Country: United States
- Allegiance: Union
- Branch: Infantry
- Engagements: Battle of Cold Harbor; Siege of Petersburg; First Battle of Petersburg; Second Battle of Petersburg; Battle of Globe Tavern; Battle of Boydton Plank Road; Battle of Hatcher's Run; Appomattox Campaign; Battle of Five Forks; Battle of Appomattox Court House

The 4th Delaware Infantry Regiment was an infantry regiment in the Union Army during the American Civil War.

== Service ==
The 4th Delaware Infantry Regiment was organized at Wilmington, Delaware beginning June through November 1862 and mustered in for three years' service.

The regiment was attached to Defenses of Baltimore, VIII Corps, Middle Department, to December 1862. Busteed's Independent Brigade, IV Corps, Department of Virginia, to May 1863. King's Independent Brigade, IV Corps, to June 1863. Unattached, IV Corps, to July. Unassigned, King's Division, XXII Corps, Department of Washington, to January 1864. Tyler's Division, XXII Corps, to May 1864. 2nd Brigade, 4th Division, V Corps, Army of the Potomac, to August 1864. 3rd Brigade, 2nd Division, V Corps, to June 1865.

The 4th Delaware Infantry mustered out of service June 3, 1865.

== Detailed service ==
Ordered to Baltimore, Maryland, September 1862. Duty in the defenses of Baltimore until December 1862. Ordered to Yorktown, Virginia, arriving there December 28, and duty there until July 1863. Expedition from Gloucester Point to Gloucester Court House April 7, 1863. Reconnaissance from Gloucester Point to Hickory Fork April 12. Expedition from Gloucester Point into Matthews County May 19–22. Expedition from Yorktown to Walkerton and Aylett's June 4–5. Dix's Peninsula Campaign June 24-July 7. Expedition from White House to South Anna River July 1–7. Baltimore Store July 2. Moved to Washington, D.C., July 8–14, and duty in the defenses of that city and at Centreville and Fairfax Station until October 1863. Guarding Orange & Alexandria Railroad until November 16. Ordered to Delaware November 16. Duty in the District of Alexandria, Virginia, until May 1864. Ordered to join the Army of the Potomac in the field May 1864. Rapidan Campaign May 29-June 15. Totopotomoy May 29–31. Cold Harbor June 1–12. Before Petersburg June 16–18. Siege of Petersburg June 16, 1864 to April 2, 1865. Mine Explosion, Petersburg, July 30, 1864 (reserves). Weldon Railroad, August 18–21. Poplar Springs Church September 29-October 1. Yellow House October 1–3. Boydton Plank Road, Hatcher's Run, October 27–28. Warren's Raid on Weldon Railroad December 7–12. Dabney's Mills, Hatcher's Run, February 5–7, 1865. Appomattox Campaign March 28-April 9. Lewis Farm, near Gravelly Run, March 29. White Oak Road March 30. Gravelly Run March 31. Five Forks April 1. Fall of Petersburg April 2. Pursuit of Lee April 3–9. Appomattox Court House April 9. Surrender of Lee and his army. Moved to Washington, D.C., May 1–12. Grand Review of the Armies May 23.

== Casualties ==
The regiment lost a total of 164 men during service; 4 officers and 80 enlisted men killed or mortally wounded, 1 officer and 79 enlisted men died of disease.

== Notable members ==
- Lieutenant Colonel Washington Carroll Tevis - post-war soldier of fortune
- Captain Samuel Rodmond Smith, C Company Commander - Medal of Honor recipient for action at Rowanty Creek, Virginia
- 1st Lieutenant David E. Buckingham, Company E - Medal of Honor recipient for action at Rowanty Creek, Virginia
- Richard Gilpin Buckingham, Company E, sergeant major

== See also ==
- List of Delaware Civil War units
- Delaware in the Civil War
