= Compensated emancipation in the United States =

Compensated emancipation in the United States, sometimes reparations for slave owners, was the concept of paying slave owners for their slaves as a path to eventual total abolition.

In the United States, the regulation of slavery was predominantly a state function. Northern states followed a course of gradual emancipation starting in the 1830s. During the Civil War, in November 1861, President Lincoln drafted an act to be introduced before the legislature of Delaware, one of the four slave states that did not secede from the Union (the others being Kentucky, Maryland, and Missouri), for compensated emancipation. However, this was narrowly defeated. Lincoln was also behind national legislation towards the same end, but the Southern states, which regarded themselves as having seceded from the Union, ignored the proposals. In 1863, state legislation towards compensated emancipation in Maryland failed to pass, as did an attempt to include it in a newly written Missouri constitution.

The District of Columbia compensated emancipation of 1862–63 was the only such program in the United States. Baltimore slave trader Bernard M. Campbell provided the appraisals to the commission; the highest valued person was a blacksmith deemed to be worth $1800, the lowest valued person was a two-month-old mulatto baby appraised at $25.

The American historian R. R. Palmer opined that the abolition of slavery in the United States without compensation to the former slave owners was an "annihilation of individual property rights without parallel ...in the history of the Western world". Economic historian Robert E. Wright argues that compensated emancipation would have been much cheaper, with fewer deaths, if the federal government had purchased and freed all the slaves, rather than fighting the Civil War. Another economic historian, Roger Ransom, writes that Gerald Gunderson compared compensated emancipation to the cost of the war and "notes that the two are roughly the same order of magnitude – 2.5 to 3.7 billion dollars". Ransom also writes that compensated emancipation would have tripled federal outlays if paid over the period of 25 years, and was a program that had no political support within the United States during the 1860s.
