= David Buckingham (academic) =

British academic

David Dennis Buckingham, FBA, FAcSS (born 6 October 1954) is an English media, communications, and education scholar and retired academic.

== Career ==
David Dennis Buckingham was born on 6 October 1954. He completed his undergraduate studies at Clare College, Cambridge, graduating in 1975. He worked at the Inner London Education Authority from 1978 to 1984, during which time he also completed film studies master's degree at the Polytechnic of Central London (in 1982). In 1984, he joined the Institute of Education as a lecturer, and completed a doctorate there in 1993 (awarded for his thesis "The development of television literacy: talk, text and context"). Three years later, he was promoted to a readership at the institute, and in 1999 was promoted again to Professor of Education. He remained in that post until taking up a professorship at Loughborough University in 2012; he retired in 2014 and was appointed an emeritus fellow at Loughborough.

According to his university profile, Buckingham specialises in "children's and young people's interactions with electronic media, and on media literacy education"; his British Academy profile adds that he maintains interests in "media use, civic participation, consumerism, youth culture, sexuality, media literacy, media regulation, identity".

== Honours and awards ==
Buckingham was elected a Fellow of the Academy of Social Sciences (FAcSS) in 2011, and four years later he was also elected a Fellow of the British Academy (FBA), the United Kingdom's national academy of the humanities and social sciences.

== Selected publications ==
- (Editor) Reading Audiences: Young People and the Media (Manchester University Press, 1993).
- Children Talking Television: The Making of Television Literacy (Falmer, 1993).
- Moving Images: Understanding Children's Emotional Responses to Television (Manchester University Press, 1996).
- The Making of Citizens: Young People, News and Politics (Routledge, 2000).
- After the Death of Childhood: Growing up in the Age of Electronic Media (Open University Press, 2000).
- Media Education: Literacy, Learning and Contemporary Culture (Polity Press, 2003).
- Beyond Technology: Children's Learning in the Age of Digital Culture (Wiley, 2007).
- The Material Child: Growing Up in Consumer Culture (Wiley, 2011).
