= David E. Buckingham =

David Eastburn Buckingham
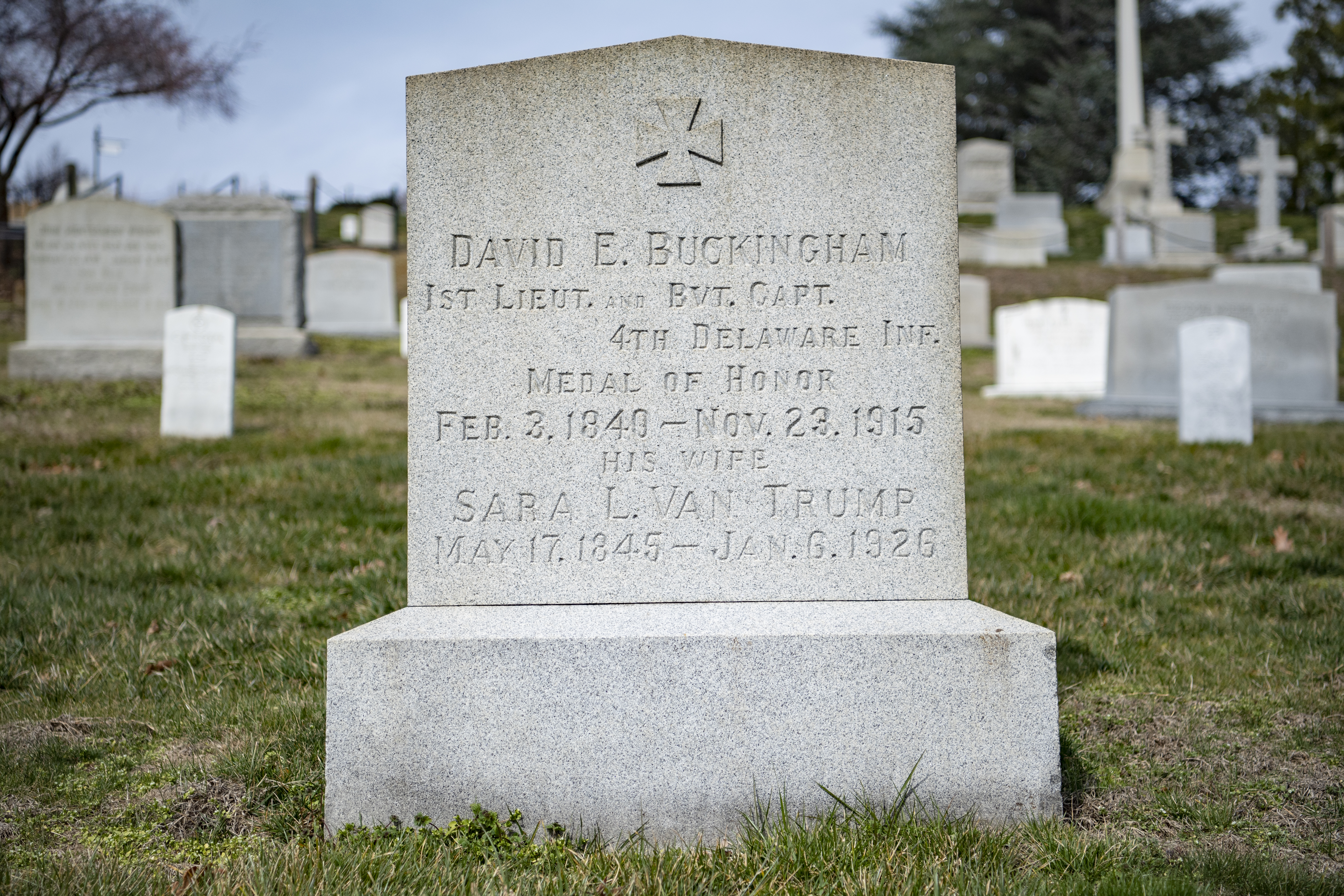
- Grave at Arlington National Cemetery
- Born: March 3, 1840; Stanton, Delaware
- Died: November 23, 1915 (aged 75)
- Burial place: Arlington National Cemetery
- Military career
- Allegiance: United States of America
- Branch: United States Army; Union Army
- Rank: First Lieutenant
- Unit: 4th Regiment Delaware Volunteer Infantry - Company E
- Awards: Medal of Honor

First Lieutenant David Eastburn Buckingham (February 3, 1840 to November 23, 1915) was an American soldier who fought in the American Civil War. Buckingham received the country's highest award for bravery during combat, the Medal of Honor, for his action at Rowanty Creek in Virginia on 5 February 1865. He was honored with the award on 13 February 1895.

== Biography ==
Buckingham was born on 3 February 1840 and enlisted in the 4th Delaware Volunteer Infantry. On 5 February 1865 he, along with S. Rodmond Smith, swam across the Rowanty Creek, which was partially frozen, in order to capture a crossing. A crossing in military strategy refers to taking control of a key point where a river, bridge, or road crosses; it is usually important for logistics or troop movement. Securing the crossing ensures control over travel routes and can be vital in battles. Buckingham was awarded with the Medal of Honor on 13 February 1895 for this feat.

He died on 23 November 1915 and his remains are interred at the Arlington National Cemetery.

== Medal of Honor citation ==
Swam the partly frozen creek, under fire, in the attempt to capture a crossing.

== See also ==
- List of American Civil War Medal of Honor recipients: A–F
