= Battle of Five Forks order of battle: Confederate =

The following Confederate Army units and commanders fought in the Battle of Five Forks of the American Civil War. The Union order of battle is listed separately.

== Abbreviations used ==
=== Military rank ===
- MG = Major General
- BG = Brigadier General
- Col = Colonel
- Ltc = Lieutenant Colonel
- Maj = Major
- Cpt = Captain

=== Other ===
- w = wounded
- mw = mortally wounded

== Confederate Army ==
MG George Pickett, Commanding

Division	Brigade	Regiments and Others
Pickett's Division	Steuart's Brigade BG George H. Steuart	9th Virginia: Col James J. Philips; 14th Virginia: Col William White; 38th Virginia: Col George K. Griggs; 53rd Virginia: Col William R. Aylett; 57th Virginia: Col Clement R. Fontaine
Pickett's Division	Corse's Brigade BG Montgomery Dent Corse	15th Virginia: Ltc Emmett M. Morrison; 17th Virginia: Col Arthur Herbert; 29th Virginia: Col James Giles; 30th Virginia: Col Robert S. Chew; 32nd Virginia: Ltc William R. Willis
Pickett's Division	Hunton's Brigade BG Eppa Hunton	8th Virginia: Ltc Edmund Berkeley; 18th Virginia: Col Henry A. Carrington; 19th Virginia: Maj Waller M. Boyd; 28th Virginia: Ltc William M. Wingfield; 56th Virginia: Col William E. Green
Pickett's Division	Terry's Brigade Col Joseph Mayo, Jr.	1st Virginia: Ltc Frank H. Langley; 3rd Virginia: Ltc Joseph V. Scott; 7th Virginia: Col Charles C. Floweree; 11th Virginia: Cpt Robert M. Mitchell, Jr.; 24th Virginia: Maj William Bentley
Pickett's Division	Pegram's Artillery Battalion Col William Pegram (mw); Ltc Joseph McGraw	Braxton's Battery: Carpenter's Battery: Crenshaw Battery (Virginia): Cpt Thomas Ellett

Division	Brigade	Regiments and Others
Johnson's Division	Wallace's Brigade BG William Henry Wallace	17th South Carolina: Col Fitz William McMaster; 18th South Carolina: Ltc W. B. Allison; 22nd South Carolina: Col William G. Burt; 23rd South Carolina: Col Henry L. Benbow; 26th South Carolina: Col Alexander D. Smith; Holcombe Legion (South Carolina): Col William J. Crawley
Johnson's Division	Ransom's Brigade BG Matt Whitaker Ransom	24th North Carolina: 25th North Carolina: Col Henry M. Rutledge; 35th North Carolina: Col James T. Johnson; 49th North Carolina: Col Lee M. McAfee; 56th North Carolina: Ltc G. Gratiott Luke

=== Cavalry Corps ===
MG Fitzhugh Lee

Division	Brigade	Regiments and Others
Fitzhugh Lee's Cavalry Division Col Thomas T. Munford	Payne's Brigade BG William H. F. Payne (w); Col Reuben B. Boston	5th Virginia Cavalry: Ltc James H. Allen; 6th Virginia Cavalry: Col Reuben B. Boston, Ltc Daniel T. Richards; 8th Virginia Cavalry: Maj Thomas P. Bowen; 36th Virginia Cavalry Battalion: Maj James W. Sweeney
Fitzhugh Lee's Cavalry Division Col Thomas T. Munford	Munford's Brigade Col Thomas T. Munford	1st Virginia Cavalry: Col William A. Morgan; 2nd Virginia Cavalry: Ltc Cary Breckenridge; 3rd Virginia Cavalry: Col Thomas H. Owen; 4th Virginia Cavalry: Maj Charles Old

Division	Brigade	Regiments and Others
William H. F. Lee's Cavalry Division MG William Henry Fitzhugh Lee	Barrington's Brigade BG Rufus Barringer	1st North Carolina Cavalry: 2nd North Carolina Cavalry: 3rd North Carolina Cavalry: 5th North Carolina Cavalry: Col James H. McNeill
William H. F. Lee's Cavalry Division MG William Henry Fitzhugh Lee	Beale's Brigade BG Richard L. T. Beale	9th Virginia Cavalry: Maj Samuel A. Swann; 10th Virginia Cavalry: Ltc Zachariah S. McGruder; 13th Virginia Cavalry: Maj Benjamin F. Winfield; 14th Virginia Cavalry: Ltc George Jackson
William H. F. Lee's Cavalry Division MG William Henry Fitzhugh Lee	Roberts' Brigade BG William Paul Roberts	4th North Carolina Cavalry: Col Dennis D. Ferebee; 16th North Carolina Cavalry Battalion:
Rosser's Cavalry Division MG Thomas L. Rosser	Dearing's Brigade BG James Dearing	7th Virginia Cavalry: Col Richard Henry Dulany; 11th Virginia Cavalry: Maj Edward H. McDonald; 12th Virginia Cavalry: Col Asher W. Harman; 35th Virginia Cavalry Battalion: Ltc Elijah V. White
Rosser's Cavalry Division MG Thomas L. Rosser	McCausland's Brigade BG John McCausland	16th Virginia Cavalry: Col Milton Ferguson; 17th Virginia Cavalry: Maj Frederick F. Smith; 21st Virginia Cavalry: Maj Stephen P. Halsey; 22nd Virginia Cavalry: Maj Henry F. Kendrick; McGregor's Battery: Maj William M. McGregor

== See also ==
- Virginia in the American Civil War
