= Delaware in the American Civil War =

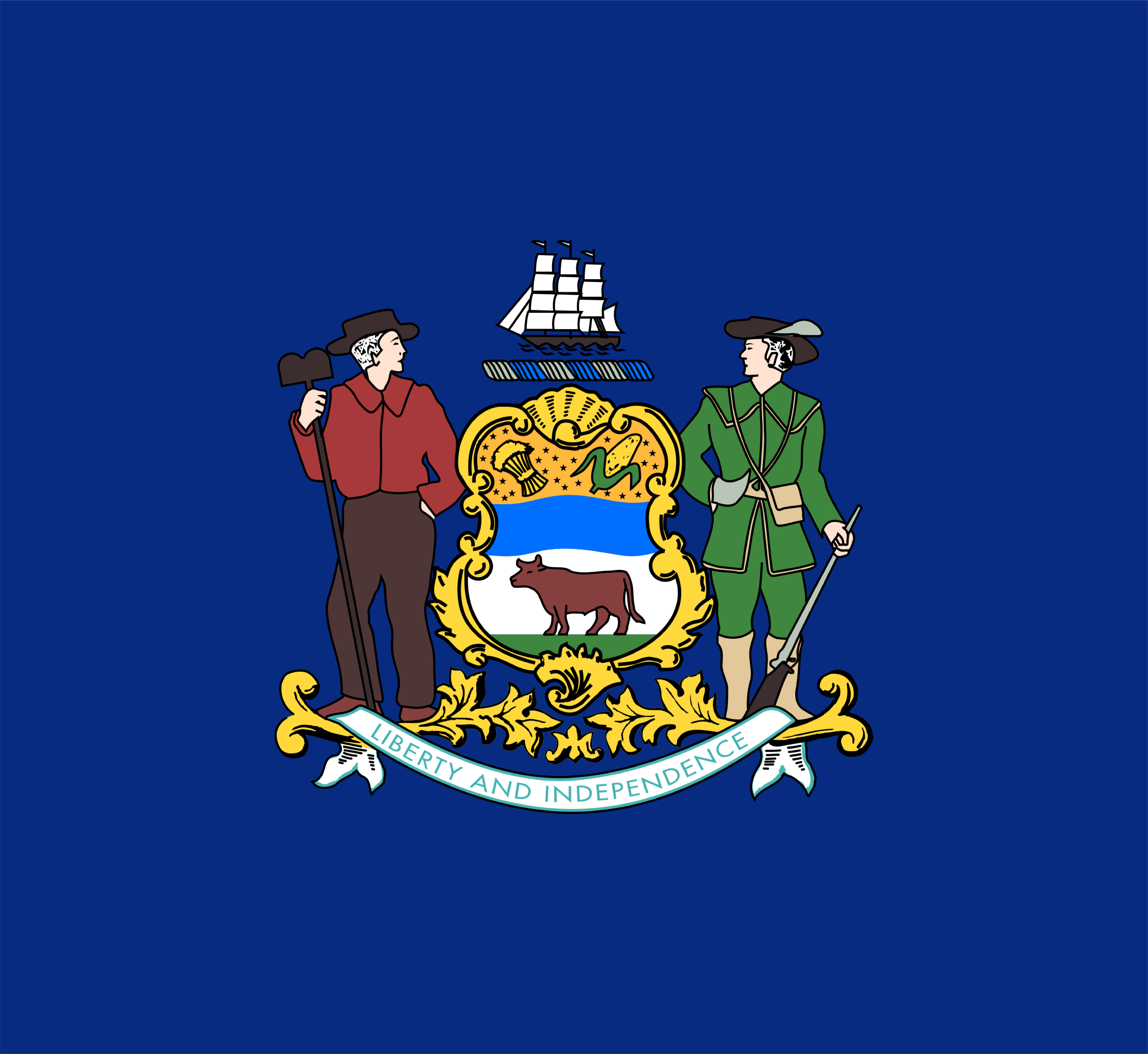
Flag of Delaware during the 1860s.

During the American Civil War, the southern border state of Delaware remained in the Union even though it was a slave state. At the outbreak of the secession crisis, Delaware's political establishment rejected efforts to leave the Union and sided with the Federal government led by President Abraham Lincoln. Although the state was never seriously at risk of seceding, many people in Delaware sympathized with the South, and during the course of the war Delaware's Democratic-controlled state legislature strongly opposed wartime measures to end slavery. Despite its small size, with a population of only 112,000 in 1860, Delaware supplied more than 12,000 men for the Union army, and the DuPont powder mills in Wilmington were an essential source of gunpowder for the Northern war effort.

== Slavery in Delaware ==
Slavery had been a divisive issue across the nation for decades before the Civil War began, but slavery in Delaware had long been in decline by the 1860s. An 1847 bill to emancipate Delaware's slave population passed the state house of representatives, but failed in the state senate by a single vote. Opposition to slavery in Delaware, imported from Quaker Pennsylvania, led many slaveowners to free their slaves; half of the state's Black population was free by 1810, and more than 90% were free by the outbreak of the Civil War.

Despite the lower prevalence of slavery, escaped slaves and free Blacks in Delaware were still at risk of being kidnapped and sold to plantations in other states. There were various legal restrictions placed on Delaware's free Black people: who were not allowed to hold political meetings, own firearms, vote, or hold public office. The total Black population of Delaware in 1860 was 21,627 (19% of the state's population), with 19,829 free people of color and 1,798 people enslaved. The prevalence of slavery and the strength of pro-slavery sentiment was greatest in Sussex County, the southernmost of Delaware's three counties, but even there free Blacks outnumbered slaves by 3:1.

Following the outbreak of the war, President Abraham Lincoln's initial plan to end slavery was a program of compensated emancipation, and he approached Delaware's Congressional Representative George P. Fisher in late 1861 with this project due to the state's small enslaved population. Under this program, the federal government would have paid Delaware $90,000 per year over 10 years, and the state would use those funds to compensate slaveholders for freeing their slaves. While canvassing the state legislators to determine if the vote would pass, the proposal did not find sufficient support and the project did not move forward. The Emancipation Proclamation of January 1, 1863 freed only the slaves in regions currently "in rebellion against the United States," so it did not apply to Delaware's remaining slave population.

On February 8, 1865 Delaware's General Assembly, controlled by pro-slavery Democrats, voted to reject the Thirteenth Amendment to the United States Constitution and therefore continue the existence of legal slavery beyond the Civil War. However, the gesture proved futile when other states ratified the amendment, which took effect in December 1865 and thereby ended slavery nationwide. In a symbolic move, Delaware belatedly ratified the amendment on February 12, 1901 – 35 years after national ratification and 38 years after President Lincoln's Emancipation Proclamation.

== Secession crisis ==
Following the election of Abraham Lincoln in November 1860, South Carolina left the Union on December 20, and other Southern slaveholding states began holding secession conventions. As a state where slavery was legal, some Southerners expected Delaware to join them, and their political leaders sent commissioners to try to convince Delaware to secede. Delaware Senator James A. Bayard Jr. supported slavery and secession, and he encouraged Delaware Governor William Burton to call a secession convention as the southern states had done. Governor Burton addressed the legislature on January 2, 1861, defending the continuation of slavery and blaming "fanatical" Northern abolitionists for the crisis, and although he closed by saying "the preservation of the Union is my most earnest prayer," Burton recommended they vote to hold a secession convention. However, the state lawmakers opposed leaving the Union due to Delaware's geographic vulnerability and economic ties to the North, and on January 3 they passed a resolution condemning secession.

Following the Battle of Fort Sumter and the outbreak of the war in April 1861, public sentiment shifted further and mass-meetings were held to demonstrate support of the Union. However, Southern sympathies were still prevalent in parts of Delaware, with a member of the du Pont family writing to Robert E. Lee in April, claiming that "a strong feeling in the two lower counties of Delaware is aroused in favor of Delaware joining the Southern Confederacy," and asking for arms and men to sabotage the railroads. After Fort Sumter, Governor Burton changed his position to a decidedly pro-Union stance. He called on the people of Delaware to "sustain the laws of the Government under which we live," took action to secure the crucial DuPont gunpowder mills, and encouraged volunteers to enlist in the Federal army.

== Military enlistment ==
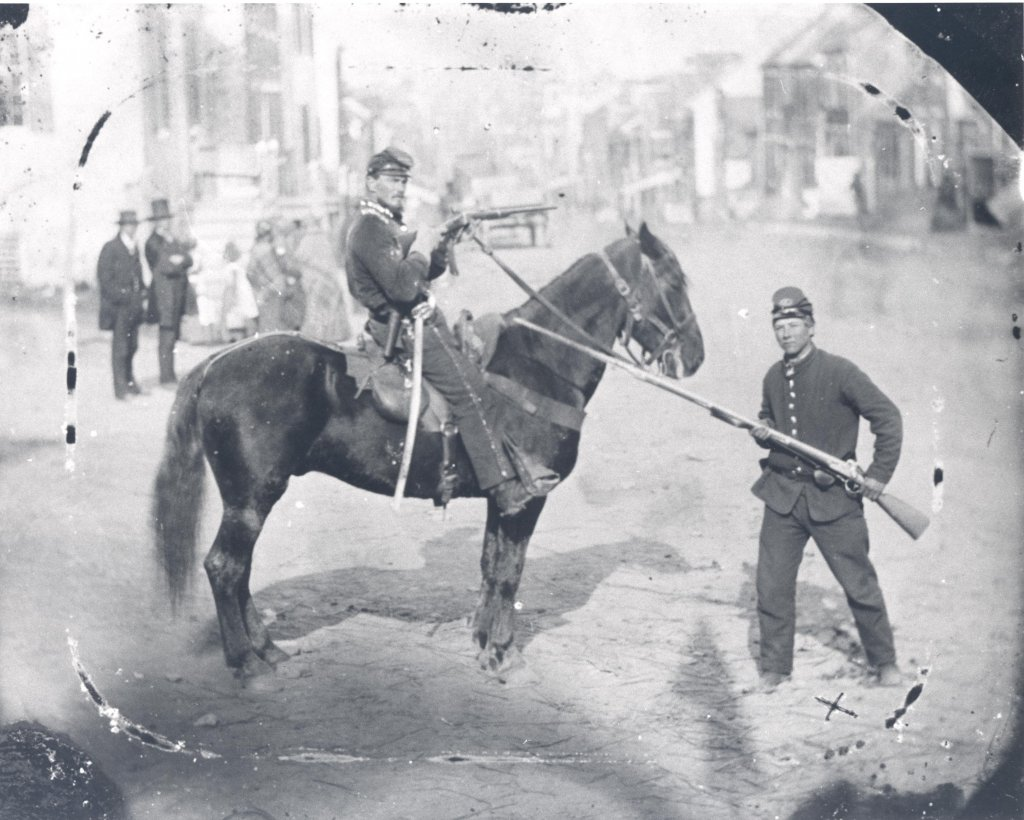
Napoleon B. Knight of the 1st Delaware Cavalry, Westminster, Maryland, 1863.

Unlike many other states North and South, at the outbreak of the Civil War Delaware did not have an official state militia the Governor could call on to provide military service. As tensions rose following the 1860 election, rival volunteer pro-Union and pro-Southern militia companies began forming throughout the state. To maintain order and keep the state on the side of the Union, Governor Burton appointed Henry du Pont, the head of the DuPont company and a committed Unionist, as Major General of the state militia forces. Du Pont was able to disarm the pro-Southern organizations and prevent the outbreak of any clashes between rival factions.

During the course of the war, Delaware supplied 11,236 white soldiers to the Union army, 954 Black soldiers to the US Colored Troops, and 94 US Navy sailors and Marines. These troops were organized into 9 infantry regiments, 1 cavalry regiment, 2 artillery batteries, and 2 independent companies. Of the Delaware troops that served, 882 died during the war: 383 were killed or mortally wounded in combat, 356 were killed by disease, and 143 died from other causes.

Although most Delaware citizens fought for the Union, a small number of men did serve in the Confederate States Army in Maryland and Virginia Regiments. Delaware was the only slave state from which the Confederacy could not recruit a full regiment.

== Wartime production ==
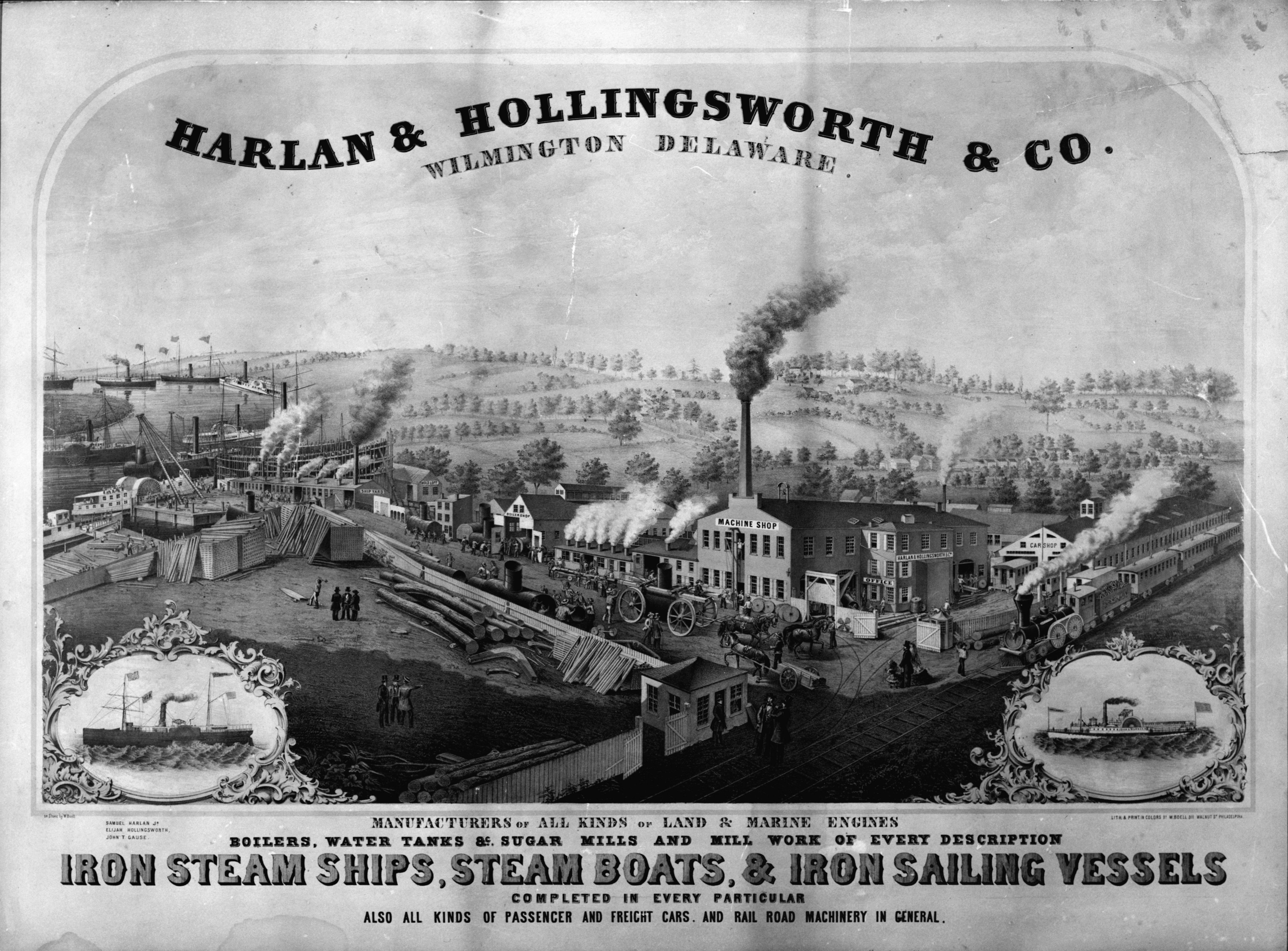
Advertisement for the Harlan and Hollingsworth shipbuilding company, Wilmington.

Northern Delaware was highly industrialized, and this part of the state provided economically-vital services to the Union such as gunpowder production, railway carriage manufacturing, and shipbuilding. As the home of the DuPont corporation, founded in 1802 near Wilmington, the state of Delaware was a crucial supplier of materiel to the Union. In 1860 DuPont supplied 40% of all the US Army's gunpowder, and the company's sales of powder increased from a pre-war value of $752,000 annually to a peak of $1,625,000 in 1864. Workers at the DuPont powder mills were exempted from the draft, and the Secretary of War Edwin Stanton, aware of the importance of the DuPont works, was concerned the facility might be vulnerable to Confederate attacks. In September 1862, Confederate spies were arrested while on a reconnaissance mission at the DuPont powder mill.

Wilmington was a major shipbuilding center, and the leading producer of iron-hulled ships in the years before the war. Many of the shipyards such as Pusey and Jones and Harlan and Hollingsworth focused on military production during the war years, building ironclad monitors for the Navy. The monitors USS Patapsco, USS Saugus, and USS Napa were all built in Wilmington.

== Politics and government ==
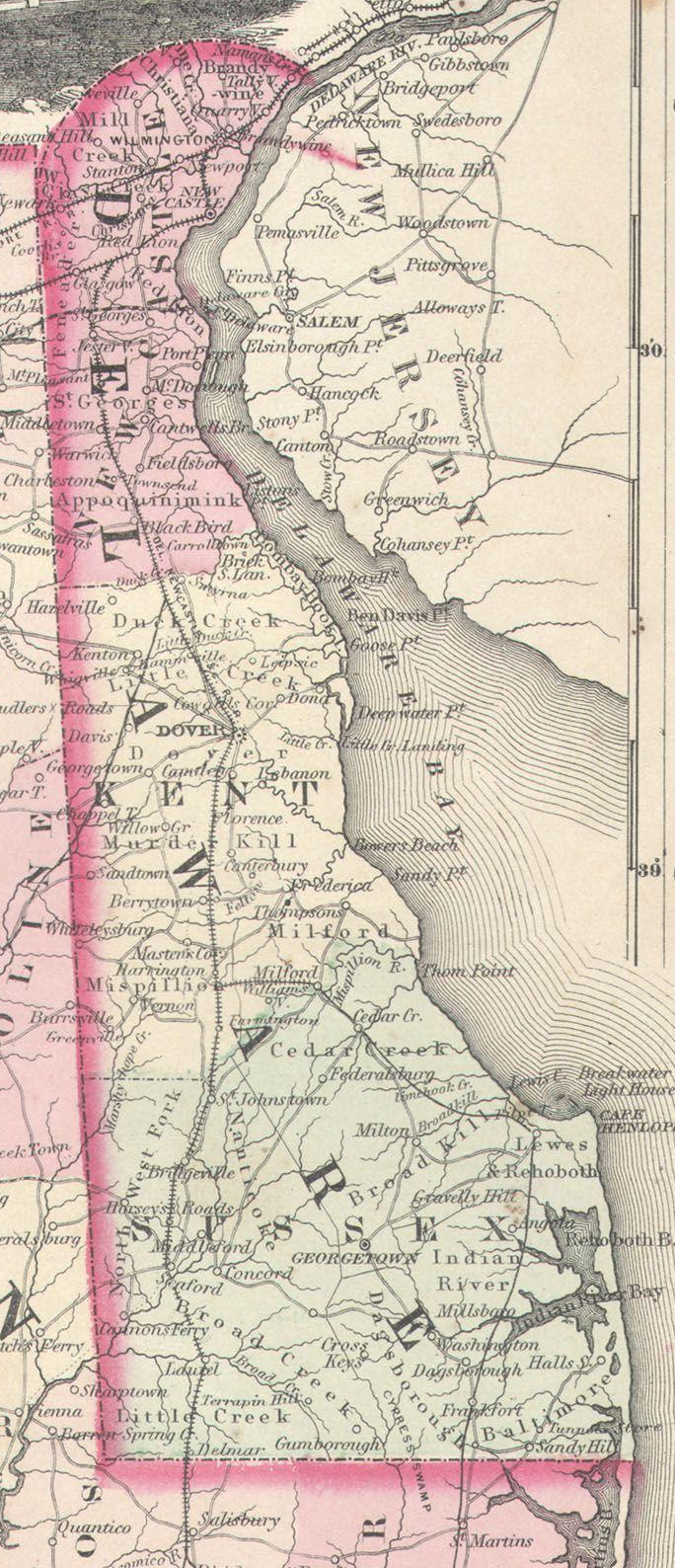
1861 map of Delaware

The state government of Delaware was dominated by pro-slavery Democrats, and unlike many other states the Delaware legislature maintained a Democratic majority throughout the war. Although industrial New Castle County contained half the state's population, each Delaware county received equal representation in the state legislature, giving the southern agricultural counties disproportionate voting power. Despite Delaware remaining loyal to the Union, many of the state's Democrats were sympathetic to the South, opposed ending slavery, and rejected equal rights for Black Americans. In Delaware the state constitution specified that only white men could vote, and Abraham Lincoln came in 3rd place in Delaware during the 1860 United States presidential election, with Southern Democrat John C. Breckinridge receiving the most votes in the state. In the 1864 election, a slim majority carried Delaware for Lincoln's Democratic opponent, George B. McClellan.

Tensions between pro-Union and pro-Southern factions were high leading up to Delaware's November 1862 election for governor. During local elections in October, there were numerous assaults and at least one person was killed. Rumors spread that pro-Southerners from Maryland would infiltrate Delaware polling places to affect the outcome. Due to these fears, the local Republican party asked for federal troops to be sent to keep the peace during the November election. Republican William Cannon won the Governorship, but the presence of troops guarding polling places inflamed the feelings of pro-Southern Democrats. The army was also called in to supervise Delaware's 1863 elections, which were boycotted by Democrats, and again in 1864.

The Democratic-controlled state legislature was bitterly opposed to the new Republican governor, and in the 1863 session, the General Assembly passed resolutions condemning the Emancipation Proclamation and President Lincoln's suspension of habeas corpus for Southern sympathizers. The legislature would go on to denounce the enlistment of Black soldiers in the army, the freeing of slaves, and the Thirteenth Amendment to the United States Constitution in 1865 which ended slavery nationwide.

Delaware's wartime Senate delegation was supportive of slavery, with Democratic Senator James A. Bayard Jr. in favor of Southern secession and Delaware's secession. Bayard resigned from office in 1864 after protesting a requirement that senators swear swear loyalty to the Union, and he was replaced by Democrat George R. Riddle, a slaveholder. Delaware's other senate seat was held by Democrat Willard Saulsbury Sr., also a slaveholder and an unapologetic white supremacist who opposed emancipation, civil rights for Black Americans, and the enlistment of Black troops in the Army. In January 1863 Saulsbury launched a drunken tirade on the Senate floor, calling President Lincoln "a weak and imbecile man," before brandishing a pistol when the Senate sergeant at arms tried to remove him from the chamber. Delaware's single at-large House seat was held by Unionist George P. Fisher (1861-1863) and Republican Nathaniel B. Smithers (1864-1865) following a Democratic boycott of the 1863 special election.

== Military actions in Delaware ==
No battles or skirmishes between Union and Confederate troops took place in Delaware. In March 1862, Federal troops seized weapons from Southern sympathizers and arrested local leaders of pro-Confederate militia companies, but these events did not result in any violence. Off the Delaware coast, Confederate commerce raiders such as the CSS Tallahassee posed a risk to shipping and destroyed Union merchant vessels.

As Robert E. Lee's forces moved north through Maryland during the summer 1863 Gettysburg Campaign, there were fears his army would move east and approach Philadelphia through Delaware, but Lee took a different route. Martial law was declared in Delaware in July 1863 by order of General Robert C. Schenck, due to the nearby presence of Lee's army and the risk of "secret traitors plotting against the public safety." There were concerns during the Valley campaigns of 1864 that Confederate cavalry raiding through Maryland might target Delaware's infrastructure, but no such attack came.

== Prisoners of war ==
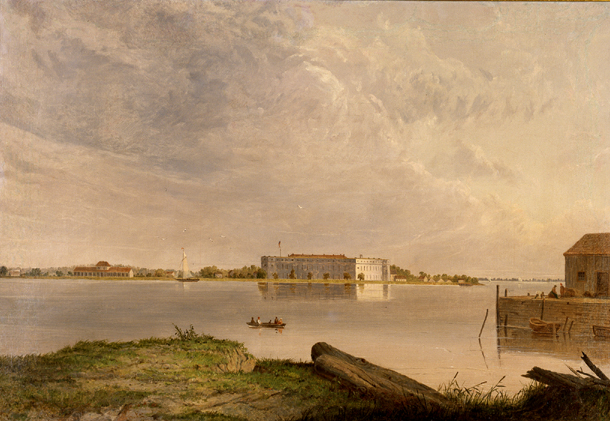
Fort Delaware, painted circa 1870 by Seth Eastman.

Fort Delaware, located on Pea Patch Island in the Delaware River, was pressed into service as an important wartime prison for Confederate prisoners of war, political prisoners, federal convicts, and privateer officers.

Prison conditions were initially "tolerable," according to researchers at the University of Delaware. In 1862 the prisoner population varied from 3,434 prisoners in July to only 123 later in the year, as the Federal and Confederate armies regularly exchanged prisoners. During the summer of 1863 the prison's population increased to 12,000 following major Confederate battlefield defeats that year and the breakdown of the exchange system. The fort held a cumulative total of almost 33,000 prisoners by the end of the war, roughly 2,500 of whom died as sanitary conditions continued to deteriorate. Half of the deaths were reportedly due to an outbreak of smallpox in 1863.

Rather than remain in the overcrowded and unhealthy prison, a number of Confederate prisoners, known as "Galvanized Yankees", volunteered to join the Union army and enlisted in the 4th Delaware Infantry Regiment and Ahl's Heavy Artillery Company.

== Reconstruction ==
The bitter opposition of Delaware Democrats towards ending slavery carried over into the postwar Reconstruction era. Following the death in office of Republican Governor William Cannon on March 1, 1865, Democratic Speaker of the state senate Gove Saulsbury assumed the office. Gove Saulsbury had been one of Cannon's most determined opponents in the legislature, and the new Governor was opposed to citizenship for newly-emancipated slaves, stating "I believe it [the Black race] should be excluded from participation with our own [white] race in political rights and privileges."

The Democrats in the state legislature held similar opinions, passing a joint resolution stating "that this General Assembly views with indignation and alarm the system of legislation now pending before Congress designed to equalize the white with the negro race." The 14th Amendment, granting the right of citizenship to Blacks, and the 15th Amendment, granting voting rights, were both rejected by Delaware but came into effect nationwide when a majority of other states ratified them.

In the postwar period, Delaware passed new laws restricting the rights of Black citizens to vote, serve on juries, and enjoy full civil rights. The state enacted its own Jim Crow law establishing legal segregation in 1875 that would not be repealed until the 1960s.

== Monuments and memorials ==
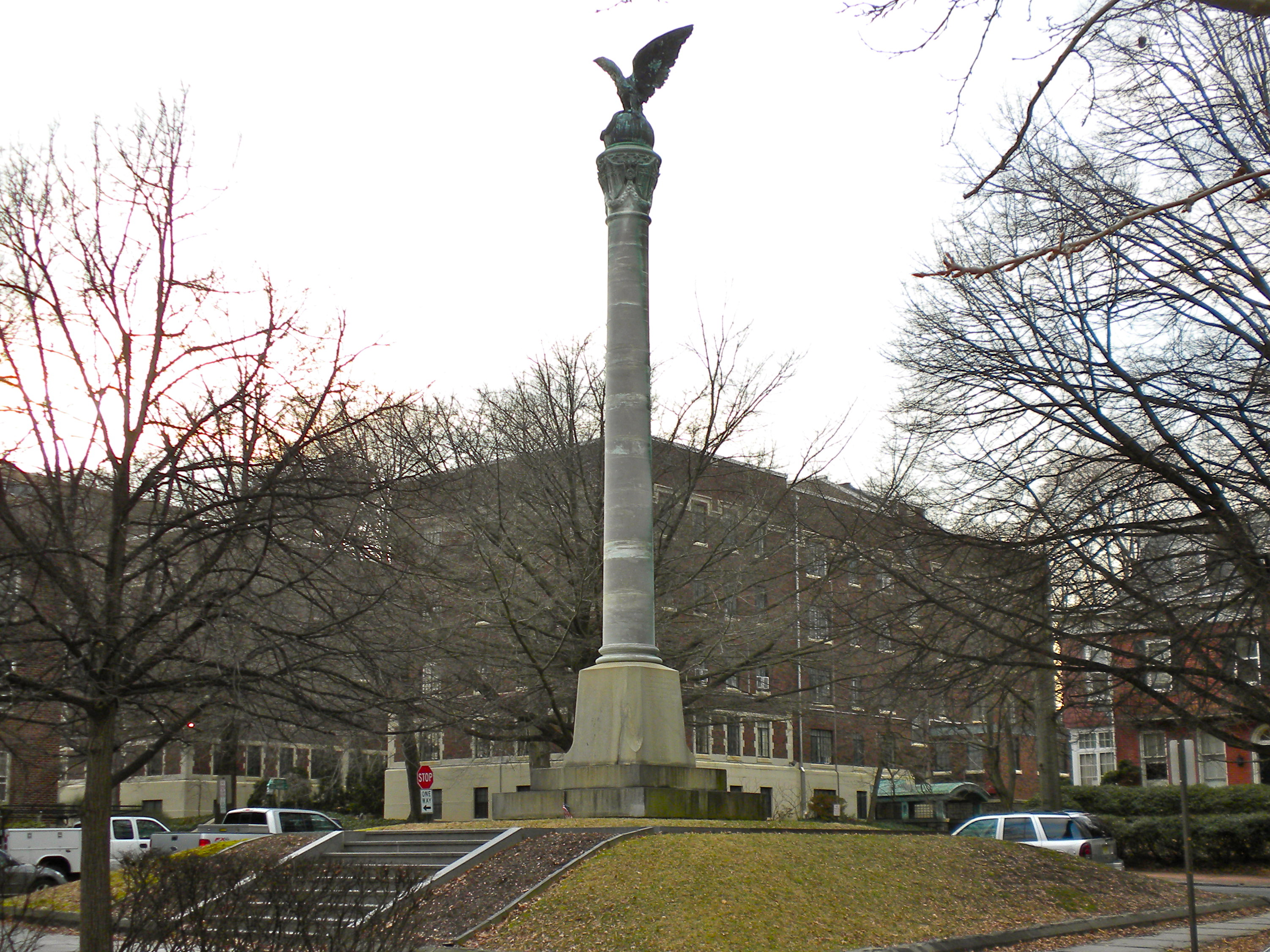
Soldiers and Sailors Monument, Wilmington, dedicated 1871.

The state's largest memorial is the Soldiers and Sailors Monument, which was dedicated in Wilmington in 1871. The column of the monument was repurposed from the now-demolished Bank of Pennsylvania building in Philadelphia, designed by architect Benjamin Henry Latrobe.

The African-American Medal of Honor Recipients Memorial in Brandywine Park in Wilmington commemorates Black soldiers, sailors, and marines who earned the Medal of Honor for their service from the Civil War to modern times.

Dupont Circle in Washington D.C. was named after Delaware's admiral Samuel Francis Du Pont, and an 1884 statue of him placed at the center of the circle was moved to Rockford Park in Wilmington in 1917. A statue of Major General Alfred Thomas Archimedes Torbert, born in Delaware, was erected in Milford in 2008.

At Antietam National Battlefield in Maryland, there are memorials commemorating the 2nd and 3rd Delaware Infantry Regiments, who took part in the September 17, 1862 battle there.

A privately-owned memorial to Delawareans who fought for the Confederacy, the Delaware Confederate Monument, is located near Georgetown. This monument has attracted controversy for flying the Confederate Battle Flag, and state funding to the local historical society that owns the memorial was revoked in 2019.

== Notable Delawareans in the Civil War ==
- Henry du Pont, head of the DuPont corporation, Major General of Delaware's militia forces.
- Henry A. du Pont, won the Medal of Honor for actions at the 1864 Battle of Cedar Creek.
- Samuel Francis Du Pont, Navy rear admiral.
- George Sykes, Major General in the Army of the Potomac.

== See also ==
- History of Delaware
- Copperhead (politics)
