= Middle Department =

American Civil War-era military district

The Middle Department was an administrative military district created by the United States Department of War early in the American Civil War to administer the troops in the Middle Atlantic states.

The department was created on March 22, 1862 by the Adjutant General's Office in Washington, D.C. It combined all Federal troops in the states of New Jersey, Delaware, Pennsylvania and the counties of Anne Arundel, Baltimore, Cecil, and Harford in Maryland, with headquarters in Baltimore, Maryland. Maj. Gen. John A. Dix was designated as its first commander.

The Middle Department was dissolved July 22, 1862, when it was renamed VIII Corps. Although no longer an official organization, the Middle Department designation continued to be used in reference to VIII Corps and the general administrative district that it originally encompassed.

== Commanders ==
- Major General John A. Dix - March 22, 1862 to June 9, 1862
- Major General John E. Wool - June 9, 1862 to July 22, 1862

== See also ==
- VIII Corps
