= Appomattox campaign order of battle: Union =

The following Union Army units and commanders fought in the Appomattox campaign of the American Civil War. Order of battle compiled from the army organization during the campaign. The Confederate order of battle is shown separately.

== Abbreviations used ==
=== Military rank ===
- LTG = Lieutenant General
- MG = Major General
- BG = Brigadier General
- Col = Colonel
- Ltc = Lieutenant Colonel
- Maj = Major
- Cpt = Captain
- Lt = Lieutenant

=== Other ===
- w = wounded
- mw = mortally wounded
- k = killed in action

== Union forces ==
LTG Ulysses S. Grant, Commanding

Staff:

- Assistant adjutant general: BG Seth Williams

Escort:

- 5th U.S. Cavalry, Companies B, F, and K: Cpt Julius W. Mason

Headquarters Guard:

- 4th U.S. Infantry: Cpt Joseph B. Collins

=== Army of the Potomac ===
MG George G.Meade

Division	Brigade	Regiments and others
Headquarters units	Provost Guard Bvt BG George N. Macy	1st Indiana Cavalry, Company K; 1st Massachusetts Cavalry, Company C: Cpt Edward A. Flint; 1st Massachusetts Cavalry, Company D: Cpt James J. Higginson; 3rd Pennsylvania Cavalry: Ltc James W. Walsh; 11th U.S. Infantry, 1st Battalion: Cpt Alfred E. Latimer; 14th U.S. Infantry, 2nd Battalion: Cpt William H. Brown
Headquarters units	Independent Brigade Bvt BG Charles H. T. Collis	1st Massachusetts Cavalry (8 companies): Maj John Tewksbury; 61st Massachusetts: Col Charles F. Walcott; 80th New York Infantry: Col Jacob B. Hardenbergh; 68th Pennsylvania: Col Andrew H. Tippin; 114th Pennsylvania: Cpt Henry M. Eddy (mw), Cpt John R. Waterhouse
Headquarters units	Headquarters Guard	3rd U.S. Infantry: Cpt Richard G. Lay
Headquarters units	Quartermaster's Guard	Independent Company, Oneida (New York) Cavalry: Cpt James E. Jenkins
Engineers	Engineer Brigade BG Henry W. Benham	15th New York Engineers (9 companies): Col Wesley Brainerd; 50th New York Engineers: Col William H. Pettes
Engineers	Other engineers	Battalion, U.S. engineers: Maj Franklin Harwood
Artillery BG Henry J. Hunt	Siege Train Bvt BG Henry L. Abbot	1st Connecticut Heavy Artillery: Maj George Ager, Maj George B. Cook; Connecticut Light Artillery, 3rd Battery: Cpt Thomas S. Gilbert
Artillery BG Henry J. Hunt	Artillery Reserve BG William Hays	Maine Light Artillery, 2nd Battery (B): Cpt Charles E. Stubbs; Maine Light Artillery, 3rd Battery (C): Cpt Ezekiel R. Mayo; Maine Light Artillery, 4th Battery (D): Cpt Charles W. White; Maine Light Artillery, 6th Battery (F): Cpt William H. Rogers; New York Light Artillery, 12th Battery: Cpt Charles A. Clark; 1st Ohio Light Artillery, Battery H: Cpt Stephen W. Dorsey; 1st Pennsylvania Light Artillery, Battery F: Lt John F. Campbell; 1st Rhode Island Light Artillery, Battery E: Lt Ezra K. Parker; Vermont Light Artillery, 3rd Battery: Cpt Romeo H. Start

==== II Corps ====
MG Andrew A. Humphreys

Division	Brigade	Regiments and others
First Division Bvt MG Nelson A. Miles	1st Brigade Col George W. Scott; Col George N. Macy	26th Michigan: Cpt Lucius H. Ives; 5th New Hampshire (battalion): Ltc Welcome A. Crafts; 2nd New York Heavy Artillery: Maj Oscar F. Hulser; 61st New York: Maj George W. Schaffer; 81st Pennsylvania: Ltc William Wilson; 140th Pennsylvania: Cpt William A. F. Stockton
First Division Bvt MG Nelson A. Miles	2nd Brigade Col Robert Nugent	28th Massachusetts (5 companies): Cpt Patrick H. Bird; 63rd New York (6 companies): Cpt William H. Terwilliger; 69th New York: Ltc James J. Smith; 88th New York (5 companies): Ltc Denis F. Burke; 4th New York Heavy Artillery: Maj Seward F. Gould
First Division Bvt MG Nelson A. Miles	3rd Brigade Bvt BG Henry J. Madill (w, April 2); Bvt BG Clinton D. MacDougall	7th New York Veteran: Ltc Anthony Pokorny; 39th New York: Col Augustus Funk (w, March 31), Maj John M. Hyde; 52nd New York: Ltc Henry M. Karples, Maj Henry P. Ritzius, Ltc Henry M. Karples; 111th New York: BG Clinton D. MacDougall; 125th New York: Ltc Joseph Hyde; 126th New York (battalion): Cpt John B. Geddis (w, April 2), Cpt I. Hart Wilder
First Division Bvt MG Nelson A. Miles	4th Brigade Bvt BG John Ramsey	64th New York: Ltc William Glenny; 66th New York: Cpt Nathaniel P. Lane; 53rd Pennsylvania: Col William M. Mintzer; 116th Pennsylvania: Maj David W. Megraw (w, March 31), Cpt John R. Weltner; 145th Pennsylvania: Cpt James H. Hamlin; 148th Pennsylvania: Cpt Alfred A. Rhinehart (w, March 31); 183rd Pennsylvania: Col George T. Egbert
Second Division BG William Hays; BG Thomas A. Smyth; Bvt MG Francis C. Barlow	1st Brigade Col William A. Olmsted	19th Maine: Col Isaac W. Starbird (w, April 7); 19th Massachusetts: Cpt Charles S. Palmer; 20th Massachusetts: Ltc Arthur R. Curtis; 7th Michigan: Ltc George W. La Point; 1st Minnesota Battalion (2 companies): Cpt Frank Houston; 59th New York (battalion): Cpt William Ludgate; 152nd New York: Maj James E. Curtiss; 184th Pennsylvania: Col John Hubler Stover; 36th Wisconsin: Col Clement Warner
Second Division BG William Hays; BG Thomas A. Smyth; Bvt MG Francis C. Barlow	2nd Brigade Col James Patrick McIvor	8th New York Heavy Artillery: Col Joel B. Baker; 155th New York: Cpt Michael Doheny; 164th New York: Cpt Timothy J. Burke; 170th New York: Cpt John Mitchell; 182nd New York: Cpt Robert Heggart
Second Division BG William Hays; BG Thomas A. Smyth; Bvt MG Francis C. Barlow	3rd Brigade BG Thomas A. Smyth (mw, April 7); Col Daniel Woodall	14th Connecticut: Cpt J. Frank Morgan; 1st Delaware: Col Daniel Woodall; 12th New Jersey: Maj Henry F. Chew; 10th New York (battalion): Ltc George F. Hopper; 108th New York: Ltc Francis E. Pierce; 4th Ohio (4 companies): Ltc Charles C. Calahan; 69th Pennsylvania: Cpt Charles McAnally; 106th Pennsylvania: Cpt John H. Gallager; 7th West Virginia: Ltc Francis W. H. Baldwin
Second Division BG William Hays; BG Thomas A. Smyth; Bvt MG Francis C. Barlow	Unattached	2nd Company, Minnesota Sharpshooters: Ltc Edward N. Schoff
Third Division Bvt MG Gershom Mott (w, April 6); BG Régis de Trobriand	1st Brigade BG Régis de Trobriand; Col Russell B. Shepherd	20th Indiana: Cpt John W. Shafer; 1st Maine Heavy Artillery: Col Russell B. Shepherd; 40th New York: Ltc Madison M. Cannon; 73rd New York: Ltc Michael W. Burns; 86th New York: Ltc Nathan H. Vincent; 124th New York: Ltc Charles H. Weygant; 99th Pennsylvania: Cpt Jacob Giller; 110th Pennsylvania: Cpt Franklin B. Stewart
Third Division Bvt MG Gershom Mott (w, April 6); BG Régis de Trobriand	2nd Brigade BG Byron R. Pierce	17th Maine: Ltc William Hobson (w, April 6); 1st Massachusetts Heavy Artillery: Maj Nathaniel Shatswell; 5th Michigan: Col John Pulford; 93rd New York: Ltc Haviland Gifford; 57th Pennsylvania: Col George Zinn; 105th Pennsylvania: Maj James Miller; 141st Pennsylvania: Ltc Joseph H. Horton
Third Division Bvt MG Gershom Mott (w, April 6); BG Régis de Trobriand	3rd Brigade Bvt BG Robert McAllister	11th Massachusetts: Ltc Charles C. Rivers; 7th New Jersey: Col Francis Price; 8th New Jersey: Maj Henry Hartford; 11th New Jersey: Ltc John Schoonover; 120th New York: Ltc Abram L. Lockwood
	Artillery Brigade Ltc John G. Hazzard	Massachusetts Light Artillery, 10th Battery: Cpt Joshua Webb Adams; 1st New Hampshire Light Artillery, Battery M: Cpt George K. Dakin; 1st New Jersey Light Artillery, Battery B: Cpt A. Judson Clark; New York Light Artillery, 11th Battery: Lt James A. Manning; 4th New York Heavy Artillery, Battery C: Cpt Richard Kennedy; 4th New York Heavy Artillery, Battery L: Lt Frank Seymour; 1st Rhode Island Light Artillery, Battery B: Lt William B. Westcott; 4th U.S. Artillery, Battery K: Cpt John W. Roder

==== V Corps ====
MG Gouverneur K. Warren
Bvt MG Charles Griffin

Escort

- 4th Pennsylvania Cavalry, Company C: Cpt Napoleon J. Horrell

Provost Guard

- 104th New York: Cpt William W. Graham

Division	Brigade	Regiments and others
First Division Bvt MG Charles Griffin; Bvt MG Joseph J. Bartlett	1st Brigade BG Joshua L. Chamberlain	185th New York: Col Gustavus Sniper; 198th Pennsylvania: BG Horatio G. Sickel (w, March 29), Maj Edwin A. Glenn (mw, April 1), Cpt John Stanton
First Division Bvt MG Charles Griffin; Bvt MG Joseph J. Bartlett	2nd Brigade Bvt BG Edgar M. Gregory	187th New York: Ltc Daniel Myers; 188th New York: Ltc Isaac Donlittle; 189th New York: Ltc Joseph G. Townsend
First Division Bvt MG Charles Griffin; Bvt MG Joseph J. Bartlett	3rd Brigade Bvt MG Joseph J. Bartlett; Bvt BG Alfred L. Pearson	1st Maine Sharpshooters: Cpt George R. Abbott; 20th Maine: Ltc Walter G. Morrill; 32nd Massachusetts: Ltc James A. Cunningham; 1st Michigan: Ltc George Lockley; 16th Michigan: Col Benjamin F. Partridge; 83rd Pennsylvania: Col Chauncey P. Rogers; 91st Pennsylvania: Ltc Eli G. Sellers; 118th Pennsylvania: Ltc Henry O'Neill; 155th Pennsylvania: BG Alfred L. Pearson, Maj John A. Cline
Second Division Bvt MG Romeyn B. Ayres	1st Brigade Bvt BG Frederick Winthrop (mw, April 1); Col James G. Grindlay; BG Joseph Hayes	5th New York: Cpt Henry Schickhardt, Ltc William F. Drum; 15th New York Heavy Artillery: Ltc Michael Wiedrich (w, April 1), Maj Louis Eiche; 140th New York: Ltc William S. Grantsynn; 146th New York: Col James G. Grindlay, Lt Henry Loomis
Second Division Bvt MG Romeyn B. Ayres	2nd Brigade Bvt BG Andrew W. Denison (w, March 31); Col Richard N. Bowerman (w, April 1); Col David L. Stanton	1st Maryland: Col David L. Stanton, Maj Robert Neely; 4th Maryland: Col Richard N. Bowerman, Maj Harrison Adreon; 7th Maryland: Ltc David T. Bennett (w, March 31), Maj Edward M. Mobley; 8th Maryland: Ltc Ernest F. M. Faehtz
Second Division Bvt MG Romeyn B. Ayres	3rd Brigade Bvt BG James Gwyn	3rd Delaware: Cpt John H. Cade; 4th Delaware: Cpt William H. Maclary (k, April 1), Ltc Moses B. Gist; 8th Delaware (3 companies): Cpt John N. Richards; 157th Pennsylvania (4 companies): Bvt Col Joseph B. Pattee; 190th Pennsylvania: Bvt Col Joseph B. Pattee; 191st Pennsylvania: Col James Carle; 210th Pennsylvania: Col William Sergeant (mw, March 31), Ltc Edward L. Witman
Third Division Bvt MG Samuel W. Crawford	1st Brigade Col John A. Kellogg	91st New York: Col Jonathan Tarbell; 6th Wisconsin: Ltc Thomas Kerr (w, March 31), Cpt Edward A. Whaley (w, April 1), Captain Lewis A. Kent; 7th Wisconsin: Ltc Hollon Richardson (w, April 1)
Third Division Bvt MG Samuel W. Crawford	2nd Brigade BG Henry Baxter	16th Maine: Col Charles W. Tilden; 39th Massachusetts: Ltc Henry M. Tremlett (w, March 31), Cpt Joseph J. Cooper; 97th New York: Ltc Rouse S. Egelston (w, April 2); 11th Pennsylvania: Maj John B. Overmyer; 107th Pennsylvania: Col Thomas F. McCoy
Third Division Bvt MG Samuel W. Crawford	3rd Brigade Bvt BG Richard Coulter	94th New York: Maj Henry H. Fish (w, March 31; k, April 1), Cpt Albert T. Morgan; 95th New York: Cpt George D. Knight; 147th New York: Maj Dennis B. Dailey (w, March 31), Cpt James A. McKinley; 56th Pennsylvania: Maj Henry A. Laycock; 88th Pennsylvania: Maj Henry A. Laycock; 121st Pennsylvania: Maj West Funk; 142nd Pennsylvania: Ltc Horatio N. Warren (w, March 31)
Third Division Bvt MG Samuel W. Crawford	Unattached	1st New York Sharpshooters Battalion: Cpt Clinton Perry
	Artillery Brigade Bvt BG Charles S. Wainwright	1st New York Light Artillery, Battery B: Cpt Robert E. Rogers; 1st New York Light Artillery, Battery D: Lt Deloss M. Johnson; 1st New York Light Artillery, Battery H: Maj Charles E. Mink; 15th New York Heavy Artillery, Company M: Cpt William D. Dickey; 4th U.S. Artillery, Battery B: Lt John Mitchell (w, March 29), Lt William P. Vose; 5th U.S. Artillery, Battery D and G: Lt Jacob B. Rawles

==== VI Corps ====
MG Horatio G. Wright

Escort

- 21st Pennsylvania Cavalry, Company E: Cpt William H. Royd, jr.

Division	Brigade	Regiments and others
First Division Bvt MG Frank Wheaton	1st Brigade Bvt BG William H. Penrose	1st and 4th New Jersey (battalion): Ltc Baldwin Hufty; 2nd New Jersey (2 companies): Cpt Adolphus Weiss; 3rd New Jersey (1 company): Cpt James H. Comings; 10th New Jersey: Maj James W. McNeely; 15th New Jersey: Maj Ebenezer W. Davis; 40th New Jersey: Col Stephen R. Gilkyson
First Division Bvt MG Frank Wheaton	2nd Brigade Bvt BG Joseph E. Hamblin	2nd Connecticut Heavy Artillery: Col James Hubbard; 65th New York: Ltc Henry C. Fisk; 121st New York: Col Egbert Olcott; 95th Pennsylvania: Ltc John Harper
First Division Bvt MG Frank Wheaton	3rd Brigade Col Oliver Edwards	37th Massachusetts: Cpt Archibald Hopkins; 49th Pennsylvania: Bvt Col Baynton J. Hickman; 82nd Pennsylvania: Col Isaac C. Bassett; 119th Pennsylvania: Ltc Gideon Clark (w, April 2), Maj William C. Gray; 2nd Rhode Island: Ltc Elisha H. Rhodes; 5th Wisconsin: Col Thomas S. Allen
Second Division Bvt MG George W. Getty	1st Brigade Col James M. Warner	62nd New York: Ltc Theodore B. Hamilton; 93rd Pennsylvania: Col Charles W. Eckman, Cpt B. Frank Hean, Col Charles W. Eckman; 98th Pennsylvania: Ltc Charles Reen (w, April 2), Cpt Bernhard Gessler; 102nd Pennsylvania: Ltc James Patchell; 139th Pennsylvania: Ltc John G. Parr, Maj James McGregor, Ltc John G. Parr
Second Division Bvt MG George W. Getty	2nd Brigade Bvt MG Lewis A. Grant (w, April 2); Ltc Amasa S. Tracy; Col Charles Mundee; Ltc Amasa S. Tracy; Bvt MG Lewis A. Grant	2nd Vermont: Ltc Amasa S. Tracy; 3rd Vermont: Col Horace W. Floyd; 4th Vermont: Cpt George H. Amidon; 5th Vermont: Ltc Ronald A. Kennedy; 6th Vermont: Maj William J. Sperry, Ltc Sumner H. Lincoln; 1st Vermont Heavy Artillery: Ltc Charles Hunsdon
Second Division Bvt MG George W. Getty	3rd Brigade Col Thomas W. Hyde	1st Maine: Ltc Stephen C. Fletcher; 43rd New York (5 companies): Ltc Charles A. Milliken; 49th New York (5 companies): Ltc Erastus D. Holt (mw, April 2), Maj George H. Selkirk; 77th New York (5 companies): Ltc David J. Caw, Cpt Charles E. Stevens; 122nd New York: Ltc Horace H. Walpole; 61st Pennsylvania: Ltc John W. Crosby (k, April 2), Col George F. Smith
Third Division BG Truman Seymour	1st Brigade Col William S. Truex	14th New Jersey: Ltc Jacob J. Janeway; 106th New York: Col Andrew N. McDonald, Ltc Alvah W. Briggs, Col Andrew N. McDonald; 151st New York (5 companies): Ltc Charles Bogardus; 87th Pennsylvania: Cpt James Tearney; 10th Vermont: Ltc George B. Damon
Third Division BG Truman Seymour	2nd Brigade Bvt BG J. Warren Keifer	6th Maryland: Maj Clifton K. Prentiss (mw, April 2); 9th New York Heavy Artillery: Ltc James W. Snyder; 110th Ohio: Col Otho H. Binkley, Cpt William D. Shellenberger (w, April 2), Col Otho H. Binkley; 122nd Ohio: Ltc Charles M. Cornyn; 126th Ohio: Col Benjamin F. Smith; 67th Pennsylvania: Maj William G. Williams; 138th Pennsylvania: Col Matthew R. McClennan
	Artillery Brigade Maj Andrew Cowan	1st New Jersey Light Artillery, Battery A: Cpt Augustine N. Parsons; New York Light Artillery, 1st Battery: Cpt Orsamus R. Van Etten; New York Light Artillery, 3rd Battery: Maj William A. Harn; 9th New York Heavy Artillery, Company L: Cpt S. Augustus Howe; 1st Rhode Island Light Artillery, Battery G: Maj George W. Adams; 1st Rhode Island Light Artillery, Battery H: Cpt Crawford Allen, jr.; 5th U.S. Artillery, Battery E: Lt John R. Brinckle; 1st Vermont Heavy Artillery, Company D: Cpt Charles J. Lewis

==== IX Corps ====
MG John G. Parke

Provost Guard

- 79th New York: Maj Andrew D. Baird

Division	Brigade	Regiments and others
First Division Bvt MG Orlando B. Willcox	1st Brigade Col Samuel Harriman	8th Michigan: Maj Richard N. Doyle; 27th Michigan: Col Charles Waite; 109th New York: Ltc Colwert K. Pier; 51st Pennsylvania: Col William J. Bolton; 37th Wisconsin: Ltc John Green; 38th Wisconsin: Col James Bintliff, Maj Robert N. Roberts
First Division Bvt MG Orlando B. Willcox	2nd Brigade Col Ralph Ely	1st Michigan Sharpshooters: Ltc (Bvt Col) Asahel W. Nichols (w, April 2), Cpt James DeLand (w, April 2), Cpt Ira Evans, Maj (Bvt Ltc) Edward J. Buckbee; 2nd Michigan: Cpt John C. Boughton; 20th Michigan: Cpt Albert A. Day; 46th New York: Ltc Adolph Becker; 60th Ohio: Ltc Martin P. Avery; 50th Pennsylvania: Maj Samuel K. Schwenk
First Division Bvt MG Orlando B. Willcox	3rd Brigade Col James Bintliff; Ltc Gilbert P. Robinson	3rd Maryland (4 companies): Ltc Gilbert P. Robinson, Cpt Joseph F. Carter; 29th Massachusetts: Cpt John M. Deane; 57th Massachusetts: Cpt Albert W. Cook; 59th Massachusetts: Maj Ezra P. Gould; 18th New Hampshire: Ltc Joseph M. Clough; 14th New York Heavy Artillery: Maj George M. Randall; 100th Pennsylvania: Maj Norman J. Maxwell
First Division Bvt MG Orlando B. Willcox	Acting Engineers	17th Michigan: Ltc Frederick W. Swift
Second Division Bvt MG Robert B. Potter (w, April 2); BG Simon G. Griffin	1st Brigade Bvt BG John I. Curtin	35th Massachusetts: Col Sumner Carruth; 36th Massachusetts: Ltc Thaddeus L. Barker; 58th Massachusetts: Ltc John C. Whiton; 39th New Jersey: Col Abram C. Wildrick; 51st New York: Cpt Thomas B. Marsh; 45th Pennsylvania: Cpt Roland C. Cheeseman (w, April 2), Col Theodore Gregg; 48th Pennsylvania: Col George W. Gowan (k, April 2), Ltc Isaac F. Brannon; 7th Rhode Island: Col Percy Daniels
Second Division Bvt MG Robert B. Potter (w, April 2); BG Simon G. Griffin	2nd Brigade BG Simon Goodell Griffin; Col Walter Harriman	31st Maine: Ltc Edward L. Getchell (w, April 2), Cpt Ebenezer S. Kyes; 2nd Maryland: Ltc Benjamin F. Taylor; 56th Massachusetts: Maj Zabdiel B. Adams, Col Stephen M. Weld, Jr.; 6th New Hampshire: Ltc Phin P. Bixby; 9th New Hampshire: Cpt John B. Cooper; 11th New Hampshire: Col Walter Harriman, Cpt Hollis O. Dudley; 179th New York: Col William M. Gregg (w, April 2), Maj Albert A. Terrill; 186th New York: Col Bradley Winslow (w, April 2), Ltc E. Jay Marsh; 17th Vermont: Maj Lyman E. Knapp (w, April 2), Col Francis V. Randall
Third Division BG John F. Hartranft	1st Brigade Ltc William H. H. McCall; Col Alfred B. McCalmont	200th Pennsylvania: Maj Jacob Rehrer, Ltc William H. H. McCall; 208th Pennsylvania: Ltc Mish T. Heintzelman; 209th Pennsylvania: Ltc George W. Frederick
Third Division BG John F. Hartranft	2nd Brigade Col Joseph A. Mathews	205th Pennsylvania: Maj B. Mortimer Morrow (w, April 2), Cpt Joseph G. Holmes; 207th Pennsylvania: Col Robert C. Cox; 211th Pennsylvania: Col Levi A. Dodd
	Artillery Brigade Bvt BG John C. Tidball	Maine Light Artillery, 7th Battery: Cpt Adelbert B. Twitchell; Massachusetts Light Artillery, 5th Battery: Maj Charles A. Phillips; Massachusetts Light Artillery, 9th Battery: Cpt Richard S. Milton; Massachusetts Light Artillery, 11th Battery: Cpt Edward J. Jones; Massachusetts Light Artillery, 14th Battery: Cpt Joseph W. B. Wright; New Jersey Light Artillery, 3rd Battery: Maj Christian Woerner; 1st New York Light Artillery, Battery C: Cpt David F. Ritchie; 1st New York Light Artillery, Battery E: Lt George H. Barse; 1st New York Light Artillery, Battery G: Cpt Samuel A. McClellan; 1st New York Light Artillery, Battery L: Lt Dewitt M. Perine, Maj George Breck; New York Light Artillery, 19th Battery: Cpt Edward W. Rogers; New York Light Artillery, 27th Battery: Cpt John B. Eaton; New York Light Artillery, 34th Battery: Maj Jacob Roemer; 1st Pennsylvania Light Artillery, Battery B: Cpt William McClelland; Pennsylvania Light Artillery, Battery D: Cpt Samuel H. Rhoads; 5th U.S. Artillery, Battery C and Battery I: Lt Valentine H. Stone
	Cavalry	2nd Pennsylvania Cavalry: Col William W. Sanders

==== Cavalry ====
Division	Brigade	Regiments and others
2nd Division MG George Crook	1st Brigade Bvt MG Henry E. Davies, Jr.	1st New Jersey Cavalry: Col Hugh H. Janeway (k, April 5), Maj Walter R. Robbins; 10th New York Cavalry: Col Mathew Henry Avery; 24th New York Cavalry: Col Walter C. Newberry (w, March 31), Ltc Melzer Richards (mw, April 5), Maj William A. Snyder; 1st Pennsylvania Cavalry (5 companies): Maj Hampton S. Thomas (w, April 5); 2nd U.S. Artillery, Battery A: Lt James H. Lord
2nd Division MG George Crook	2nd Brigade Bvt BG John Irvin Gregg (c, April 7); Col Samuel B. M. Young	4th Pennsylvania Cavalry: Ltc Alender P. Duncan; 8th Pennsylvania Cavalry (8 companies): Ltc William A. Corrie; 16th Pennsylvania Cavalry: Ltc John K. Robison (w, April 7), Maj William H. Fry; 21st Pennsylvania Cavalry: Col Oliver B. Knowles; 1st U.S. Artillery, Battery H and I: Lt Chandler P. Eakin
2nd Division MG George Crook	3rd Brigade Bvt BG Charles H. Smith	1st Maine Cavalry: Ltc Jonathan P. Cilley; 2nd New York Mounted Rifles: Maj Paul Chadbourne (w, March 31), Col John Fisk; 6th Ohio Cavalry: Cpt Matthew H. Cryer; 13th Ohio Cavalry: Ltc Stephen R. Clark

=== Army of the James ===
MG Edward O. C. Ord

Chief of Staff: Bvt BG Theodore Read (mw, April 6)

Division	Brigade	Regiments and others
Headquarters units	Headquarters guards	3rd Pennsylvania Heavy Artillery, Company D: Cpt Edwin A. Evans; 3rd Pennsylvania Heavy Artillery, Company I: Cpt Osbourn Wattson
Headquarters units	Engineers	1st New York: Col James F. Hall
Headquarters units	Pontoniers	3rd Massachusetts Heavy Artillery, Company I: Cpt John Pickering, jr.
Headquarters units	Unattached Cavalry	4th Massachusetts Cavalry (Companies I, L, and M): Col Francis Washburn (mw, April 6); 5th Massachusetts Cavalry (colored): Col Charles F. Adams, jr.; 7th New York Cavalry (1st Mounted Rifles): Col Edwin V. Sumner, Jr.

==== Defenses of Bermuda Hundred ====
MG George L. Hartsuff

Division	Brigade	Regiments and others
Infantry Division Bvt MG Edward Ferrero	1st Brigade Bvt BG Gilbert H. McKibbin	41st New York: Ltc Detlev von Einsiedel; 103rd New York: Cpt William Redlick; 2nd Pennsylvania Heavy Artillery: Maj Benjamin F. Winger; 104th Pennsylvania: Ltc Theophilus Kephart
Infantry Division Bvt MG Edward Ferrero	2nd Brigade Col George C. Kibbe	6th New York Heavy Artillery: Ltc Stephen D. Baker; 10th New York Heavy Artillery: Ltc G. de Peyster Arden
Infantry Division Bvt MG Edward Ferrero	Artillery	New York Light Artillery, 33rd Battery: Cpt Alger M. Wheeler
Separate Brigade BG Joseph B. Carr	Fort Pocahontas, Virginia Ltc Ashbel W. Angel	38th New Jersey (4 companies): Maj William H. Tantum; 20th New York Cavalry, Company D: Cpt Wayland F. Ford; 16th New York Heavy Artillery, Companies E and H: Cpt Henry C. Thompson; 184th New York, Company I: Cpt George Wetmore
Separate Brigade BG Joseph B. Carr	Harrison's Landing, Virginia Col Wardwell G. Robinson	184th New York: Ltc William P. McKinley; 1st U.S. Colored Cavalry, Company I: Lt Horace Hudson
Separate Brigade BG Joseph B. Carr	Fort Powhatan, Virginia Col William J. Sewell	38th New Jersey (6 companies): Col William J. Sewell; 20th New York Cavalry, Company F: Lt John E. Pollard; 3rd Pennsylvania Heavy Artillery (detachment): Lt Frederick Grill; 1st U.S. Colored Cavalry, Company E: Cpt Charles W. Emerson
	Artillery Bvt BG Henry L. Abbot	13th New York Heavy Artillery, Companies A and H: Cpt William Pendrell; New York Light Artillery, 7th Battery: Lt Martin V. McIntyre; 3rd Pennsylvania Heavy Artillery, Company E: Cpt Erskine H. Miles; 3rd Pennsylvania Heavy Artillery, Company M: Lt Sylvester W. Marshall

==== XXIV Corps ====
MG John Gibbon

Headquarters Guard
Cpt Charles E. Thomas

- 4th Massachusetts Cavalry, Company F: Cpt Joseph J. Baker
- 4th Massachusetts Cavalry, Company K: Cpt Charles E. Thomas

Division	Brigade	Regiments and others
First Division BG Robert S. Foster	1st Brigade Col Thomas O. Osborn	39th Illinois: Cpt Homer A. Plympton; 62nd Ohio: Ltc Henry R. West (w, April 6), Maj Thomas J. Platt; 67th Ohio: Col Alvin C. Voris; Detachment of the 85th Pennsylvania: Lt Absalom S. Dial; 199th Pennsylvania: Col James C. Briscoe
First Division BG Robert S. Foster	3rd Brigade Col George B. Dandy	10th Connecticut: Ltc Ellsworth D. S. Goodyear (w, April 2), Cpt Francis G. Hickerson; 11th Maine: Ltc Jonathan A. Hill, Maj Charles P. Baldwin (w, April 1), Ltc Jonathan A. Hill (w, April 9), Cpt Henry C. Adams; 24th Massachusetts: Cpt Thomas F. Edmands; 100th New York: Maj James H. Dandy (k, April 2), Cpt Edwin Nichols; 206th Pennsylvania: Col Hugh J. Brady
First Division BG Robert S. Foster	4th Brigade Col Harrison S. Fairchild	8th Maine: Ltc Edward A. True, Cpt Edward H. Reynolds; 89th New York: Maj Frank W. Tremain (k, April 2), Cpt William Dobie; 148th New York: Col John B. Murray; 158th New York: Ltc William H. McNary, Maj Hyron Kalt; 55th Pennsylvania: Cpt George H. Hill
Third Division BG Charles Devens	1st Brigade Col Edward H. Ripley	11th Connecticut: Maj Charles Warren; 13th New Hampshire: Ltc Normand Smith; 81st New York: Cpt Matthew T. Betton; 98th New York: Ltc William Kreutzer; 139th New York: Maj Theodore Miller; 19th Wisconsin: Maj Samuel K. Vaughan
Third Division BG Charles Devens	2nd Brigade Col Michael T. Donohoe	8th Connecticut: Maj William M. Pratt; 5th Maryland: Ltc William W. Bamberger; 10th New Hampshire: Cpt Warren M. Kelley; 12th New Hampshire: Ltc Thomas E. Barker; 96th New York: Maj George W. Hindes; 118th New York: Ltc Levi S. Dominy; 9th Vermont: Ltc Valentine G. Barney
Third Division BG Charles Devens	3rd Brigade Col Samuel H. Roberts	21st Connecticut: Ltc James F. Brown; 40th Massachusetts: Ltc John Pollack; 2nd New Hampshire: Ltc Joab N. Patterson; 58th Pennsylvania: Ltc Cecil Clay; 188th Pennsylvania: Ltc George K. Bowen
Independent Division Bvt MG John W. Turner	1st Brigade Ltc Andrew Potter	34th Massachusetts: Cpt Frank T. Leach; 116th Ohio: Ltc Wilbert B. Teters; 123rd Ohio: Ltc Horace Kellogg
Independent Division Bvt MG John W. Turner	2nd Brigade Col William B. Curtis	23rd Illinois: Cpt Patrick M. Ryan; 54th Pennsylvania: Ltc Albert P. Moulton; 12th West Virginia: Cpt Erastus G. Bartlett
Independent Division Bvt MG John W. Turner	3rd Brigade BG Thomas M. Harris	10th West Virginia: Cpt Marshal W. Coburn; 11th West Virginia: Maj Michael A. Ayers; 15th West Virginia: Ltc John W. Holliday
	Artillery Maj Charles C. Abell	3rd New York Light Artillery, Battery E: Cpt George E. Ashby; 3rd New York Light Artillery, Battery H: Cpt Enoch Jones; 3rd New York Light Artillery, Battery K: Cpt James R. Angel; 3rd New York Light Artillery, Battery M: Cpt John H. Howell; New York Light Artillery, 17th Battery: Cpt George T. Anthony; 1st Pennsylvania Light Artillery, Battery A: Cpt William Stitt; 1st Rhode Island Light Artillery, Battery F: Lt Charles E. Guild; 1st U.S. Artillery, Battery B: Cpt Samuel S. Elder; 4th U.S. Artillery, Battery L: Lt Henry C. Hasbrouck; 5th U.S. Artillery, Battery A: Lt Charles P. Muhlenberg; 5th U.S. Artillery, Battery F: Lt Henry B. Beecher

==== XXV Corps ====
MG Godfrey Weitzel

Provost Guard

- 4th Massachusetts Cavalry, Companies E & H: Maj Atherton H. Stevens, Jr.

Division	Brigade	Regiments and others
First Division Bvt MG August V. Kautz	1st Brigade Bvt BG Alonzo G. Draper	22nd U.S. Colored Troops: Ltc Ira C. Terry; 36th U.S. Colored Troops: Ltc Benjamin F. Pratt; 38th U.S. Colored Troops: Col Robert M. Hall; 118th U.S. Colored Troops: Col John C. Moon
First Division Bvt MG August V. Kautz	2nd Brigade BG Edward A. Wild	29th Connecticut (Colored): Col William B. Wooster; 9th U.S. Colored Troops: Col Thomas Bayley; 115th U.S. Colored Troops: Col Robert H. Earnest; 117th U.S. Colored Troops: Col Lewis G. Brown
First Division Bvt MG August V. Kautz	3rd Brigade BG Henry G. Thomas	19th U.S. Colored Troops: Col Joseph G. Perkins; 23rd U.S. Colored Troops: Ltc Marshall L. Dempcy; 43rd U.S. Colored Troops: Col Stephen B. Yeoman; 114th U.S. Colored Troops: Ltc Thomas D. Sedgwick
First Division Bvt MG August V. Kautz	Attached Brigade Bvt BG Charles S. Russell	10th U.S. Colored Troops: Ltc Edward H. Powell; 28th U.S. Colored Troops: Ltc Thomas H. Logan
First Division Bvt MG August V. Kautz	Cavalry	2nd U.S. Colored Troops Cavalry: Col George W. Cole
Second Division BG William Birney	1st Brigade Col James Shaw, Jr.	7th U.S. Colored Troops: Ltc Oscar E. Pratt; 109th U.S. Colored Troops: Col Orion A. Bartholomew; 116th U.S. Colored Troops: Ltc George H. Laird
Second Division BG William Birney	2nd Brigade Col Ulysses Doubleday	8th U.S. Colored Troops: Col Samuel C. Armstrong; 41st U.S. Colored Troops: Col Llewellyn F. Haskell; 45th U.S. Colored Troops: Maj Theodore C. Glazier; 127th U.S. Colored Troops: Ltc James Givin
Second Division BG William Birney	3rd Brigade Col William W. Woodward	29th U.S. Colored Troops: Col Clark E. Royce; 31st U.S. Colored Troops: Col Henry C. Ward
	Artillery Brigade Cpt Loomis L. Langdon	Connecticut Light Artillery, 1st Battery: Cpt James B. Clinton; New Jersey Light Artillery, 4th Battery: Cpt Charles R. Doane; New Jersey Light Artillery, 5th Battery: Cpt Zenas C. Warren; 1st Pennsylvania Light Artillery, Battery E: Cpt Henry Y. Wildey; 3rd Rhode Island Light Artillery, Battery C: Cpt Martin S. James; 1st U.S. Artillery, Battery D: Lt Redmond Tully; 1st U.S. Artillery, Battery M: Lt Egbert W. Olcott; 4th U.S. Artillery, Battery D: Cpt Frederick M. Follett

==== Cavalry ====
Division	Brigade	Regiments and others
Cavalry Division BG Ranald S. Mackenzie	1st Brigade Col Robert M. West	5th Pennsylvania Cavalry: Ltc Chistopher Kleinz; 20th New York Cavalry, Company G: Cpt Thomas H. Butler; 20th New York Cavalry (8 companies): Ltc David M. Evans
Cavalry Division BG Ranald S. Mackenzie	2nd Brigade Col Samuel P. Spear (w, April 1); Col Andrew W. Evans	1st District of Columbia Cavalry (battalion): Maj J. Stannard Baker; 1st Maryland Cavalry: Col Andrew W. Evans; 11th Pennsylvania Cavalry: Ltc Franklin A. Stratton
Cavalry Division BG Ranald S. Mackenzie	Artillery	Wisconsin Light Artillery, 4th Battery: Cpt Dorman L. Noggle

=== Army of the Shenandoah ===
MG Philip H. Sheridan

Chief of staff: Col James Forsyth

==== Cavalry Corps ====
MG Wesley Merritt

Division	Brigade	Regiments and others
First Division BG Thomas C. Devin	1st Brigade Col Peter Stagg	1st Michigan Cavalry: Ltc George R. Maxwell (w, April 1), Cpt Edward L. Negus; 5th Michigan Cavalry: Ltc Smith H. Hastings; 6th Michigan Cavalry: Ltc Harvey H. Vinton; 7th Michigan Cavalry: Ltc George G. Briggs
First Division BG Thomas C. Devin	2nd Brigade Col Charles L. Fitzhugh	6th New York Cavalry: Maj Harrison White; 9th New York Cavalry: Maj James R. Dinnin; 19th New York Cavalry (1st Dragoons): Maj Howard M. Smith; 17th Pennsylvania Cavalry: Ltc Coe Durland; 20th Pennsylvania Cavalry: Ltc Gabriel Middleton
First Division BG Thomas C. Devin	3rd (Reserve) Brigade BG Alfred Gibbs	2nd Massachusetts Cavalry: Col Caspar Crowninshield; 6th Pennsylvania Cavalry (6 companies): Col Charles L. Leiper; 1st U.S. Cavalry: Cpt Richard S. C. Lord; 5th U.S. Cavalry: Cpt Thomas Drummond (k, April 1), Lt Gustavus Urban; 6th U.S. Cavalry: Maj Robert M. Morris
First Division BG Thomas C. Devin	Artillery	4th U.S. Artillery, Battery C & Battery E: Cpt Marcus P. Miller
Third Division Bvt MG George A. Custer	1st Brigade Col Alexander C. M. Pennington Jr.	1st Connecticut Cavalry: Col Brayton Ives; 3rd New Jersey Cavalry: Ltc William P. Robeson, Jr. (w, April 1); 2nd New York Cavalry: Col Alanson M. Randol; 2nd Ohio Cavalry: Cpt Albert Barnitz
Third Division Bvt MG George A. Custer	2nd Brigade Col William Wells	8th New York Cavalry: Maj James Bliss; 15th New York Cavalry: Col John J. Coppinger; 1st Vermont Cavalry: Ltc Josiah Hall
Third Division Bvt MG George A. Custer	3rd Brigade Col Henry Capehart	1st New York Cavalry (Lincoln): Ltc Jenyns C. Battersby; 1st West Virginia Cavalry: Maj Shesh B. Howe (k, April 8), Ltc Charles E. Capehart; 2nd West Virginia Cavalry (7 companies): Ltc James Allen; 3rd West Virginia Cavalry: Maj John S. Witcher
