= John Green (Wisconsin politician) =

American politician

Member of the Wisconsin State Assembly from the Iowa 2nd district
- In office January 7, 1867 – January 6, 1868
- Preceded by: James Spensley
- Succeeded by: Jefferson Rewey

Personal details
- Born: 1834 Scotland, UK
- Died: July 17, 1877 (aged 42–43) Middleton, Wisconsin, U.S.
- Resting place: Forest Hill Cemetery, Madison, Wisconsin

Military service
- Allegiance: United States
- Branch/service: United States Army; Union Army
- Years of service: 1864–1865
- Rank: Colonel, USV
- Commands: 37th Reg. Wis. Vol. Infantry
- Battles/wars: American Civil War: Siege of Petersburg

John Green (1834 – July 17, 1877) was a Scottish American immigrant, merchant, and politician. He served one term in the Wisconsin State Assembly (1867), and was a Union Army officer in the American Civil War.

== Biography ==
Green was born in Scotland and emigrated to the United States with his parents and his nine siblings.

In 1864, he organized a company of volunteers for the Union Army and was mustered into the 37th Wisconsin Infantry Regiment as the captain of Company C. He was injured while in the trenches in the Siege of Petersburg on June 17, 1864, and never fully recovered. He was promoted to major on October 19, 1864, and was promoted to colonel in July 1865, after the war was technically ended.

After the war, he served one term in the Wisconsin State Assembly, representing southern Iowa County, and later worked as a merchant in Middleton, Wisconsin.

He died July 17, 1877, after a long illness.

Military offices
Preceded by Col. Samuel Harriman	Command of the 37th Wisconsin Infantry Regiment; July 21, 1865 – July 27, 1865	Regiment disbanded
Wisconsin State Assembly
Preceded by James Spensley	Member of the Wisconsin State Assembly from the Iowa 2nd district January 7, 1867 – January 6, 1868	Succeeded by Jefferson Rewey
