= Charles Tanner =

Charles Tanner may refer to:

- Charles Albert Tanner (1887–1970), politician in Manitoba, Canada
- Charles R. Tanner (1896–1974), American science fiction and fantasy author
- Charles Kearns Deane Tanner, member of parliament for Mid Cork, 1885–1901
- Charles Elliott Tanner (1857–1946), Canadian politician
- Charles Tanner (herpetologist) (1911–1996); see Coastal taipan
- Charles M. Tanner (1919–2006), screenwriter and playwright
- Charles B. Tanner (1842–1911), American soldier and Medal of Honor recipeint

== See also ==
- Charlie Tanner, one of the Kyle XY characters
- Chuck Tanner (1928–2011), American professional baseball player and manager
