= Cedarhurst =

Cedarhurst may refer to:

- Cedarhurst, New York, a village in Nassau County, New York
- Cedarhurst (LIRR station), a railroad station in the village
- Cedarhurst, also known as Cordenio Severance House, a historic mansion in Minnesota
- Cedarhurst, a historic Gothic Revival residence also known as the Sherwood Bonner House in the East Holly Springs Historic District

== See also ==
- Cedarhurst Cut-off, a former rail line
- Cedarhurst School, in Hamden, Connecticut
