= Bernard McCarren =

American soldier

- Born: c. 1831; Ireland
- Died: June 20, 1870 (aged 40); Wilmington, Delaware
- Burial place: All Saints Cemetery, Wilmington, Delaware
- Military career
- Allegiance: United States of America
- Branch: United States Army
- Rank: Corporal
- Units: Company C, 1st Delaware Infantry
- Conflicts: Battle of Gettysburg; American Civil War
- Awards: Medal of Honor

Bernard McCarren (c. 1831 – June 20, 1870) was an American soldier who fought with the Union Army in the American Civil War. McCarren received his country's highest award for bravery during combat, the Medal of Honor, for actions taken on July 3, 1863 during the Battle of Gettysburg.

== Civil War service ==
At the onset of the Civil War, McCarren enlisted in Company H of the Irish-American three-months regiment, the 24th Pennsylvania under Thomas Alfred Smyth. After this three month enlistment he joined the 1st Delaware Infantry.

In September 1861, McCarren was promoted to the rank of corporal. He fought in multiple battles including the Battle of Chantilly, Battle of Fredericksburg, and most notably, the Battle of Gettysburg where McCarren earned the Medal of Honor. On the third day of this battle, McCarren captured the colors of the 13th Alabama in a counterattack against Pickett's Charge.

== Medal of Honor citation ==
The President of the United States of America, in the name of Congress, takes pleasure in presenting the Medal of Honor to Private Bernard McCarren, United States Army, for extraordinary heroism on 3 July 1863, while serving with Company C, 1st Delaware Infantry, in action at Gettysburg, Pennsylvania, for capture of flag.

== Personal life ==
McCarren married Mary Ann Traynor in 1855 with whom he had two children. He died in 1870 of dysentery.

A division of the Ancient Order of Hibernians located in Newark, Delaware is named after McCarren.
