= Daniel Woodall =

- Born: June 6, 1841; Dover, Delaware
- Died: August 2, 1880 (aged 39); Williamsburg, Virginia
- Burial place: Old Drawyers Presbyterian Churchyard, Odessa, Delaware
- Military career
- Allegiance: United States; Union
- Branch: United States Army; Union Army
- Service years: 1861–1865
- Rank: Colonel; Brevet Brigadier General
- Commands: 3rd Brigade—2nd Division—II Corps; 1st Delaware Infantry Regiment; 39th New York Infantry Regiment
- Conflicts: American Civil War: Battle of Antietam; Battle of Fredericksburg; Battle of Chancellorsville; Battle of Bristoe Station; Mine Run Campaign; Battle of the Wilderness; Battle of Spotsylvania Courthouse; Battle of Cold Harbor; Siege of Petersburg; Appomattox Campaign
- Other work: Internal Revenue Service assessor

Daniel Woodall (June 6, 1841 – August 2, 1880) was an American Union army officer during the period of the American Civil War. He served in the 1st Delaware Infantry Regiment, and fought in the Eastern Theater.

Daniel Woodall was born on June 6, 1841, in Dover, Delaware. Woodall worked as a civil engineer when the American Civil War erupted. Volunteering for the 1st Delaware Infantry Regiment, a volunteer unit mustered for 3 months of service in early 1861, he was commissioned a second lieutenant of Company H. When the regiment's enlistment term ended in August it was rebuilt in Wilmington for a service time of 3 years. As the regimental officers were to be appointed again Woodall was named Captain of Company F on September 28, 1861. The regiment was assigned to the II Corps of the Army of the Potomac; for service in the Eastern Theater. Leading his men into the Battle of Antietam on September 17, 1862, Woodall was shot in the arm. After the Battle of Fredericksburg Woodall was promoted to major on December 30, 1862.

In the Battle of Chancellorsville on May 3, 1863, Woodall was wounded again, this time by an artillery shell hitting his left leg calf. Being on convalescence leave until late July he missed the Battle of Gettysburg. On July 30, 1863 Woodall was detached from the regiment and temporarily took command of the 39th New York Infantry Regiment that was attached to the same brigade. At the Battle of Bristoe Station Major Woodall, serving with his Delawarians again, led half of the regiment as brigade skirmishers and was praised by his brigade (and regiment) commander, Colonel Thomas Alfred Smyth.

Woodall was promoted to lieutenant colonel on November 5, 1863 and led the regiment into the Mine Run Campaign. On court martial duty in February 1864, he returned to fight in the Battle of the Wilderness and the Battle of Spotsylvania Courthouse. He was shot through the foot at Spotsylvania but returned to command his regiment during the Battle of Cold Harbor and the Siege of Petersburg.

When Smyth was promoted to brigadier general Woodall became colonel of the 1st Delaware, which he actually commanded for nearly a year already; and he was promoted on December 23, 1864. He was in brigade command during parts of the Appomattox Campaign. He was mustered out of the volunteers with his regiment on July 12. At this time Woodall was one of the only four original officers from 1861 still serving with the regiment.

On January 13, 1866, President Andrew Johnson nominated Wildrick for appointment to the grade of brevet brigadier general of volunteers for gallant and meritorious service in the War, to rank from June 15, 1865, and the United States Senate confirmed the appointment on March 12, 1866.

After the war Woodall moved to Williamsburg, Virginia, where he was appointed as district assessor for the Internal Revenue Service. When the office was abolished in 1872 he became a farmer. On August 2, 1880, aged just 39, he died unexpectedly on his farm. Woodall was buried on Old Drawyers Presbyterian Churchyard at Odessa, Delaware.

== Sources & References ==
- Murphey, Rev. Thomas G. (1866). Four years in the War - The History of the First Regiment of Delaware Veteran Volunteers (Infantry). Philadelphia, PA: James C. Claxton.
- Eicher, John H.; David J. Eicher (2001). Civil War High Commands. Stanford University Press. ISBN 0-8047-3641-3.
- U.S. War Department; The War of the Rebellion : a compilation of the official records of the Union and Confederate armies.; Series I, Washington, D.C.; 1880-1898

== See also ==
- List of American Civil War brevet generals (Union)
