= Henry F. Chew =

American colonel

Henry Franklin Chew
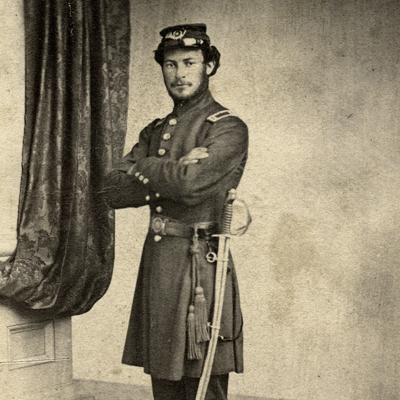
- Born: December 8, 1837; Salem, New Jersey, U.S.
- Died: May 29, 1918 (aged 80); New York City, U.S.
- Burial place: Harleigh Cemetery, Camden, New Jersey, U.S.
- Spouse: Marietta Fogg (m. 1868–1918)
- Military career
- Allegiance: United States (Union)
- Branch: United States Army (Union Army)
- Service years: 1850s–1865
- Rank: Lieutenant Colonel
- Commands: 12th New Jersey Infantry Regiment
- Conflicts: American Civil War: Chancellorsville campaign; Battle of Chancellorsville; Gettysburg campaign; Battle of Gettysburg; Overland Campaign; Battle of the Wilderness (WIA); Siege of Petersburg; Appomattox campaign; Battle of Appomattox Court House

Henry Franklin Chew (December 8, 1837 – May 29, 1918) was an American colonel who commanded the 12th New Jersey Infantry Regiment during the American Civil War and was known for his service during the Battle of Gettysburg.

== Biography ==
=== Early years ===
Henry was born on December 8, 1837. He attended the Friends' Academy and then became a wheelwright and a specialty carpenter before enlisting in the United States Army in his twenties.

=== American Civil War ===
Chew enlisted on April 25, 1861, as an ensign on the 4th New Jersey Infantry Regiment and was promoted to first lieutenant on June 9 before being mustered out on July 31. He was later re-enlisted on November 12, 1861, and made captain of the 9th New Jersey Infantry Regiment but resigned again on March 9, 1862, before re-enlisting again on September 4, 1862, as the captain and commander of the 12th New Jersey Infantry Regiment. Chew and the 12th New Jersey would first experience active military combat at the Battle of Chancellorsville, and he was praised for his performance during the battle.

=== Battle of Gettysburg ===
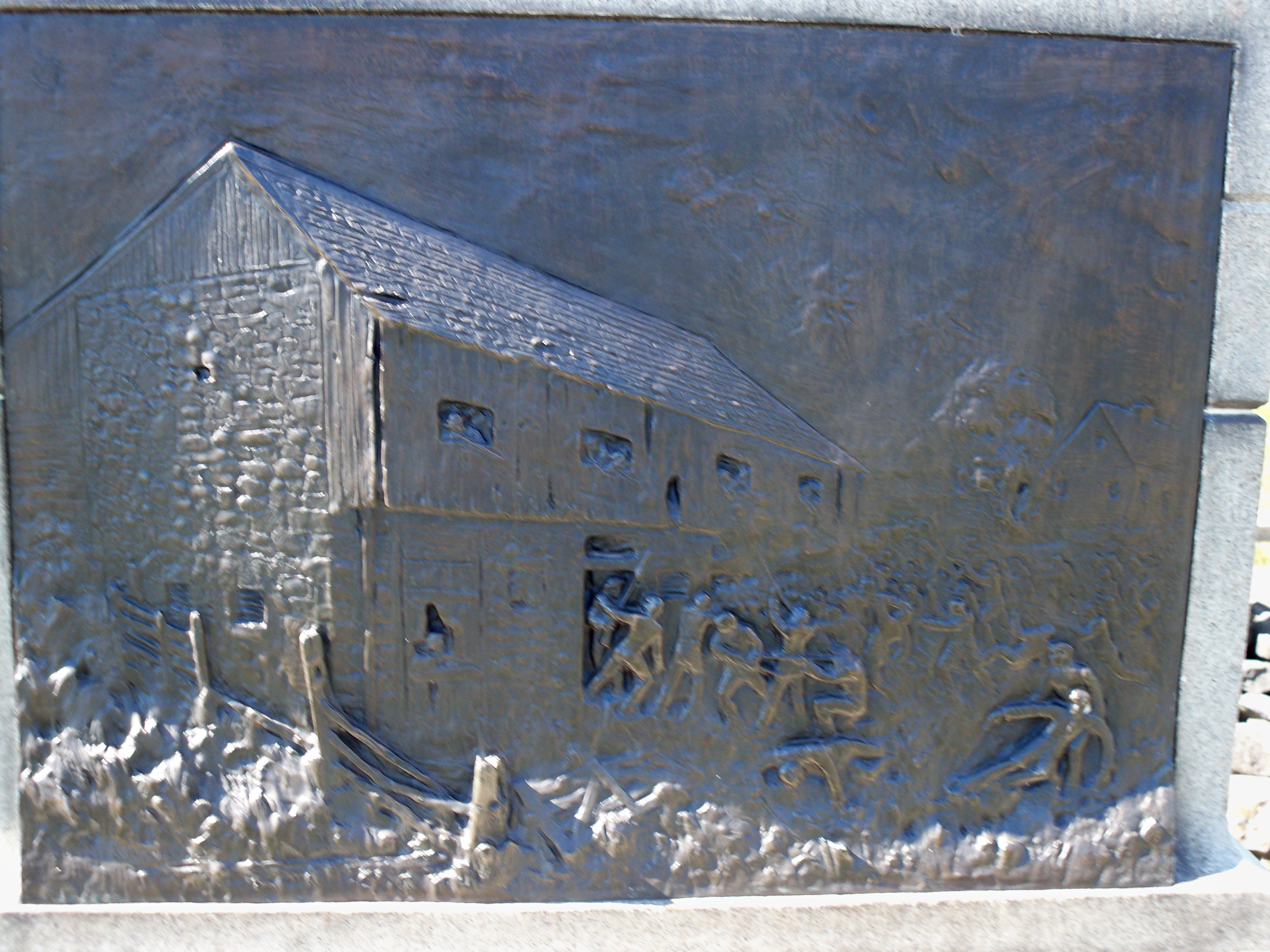
A bas relief carving depicting the regiment's assault on the Bliss Barn.

The 12th New Jersey's most major role was during the Battle of Gettysburg and Chew played a major role during the battle. On July 2, 1863, Chew and his men were scaling a stone wall at Emmitsburg Road and along with the 1st Delaware, captured the Bliss farm buildings. When Confederate artillery began to shell the fence where the 12th New Jersey began opening fire on. The only sergeant of his company requested to evacuate but Chew maintained his position, stating “We are as safe here as anywhere, you can’t run away from them things.” before the two fled the barn after an artillery shell broke the fence. When the Confederate artillery stabilized their range, Carnot Posey began to mass up the 16th Mississippi and when Chew requested the commander of the 1st Delaware, Edward P. Harris for reinforcements, Harris lost his nerves and ran away from the frontlines, leaving the 1st Delaware to lose their morale and also retreat. Chew and the 12th New Jersey held their positions for a while but overwhelmed with the amount of Mississippians, Chew ordered a retreat. Harris was then arrested for an unauthorized withdraw and Chew was praised for his brave service at the Bliss farms with one comrade exclaiming:

No better soldier served than Henry F. Chew. He was 'in it' from start to finish, always ready for duty. There is not a blot or stain on his record.

=== Later years ===
Chew would go on to participate at the Battle of the Wilderness where he got wounded on his right elbow while commanding the regiment, the Siege of Petersburg and the Battle of Appomattox Court House.

By this point, he was promoted to major on July 2, 1864, and to lieutenant colonel on February 23, 1865, before being honorably resigned on June 4, 1865. Chew returned to New Jersey to become a dentist. He married Marietta Fogg on 1868 and had two children with her. He died on May 29, 1918, while at Flushing, Queens, from a cerebral hemorrhage at the age of 80.
