= John B. Maberry =

John Maberry
- Born: December 17, 1841; Smyrna, Delaware, U.S.
- Died: December 17, 1922 (aged 81); Dover, Delaware, U.S.
- Military career
- Allegiance: United States of America; Union
- Branch: United States Army: Union Army
- Service years: 1861–1865
- Rank: Sergeant
- Units: Company F, 1st Delaware Volunteer Infantry Regiment
- Conflicts: American Civil War: Battle of Gettysburg
- Awards: Medal of Honor

John B. Maberry (December 17, 1841 – December 17, 1922) was an American Civil War Medal of Honor recipient from Smyrna, Delaware, who served in the United States Army as a sergeant in Company F of 1st Delaware Infantry. His citation was awarded for his service as a private during the Battle of Gettysburg on July 3, 1863, and reads "Capture of flag."

== See also ==
- List of Medal of Honor recipients for the Battle of Gettysburg
- List of American Civil War Medal of Honor recipients: M–P
