= Cordenio Severance =

American lawyer (1862–1925)

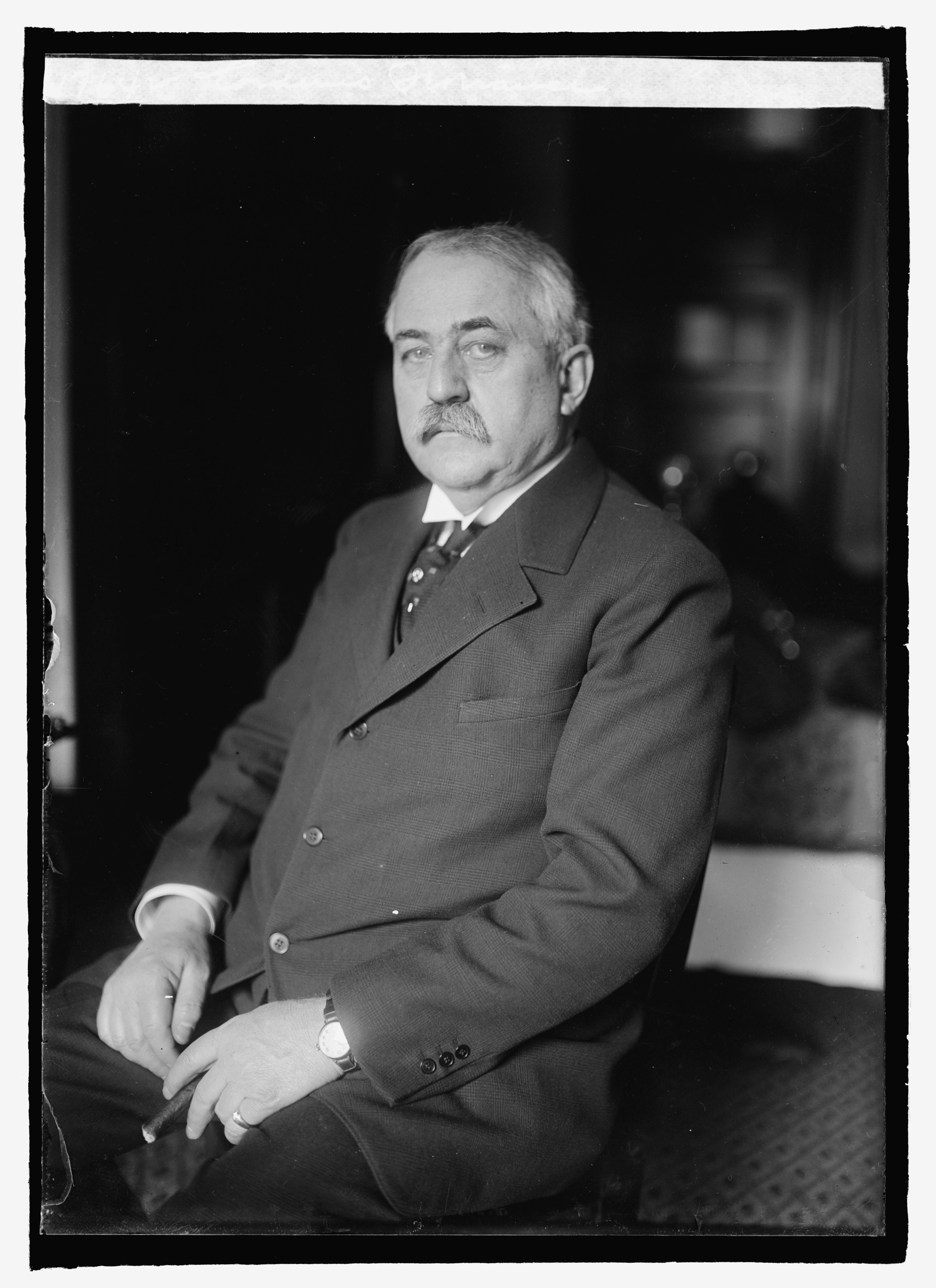
Severance in 1922

Cordenio Arnold Severance (1862–1925) was an American lawyer from Minnesota. He co-founded the American Law Institute and served as president of the American Bar Association. His wife, known as Mrs. Cordenio A. Severance published the book Indian Legends of Minnesota and survived the sinking of the RMS Republic in 1909.

== Biography ==
Severance was born in Mantorville, Minnesota on June 30, 1862. He attended Carleton College from 1877 to 1880 and then read law from 1882 to 1883 in Kasson, Minnesota. He was admitted to the state bar and by 1887, he had entered into partnership in St. Paul with former U.S. Attorney and Governor Cushman Davis and future U.S. Senator and Secretary of State Frank Kellogg. The law firm of Davis, Kellogg & Severance (later known as Briggs and Morgan, which then merged with Taft Stettinius & Hollister LLP in 2020) won national acclaim to such an extent that U.S. Steel retained Severance to defend them against the federal government in various lawsuits before the U.S. Supreme Court.

Through his personal connections, Severance also maintained a high profile in civic affairs. From 1917 to 1918, he served as the Chairman of the Red Cross Commission to Serbia, a country he returned to following the First World War as a trustee of the Carnegie Foundation.

From 1921 to 1922, Severance served as president of the American Bar Association, nine years after his old law partner Kellogg. In 1923, with Elihu Root and others, he organized and incorporated the American Law Institute.

Severance married Mary Frances Harriman (1863-1925), a daughter of Colonel Samuel H. Harriman, in 1889. They had two children who both died in infancy. Mary Severance published the book Indian Legends of Minnesota and survived the sinking of the British ocean liner, the RMS Republic in January 1909, in which six died.

Severance died of a heart attack in Pasadena, California on May 6, 1925.

The Cordenio Severance House, a mansion also known as Cedarhurst, is listed on the National Register of Historic Places.
