= 12th New Jersey Infantry Regiment =

- Flag of New Jersey
- Active: 1862–1865
- Country: United States of America
- Allegiance: United States of America; Union
- Branch: Union Army
- Type: Infantry
- Size: 992 men
- Nicknames: Buck and Ball Regiment
- Engagements: Battle of Chancellorsville; Gettysburg Campaign; Pickett's Charge; Bristoe Campaign; Mine Run Campaign; Battle of the Wilderness; Battle of Spotsylvania Court House; Battle of Cold Harbor; Siege of Petersburg

The 12th New Jersey Infantry Regiment was a Union Army regiment from New Jersey that fought in the American Civil War.

== Service ==
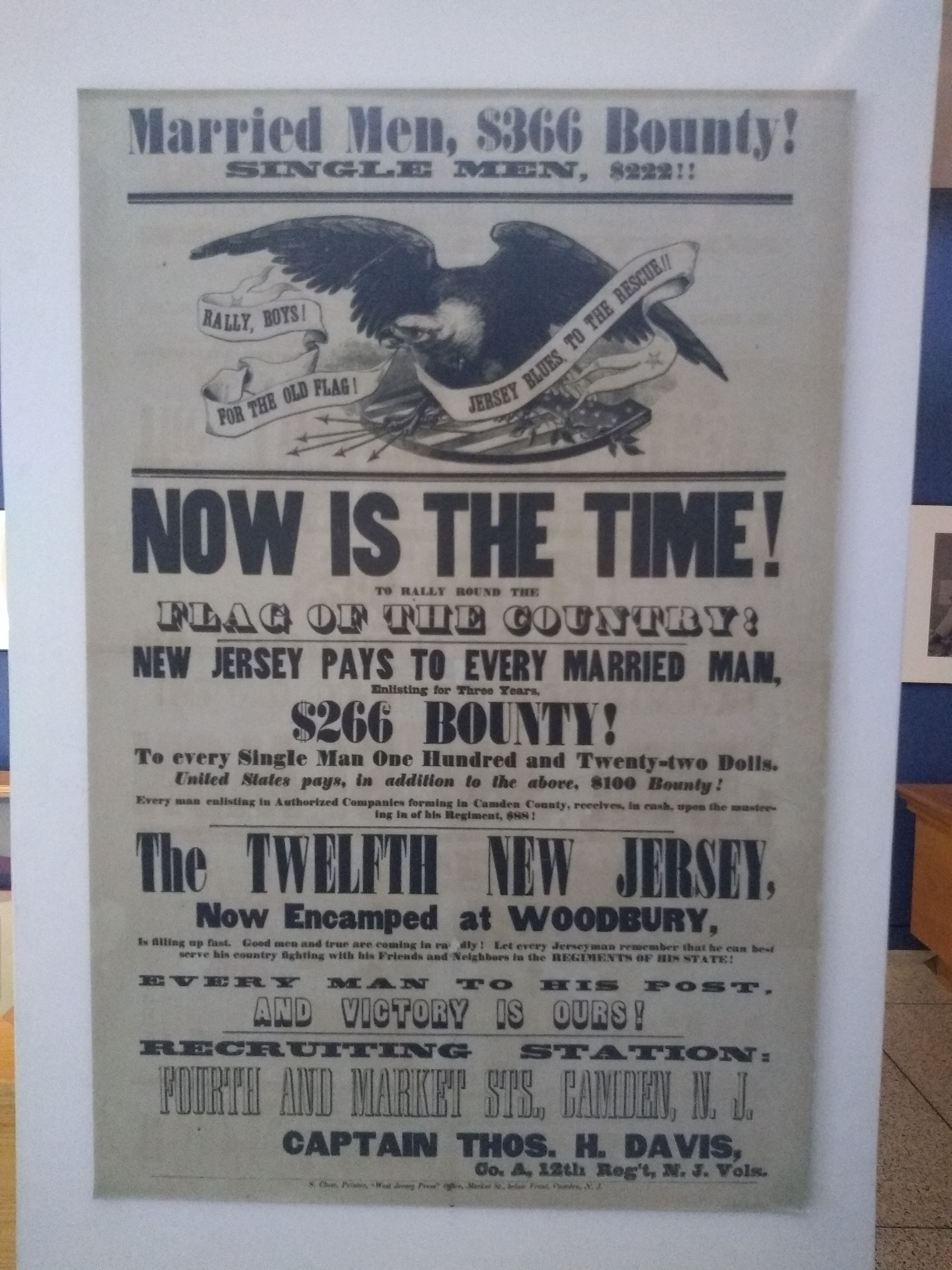
A reproduction of a recruitment poster for the regiment on display at the New Jersey State Museum

=== Foundation ===
The 12th New Jersey Infantry Regiment was organized at Camp Stockton in Woodbury, New Jersey, in the summer of 1862 in response to President Abraham Lincoln's call for an additional 300,000 men for the Union Army. After training through the summer, it was officially mustered into the Union Army on September 4, 1862.

=== Early service ===
The regiment's first assignment was guard duty in Ellicott Mills, Maryland. It first went on duty there on September 8, and remained until December 10. It then moved to Washington, D.C. where it joined the II Corps of the Army of the Potomac. It then moved with the corps to Falmouth, Virginia, reporting there on December 20 and remaining encamped there for the winter. This posting lasted until April 27, 1863, when it led the corps's crossing of the Rappahannock River just prior to the Battle of Chancellorsville. In the course of that battle, it engaged Confederate forces east of the town of Chancellorsville on the morning of May 1. The next day, the regiment joined with the rest of II Corps in forming a defensive line. On May 3, the regiment fell back to protect the corps's artillery units and sustained heavy fire. After the conclusion of the battle, it was ordered back to Falmouth and remained there until the beginning of the Gettysburg campaign in July.

=== Gettysburg Campaign ===
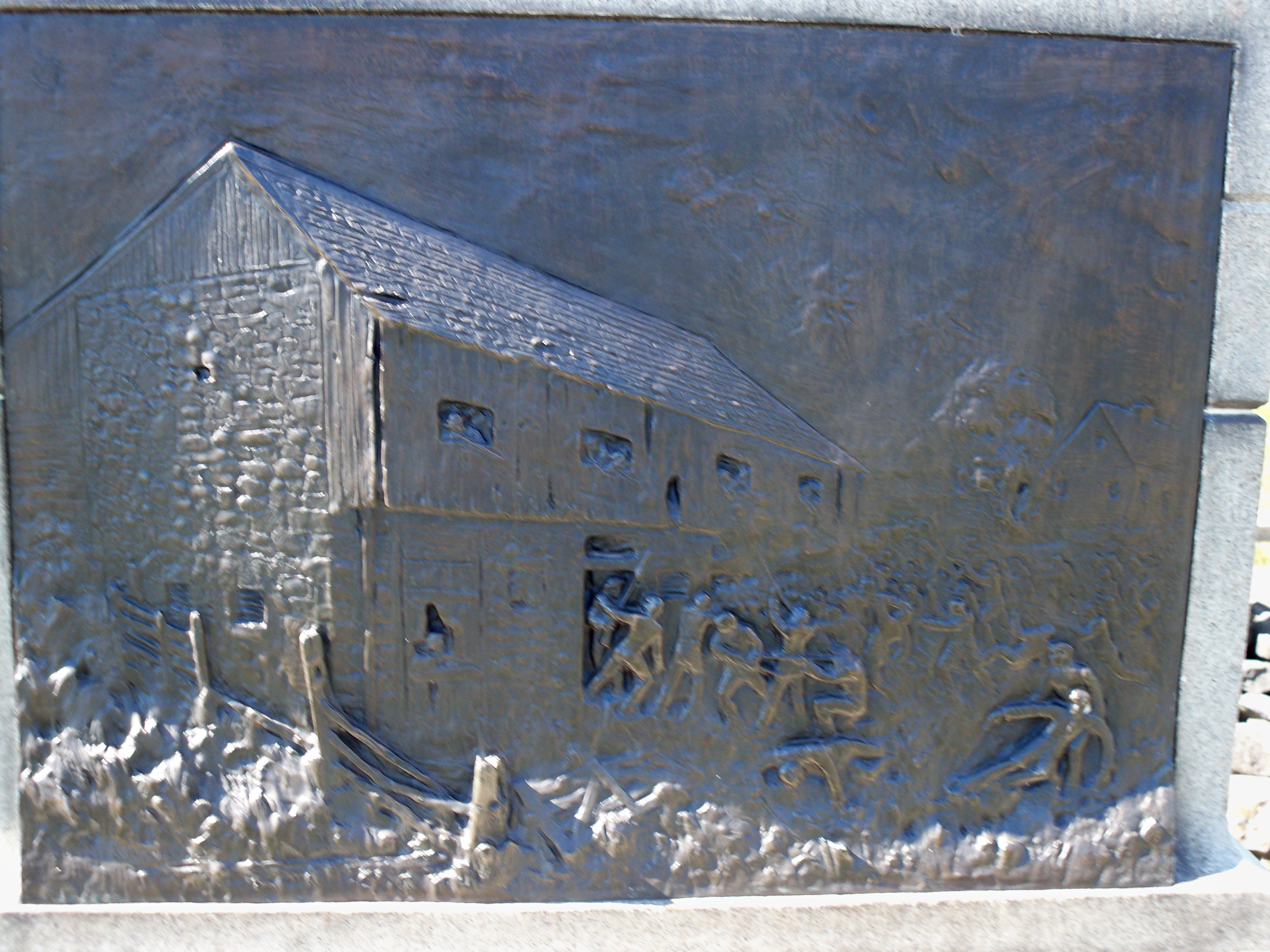
A bas relief carving depicting the regiment's assault on the Bliss Barn.

After Confederate cavalry was reported near Chambersburg, Pennsylvania, the regiment was ordered north to help screen Washington, D.C. It then moved toward Gettysburg, Pennsylvania, arriving early on July 2. Soon afterward, Company I of the regiment was sent to the skirmish line, but full combat had not yet begun and it sustained only minimal casualties. Throughout that day, intense fighting raged around a farm owned by William Bliss. By the mid-afternoon, the Union held the barn and the Confederacy held the house. The 1st Delaware regiment and Company I of the 12th New Jersey relieved the New York troops holding the area and moved past the farm to a fence near the house. At approximately 4 p.m., the regiment's Captain Henry F. Chew observed that Confederate General Carnot Posey was gradually bringing in reinforcements so that he could build a force sufficient to dislodge the Union forces holding the barn without drawing attention to it. He reported this to the 1st Delaware's Lieutenant Colonel Edward Harris, but his warning was rebuffed and ignored. His report was, however, accurate: Posey had gathered nearly 700 men, which proceeded to attack and force the Union forces into retreat.

At 5 p.m that day, Union general Alexander Hays ordered the barn retaken. Companies B, E, H, and G of the 12th New Jersey, under the command of Captain Samuel Jobes, were chosen for the task. They were fired upon by both sharpshooters in the Bliss buildings and artillery batteries on the nearby Seminary Ridge and sustained heavy casualties. However, they were able to reach the farmyard and, upon so doing, fired a volley of buck and ball into the barn. They then surrounded and seized control of it, capturing about 50 of the sharpshooters within. However, the Confederacy retained control of the house and had sharpshooters there that continued to harry Union troops. General Hays ordered that the soldiers in the barn capture the house. A company of the 12th New Jersey proceeded to do so, capturing more enemy troops. In total, the regiment captured 92 men, including seven officers. The farm was held overnight and through the next morning, until the regiment burned it prior to rejoining the II Corps lines at the commencement of Pickett's Charge.

=== After Gettysburg ===
After the end of the Battle of Gettysburg and the subsequent pursuit of the Confederate Army, the regiment was assigned to duty on the Orange and Alexandria Railroad. This lasted until September 12, when it was part of an advance from the Rapidan to the Rappahannock River. The regiment then participated in the Bristoe and Mine Run campaigns, the latter ending on December 2. Afterward, the regiment encamped for the winter at Stevensburg, Virginia, until May 3, 1864.

After wintering, the regiment was a part of the newly promoted Lt. Gen. Ulysses S. Grant's southern attack in the Battle of the Wilderness. Although the regiment was not fully engaged during this battle, it took serious casualties, with one officer killed and several others wounded. It then participated in the Battle of Spotsylvania Court House, where it suffered similarly. Lieutenant Colonel Davis, one of the wounded from the Wilderness, led the regiment in this battle and was killed. Command was assumed by Captain McCoomb, who was subsequently killed during the Battle of Cold Harbor. Moving on with Grant's southern push, the regiment was a part of the Siege of Petersburg from June 16 to April 2, 1865. Soon afterward, it was present at Battle of Appomattox Court House and Robert E. Lee's surrender to Grant.

After the surrender, the regiment marched to Washington, D.C., and served duty there until it officially mustered out on July 15. Over the course of the war, 9 of the regiment's officers and 168 of its enlisted men were killed or suffered mortal wounds, and 99 enlisted men died from disease.

== Monument ==
In 1886, a monument to the regiment was dedicated at Gettysburg National Military Park. The monument is located on North Hancock Avenue, near the site of the regiment's fighting at Gettysburg.
