= Cordenio Severance House =

Historic house in Minnesota, United States

- U.S. National Register of Historic Places
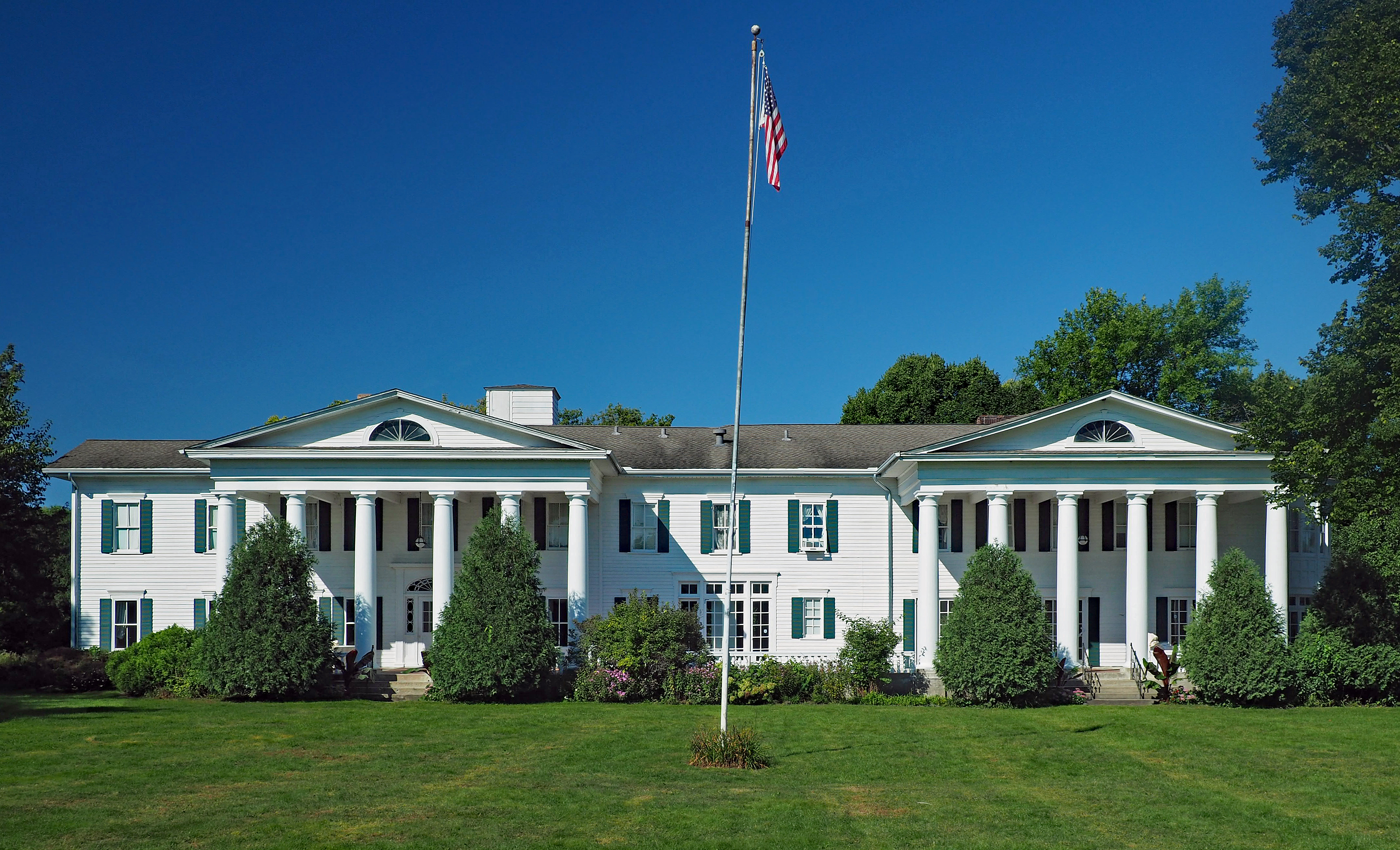
- The Cordenio Severance House from the east

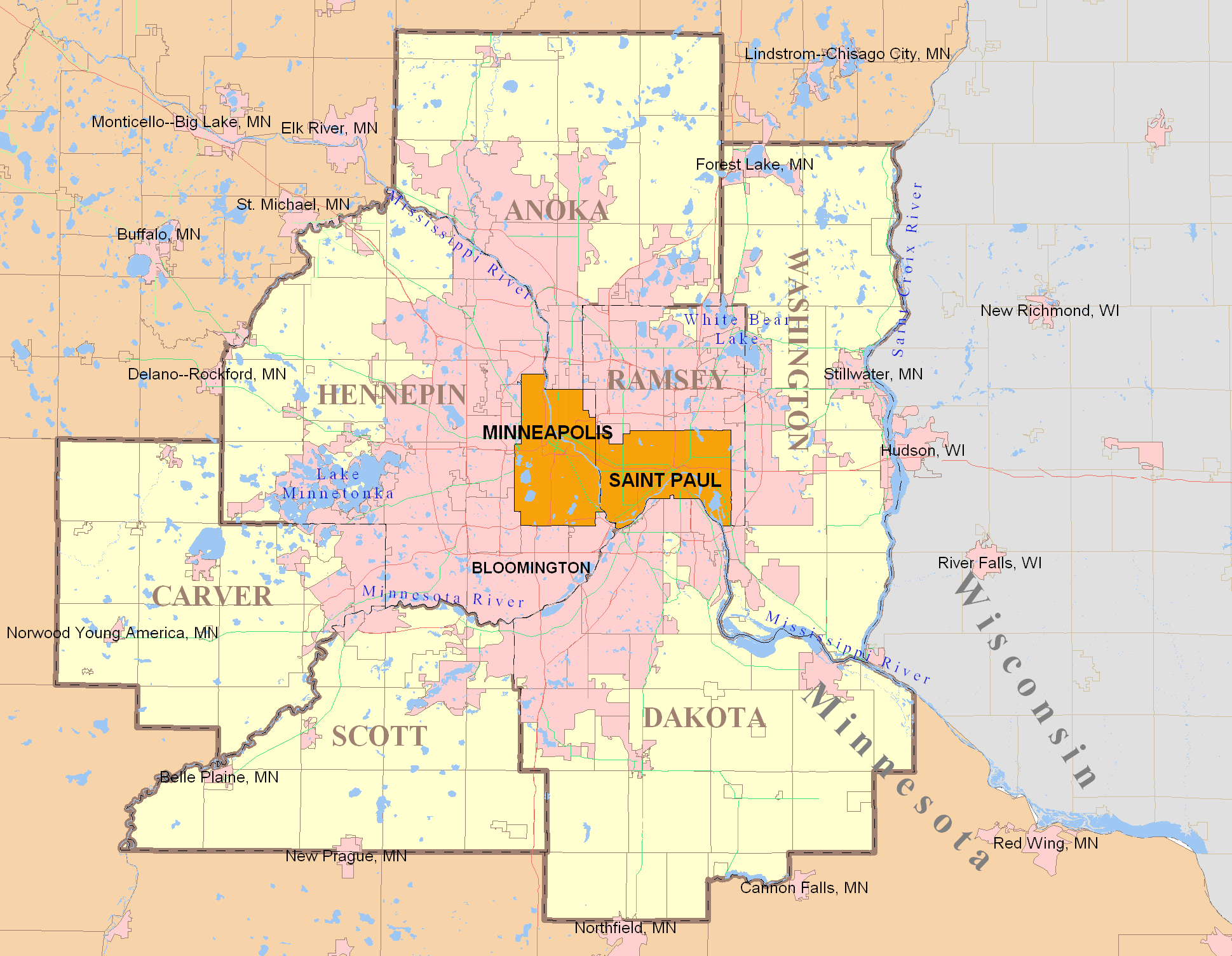
- Location within Minneapolis–Saint Paul Location within Minnesota Location within the United States
- Location: 6940 Keats Avenue South, Cottage Grove, Minnesota
- Coordinates: 44°50′56.4″N 92°54′17″W
- Area: Less than two acres
- Built: c. 1880, remodeled 1911–1917
- Architect: Cass Gilbert
- Architectural style: Italianate/Neoclassical
- NRHP reference No.: 76001077
- Added to NRHP: June 3, 1976

The Cordenio Severance House is a mansion in Cottage Grove, Minnesota, United States, built for attorney Cordenio Severance (1862–1925). The mansion, also known as Cedarhurst, was first built as a simple country farm house shortly after the American Civil War. It was expanded in 1886 to serve as the summer residence of the Severance family. Between 1911 and 1917, additions designed by architect Cass Gilbert expanded the house into a mansion with 12,000 square feet (1,100 m^{2}) and 26 rooms. The Cordenio Severance House was listed on the National Register of Historic Places in 1976 for its local significance in the themes of architecture and law. It was nominated for its association with Cordenio Severance, a leading attorney in Saint Paul, Minnesota, from 1887 to the 1920s, and for being an example of a grand country estate. The mansion now serves as an event venue.

== Description ==
The Cordenio Severance House has two Neoclassical columned porticos, a 100-foot (30 m) veranda, a formal ballroom with a pipe organ, three fireplaces, and an English rose garden.

== History ==
Cordenio Severance was well-connected politically. Presidents Theodore Roosevelt, Warren G. Harding, Calvin Coolidge, and William Howard Taft all visited the mansion, and Central Intelligence Agency meetings were once held in the library. The mansion also hosted international policy meetings.

The house is now owned by True Thao and his family. They have restored the mansion, which hosts weddings, receptions, and business meetings.

== See also ==
- National Register of Historic Places listings in Washington County, Minnesota
