= Charles B. Tanner =

American soldier (1842–1911)

- Born: November 25, 1842; Philadelphia, Pennsylvania, US
- Died: December 16, 1911 (aged 69); Baltimore, Maryland, US
- Military career
- Allegiance: United States of America
- Branch: United States Army; Union Army
- Rank: 2nd Lieutenant
- Units: Company H, 1st Delaware Infantry
- Conflicts: Battle of Antietam
- Awards: Medal of Honor

Charles B. Tanner (November 25, 1842 – December 16, 1911) was an American soldier who fought in the American Civil War. Tanner received his country's highest award for bravery during combat, the Medal of Honor. Tanner's medal was won for his heroism at the Battle of Antietam near Sharpsburg, Maryland on September 17, 1862. He was honored with the award on December 13, 1899.

Tanner died in Baltimore, Maryland, in 1911. He is buried in Greenfield Cemetery in Uniondale, Nassau County.

== Medal of Honor citation ==
The President of the United States of America, in the name of Congress, takes pleasure in presenting the Medal of Honor to Second Lieutenant Charles B. Tanner, United States Army, for extraordinary heroism on 17 September 1862, while serving with Company H, 1st Delaware Infantry, in action at Antietam, Maryland. Second Lieutenant Tanner carried off the regimental colors, which had fallen within 20 yards of the enemy's lines, the color guard of nine men having all been killed or wounded; was himself three times wounded.

== See also ==
- List of American Civil War Medal of Honor recipients: T–Z
