= William Ludgate =

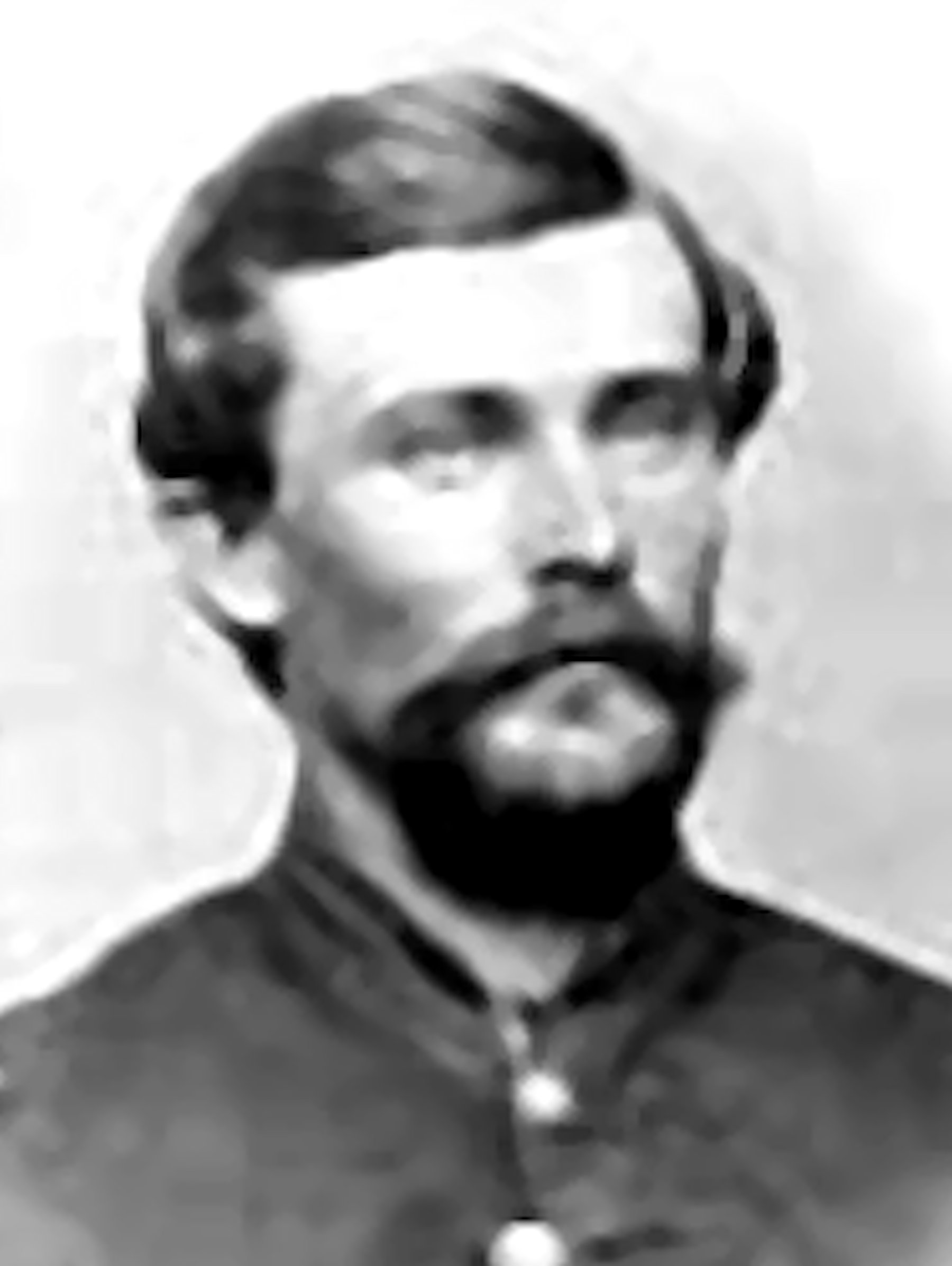
- Born: March 11, 1836; England
- Died: June 14, 1912 (aged 76)
- Military career
- Allegiance: United States; Union
- Branch: United States Army; Union Army
- Service years: 1861–1865
- Rank: Captain
- Units: Company G, 59th New York Veteran Volunteer Infantry Regiment
- Conflicts: American Civil War
- Awards: Medal of Honor

William Ludgate (March 11, 1836 – June 14, 1912) was a captain in the Union Army and a Medal of Honor recipient for his actions in the American Civil War.

Ludgate joined the army from New York City in May 1861, and was assigned to the 82nd New York Infantry, rising to the rank of sergeant major. He re-enlisted as a veteran in March 1864, and transferred to the 59th New York Infantry, where he was commissioned as an officer in September 1864. He was ultimately discharged in June 1865.

== Medal of Honor citation ==
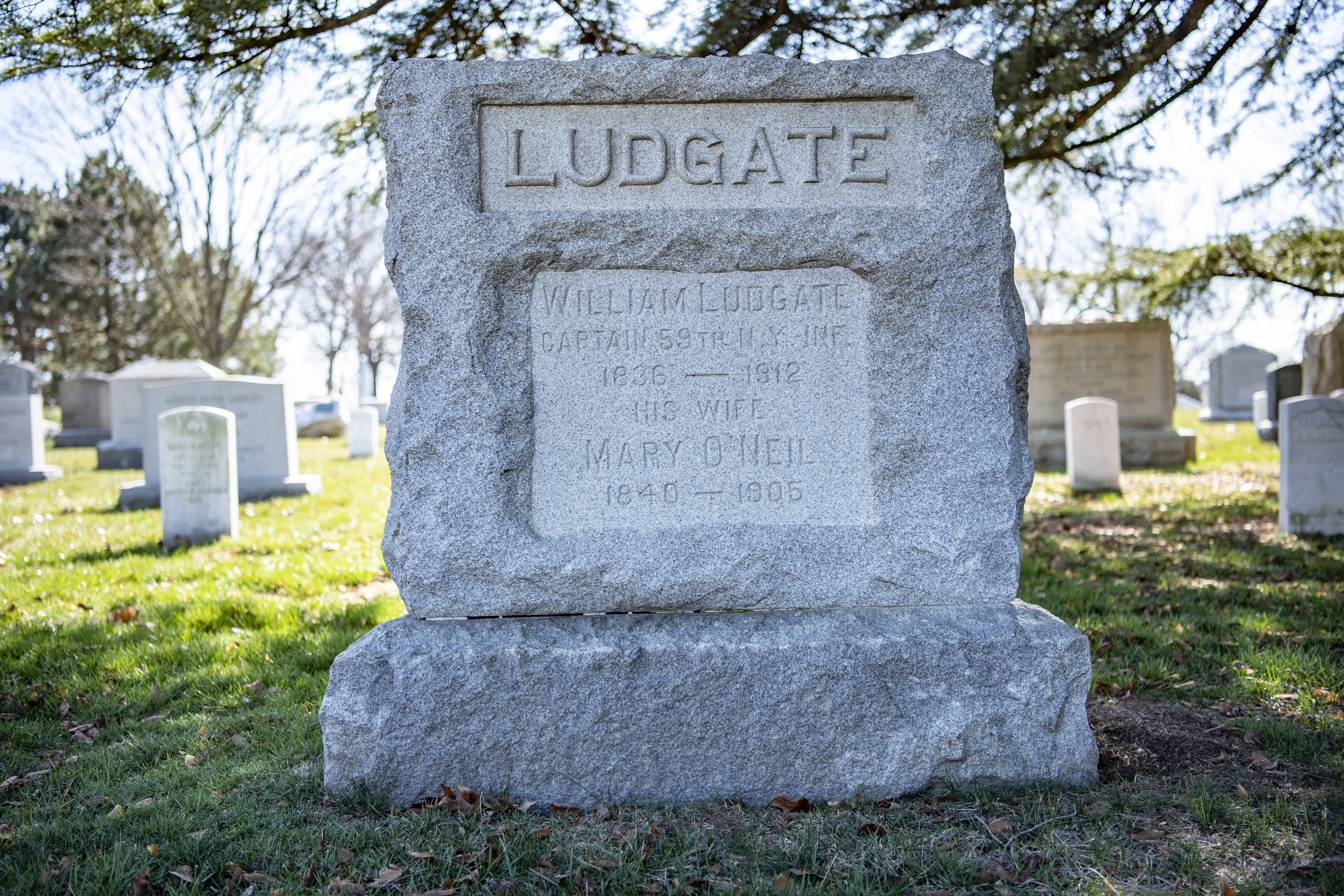
William Ludgate grave at Arlington National Cemetery

Rank and organization: Captain, Company G, 59th New York Veteran Infantry. Place and date: At Farmville, Va., April 7, 1865. Entered service at: New York, N.Y. Birth: England. Date of issue: August 10, 1889.

Citation:

Gallantry and promptness in rallying his men and advancing with a small detachment to save a bridge about to be fired by the enemy.

== See also ==
- List of Medal of Honor recipients
- List of American Civil War Medal of Honor recipients: G–L
