= West Funk =

American Civil War Medal of Honor recipient (1841-1897)

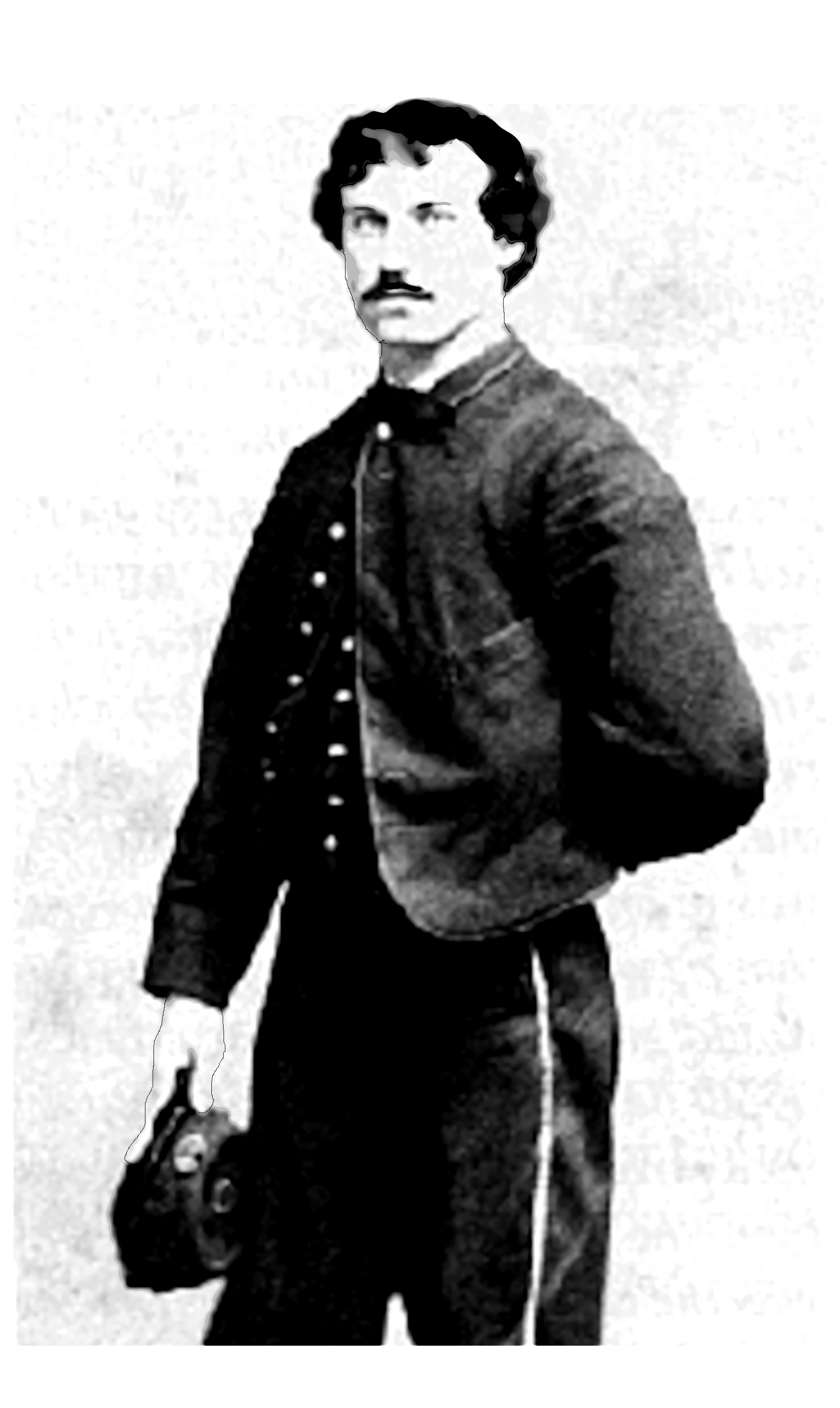
- Funk c. 1862
- Born: 1841; Boston, Massachusetts, US
- Died: July 29, 1897 (aged 55–56); Smithtown, New York, US
- Military career
- Allegiance: United States; Union
- Branch: United States Army; Union Army
- Service years: 1862–1865
- Rank: Major; Brevet Lieutenant Colonel
- Unit: 121st Pennsylvania Volunteer Infantry Regiment
- Conflicts: Battle of Appomattox Court House
- Awards: Medal of Honor

West Funk (1841 – July 29, 1897) was an American soldier who received the Medal of Honor for valor during the American Civil War.

== Biography ==
Funk enlisted in the 121st Pennsylvania in September 1862, and was mustered out with the rest of his regiment in June 1865. He was awarded the Medal of Honor on October 15, 1872 for his actions at the Battle of Appomattox Court House.

== Medal of Honor citation ==
Citation:

The President of the United States of America, in the name of Congress, takes pleasure in presenting the Medal of Honor to Major West Funk, United States Army, for extraordinary heroism on 9 April 1865, while serving with 121st Pennsylvania Infantry, in action at Appomattox Courthouse, Virginia, for capture of flag of 46th Virginia Infantry (Confederate States of America).

Civil War era Army Medal of Honor

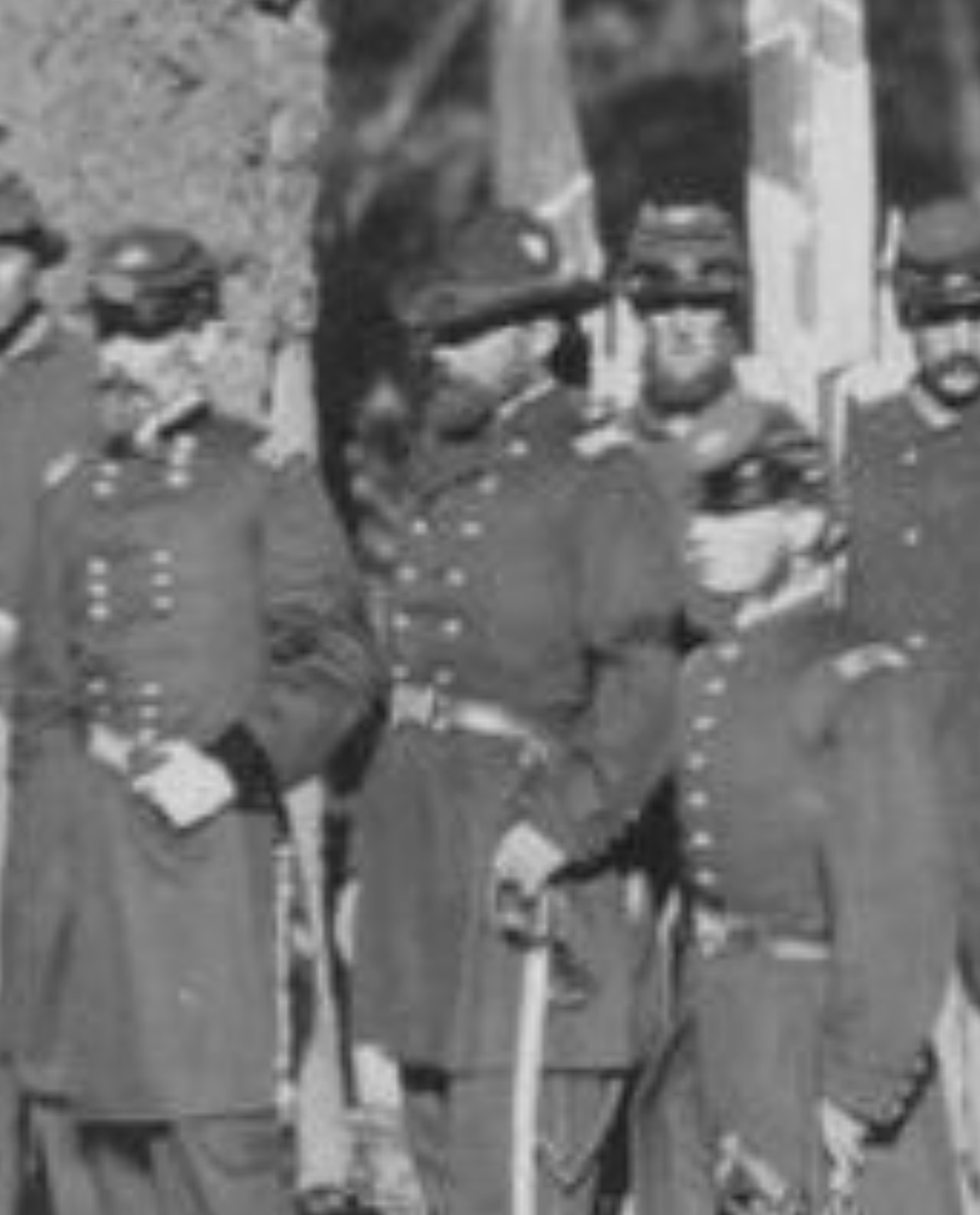
Major Funk in 1866

== See also ==
- List of American Civil War Medal of Honor recipients: A-F
