= 37th Wisconsin Infantry Regiment =

Union Army infantry regiment

- Flag of Wisconsin
- Active: April 9, 1864 – July 26, 1865
- Country: United States
- Allegiance: Union
- Branch: Infantry
- Size: Regiment
- Engagements: American Civil War: Siege of Petersburg; Battle of the Crater; Battle of Boydton Plank Road

Commanders
- Colonel: Samuel Harriman
- Colonel: John Green

The 37th Wisconsin Infantry Regiment was a volunteer infantry regiment that served in the Union Army during the American Civil War.

== Organization ==
The 37th Wisconsin was organized at Madison, Wisconsin, and mustered into Federal service on April 9, 1864. Over 40 men from the Menominee Nation enlisted in Company K.

The companies of the regiment and their captains were:

- Company A – Captain Samuel Stevens
- Company B – Captain Robert C. Eden
- Company C – Captain John Green
- Company D – Captain Alvah Nash
- Company E – Captain Frank A. Cole
- Company F – Captain Ellsworth Burnett
- Company G – Captain Martin W. Heller
- Company H – Captain Frank T. Hobbs
- Company I – Captain George A. Beck
- Company K – Captain Allen A. Burnett

== Service ==
The regiment was mustered out on July 27, 1865.

== Casualties ==
The 37th Wisconsin suffered 7 officers and 149 enlisted men killed or fatally wounded in action and 2 officers and 89 enlisted men who died of disease, for a total of 247 fatalities.

== Commanders ==
- Colonel Samuel Harriman
- Colonel John Green

== See also ==
- List of Wisconsin Civil War units
- Wisconsin in the American Civil War
