= 3rd Pennsylvania Heavy Artillery Regiment =

Union Army artillery regiment

3rd Pennsylvania Heavy Artillery
- Pennsylvania flag
- Active: February 17, 1863, to November 9, 1865
- Country: United States
- Allegiance: Union
- Branch: Heavy Artillery
- Engagements: American Civil War: Siege of Suffolk; Battle of Gettysburg; Siege of Petersburg

Commanders
- Notable commanders: Col. Joseph Roberts

The 3rd Pennsylvania Heavy Artillery was a heavy artillery regiment that fought in the Union Army during the American Civil War.

== History ==
The regiment was organized at Philadelphia, Pennsylvania, by the consolidation of Robert's Battalion Pennsylvania Heavy Artillery (redesignated Companies C, D, and F), Segebarth's Battalion Marine Artillery (Companies A, B, G, H, K, and L), and the 1st Battalion Pennsylvania Heavy Artillery (Company E). Companies I and M were organized in Philadelphia. Recruiting finished on February 17, 1863, with Joseph Roberts as colonel, R. V. W. Howard as lieutenant colonel, and John A. Darling as major.

The regiment was sent to Fort Monroe in Virginia, except for Company H, which was sent to Baltimore, Maryland. During the Suffolk Campaign, companies A, B, F, and G were sent to Suffolk and participated in the siege. During the Gettysburg campaign, Company H was assigned to the Second Division of the Army of the Potomac's Cavalry Corps and was present at the Battle of Gettysburg on July 2 and 3 1863. It fought at the East Cavalry Battlefield on July 3. After the campaign, the company returned to Baltimore, where it remained for the remainder of the war.

In the spring of 1864, the regiment was above its authorized strength, so its surplus men were organized into the 188th Pennsylvania Infantry. Shortly afterwards, it received more recruits, so it remained above strength.

During the Siege of Petersburg, Companies D, E, G, and N were assigned to the Army of the James to serve in light artillery batteries and to work on various parts of the fortifications. Detachments from various companies were assigned to the Naval Brigade, which fought along the rivers around Richmond and Petersburg during 1864 and 1865. Company I was selected as the guard company for the headquarters of the Army of the James.

Following the capture of Richmond, the regiment was reassigned to Fort Monroe, where it provided the guard for Jefferson Davis' imprisonment there. Companies A and B were mustered out at Fort Monroe on July 11, 1865; company H was mustered out at Baltimore on July 25; and the remaining companies were mustered out at Fort Monroe on November 9.

== Casualties ==
- Killed and mortally wounded: 0 officers, 19 enlisted men
- Died of disease: 1 officers, 214 enlisted men
- Captured or missing: 863 officers and enlisted men
- Total: ? officers, ? enlisted men

== Civil War reenactors ==
3rd PA Heavy Artillery is represented today by a group of Civil War living history reenactors, based in Boalsburg, Pennsylvania, that represents Battery B. The unit operates as a light artillery unit, as Battery H did at Gettysburg. Website for Battery B is http://batteryb-3pavol.org

== See also ==
- List of Pennsylvania Civil War units
