= Jefferson Rewey =

American politician

Jefferson Wiltse Rewey (May 26, 1835 – December 23, 1905) was a member of the Wisconsin State Assembly.

== Biography ==
Rewey was born on May 26, 1835, in Berkshire, New York. On February 16, 1859, he married Eliza A. Galbraith. They had two children. Rewey, Wisconsin, is named after him. He once owned a farm in the location of what is now Rewey. He died in Mineral Point, Wisconsin, in 1905.

== Political career ==
Rewey was a member of the Assembly during the 1868, 1881, and 1882 sessions. Additionally, he was Town Clerk and Chairman of the Town Board of Supervisors (similar to city council) of Mifflin, Wisconsin, and County Commissioner (similar to Supervisor) and Chairman of the County Board of Iowa County, Wisconsin. He was a Republican.
