= Charles F. Walcott =

Union Army general

George F.Walcott
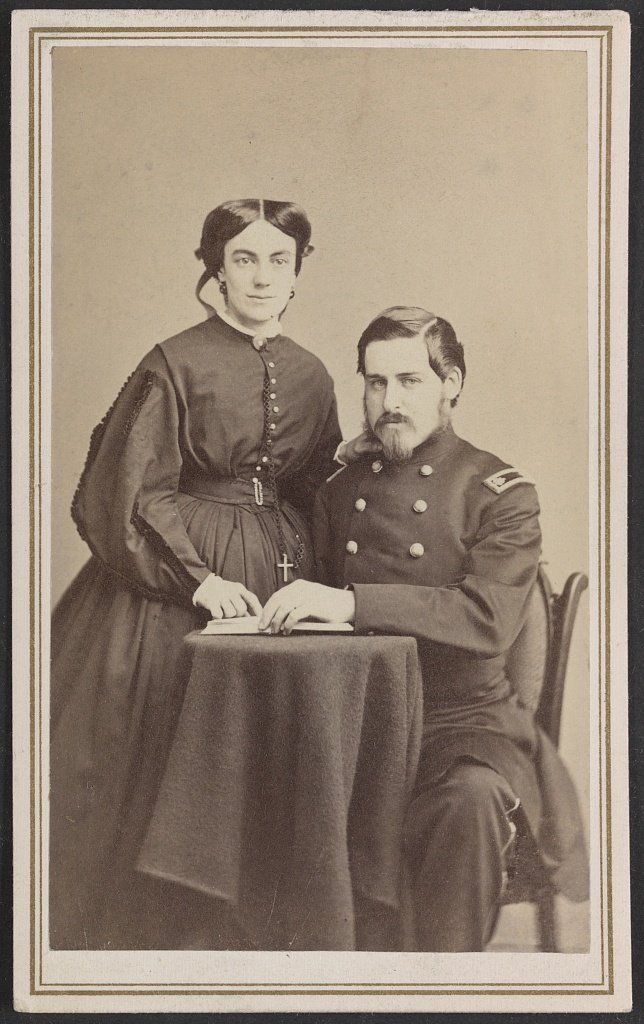
- Lt Colonel Charles Folsom Walcott and wife Anna Morrill Wyman Walcott (late 1864)
- Born: George Folsom Walcott; December 22, 1836; Hopkinton, Massachusetts, U.S.
- Died: June 11, 1888 (aged 51); Salem, Massachusetts, U.S.
- Burial place: Mount Auburn Cemetery
- Education: Harvard Law School
- Military career
- Allegiance: United States
- Branch: Union Army
- Rank: Brigadier General
- Commands: 21st Regiment Massachusetts Volunteer Infantry; 12th Regiment of Massachusetts Militia; 61st Regiment Massachusetts Volunteer Infantry
- Conflicts: American Civil War

George Folsom Walcott (1836-1888) was a Union Army officer during the American Civil War.

George F. Walcott was born December 22, 1836, in Hopkinton, Massachusetts. He was a graduate of Harvard University in 1857 and Harvard University Law School in 1860 and a lawyer.

On August 5, 1861, Walcott was appointed captain of the 21st Regiment Massachusetts Volunteer Infantry. He resigned on April 25, 1863. He was appointed captain of the 12th Regiment of Massachusetts Militia on May 16, 1864. He was mustered out of the volunteers on August 15, 1864. He was appointed lieutenant colonel of the 61st Regiment Massachusetts Volunteer Infantry on September 24, 1864, and colonel of the regiment on February 28, 1865. Walcott was mustered out of the volunteers on June 4, 1865. On January 13, 1866, President Andrew Johnson nominated Walcott for appointment to the grade of brevet brigadier general of volunteers for gallant and meritorious service resulting in the fall of Richmond, Virginia, and surrender of the Army of Northern Virginia, to rank from April 9, 1865, and the United States Senate confirmed the appointment on March 12, 1866.

Walcott was the author of History of the Twenty-First Regiment, Massachusetts Volunteers, in the War for the Preservation of the Union, 1861-1865. Boston: Houghton, Mifflin, 1882. OCLC 228668643.

Charles F. Walcott died June 11, 1888, in Salem, Massachusetts. He was buried in Mount Auburn Cemetery, Cambridge, Massachusetts.

== See also ==
- 1872 Massachusetts legislature
- List of American Civil War generals (Union)
