= 61st Massachusetts Infantry Regiment =

61st Massachusetts Volunteer Infantry
- Active: August 1864 to 1 August 1865
- Country: United States of America
- Allegiance: Union
- Branch: United States Army
- Type: Infantry
- Size: 1007
- Engagements: American Civil War

Commanders
- Lt Colonel: Charles F. Walcott

The 61st Regiment Massachusetts Volunteer Infantry was an infantry regiment raised for one year's service in the Union Army during the American Civil War from 1864 to 1865.

== History ==
Recruitment for this unit began in August 1864, with five companies being filled by October. They were encamped on Gallop's Island in Boston Harbor until 7 October 1864 when, as a battalion, was ordered to Virginia. They reached City Point on 12 October, and set up camp a couple of miles from the landing, calling it "Camp Schouler" after the Massachusetts adjutant general. They were assigned to General Benham's engineer brigade in the Army of the Potomac and were involved in erecting fortifications until 10 November, then served on picket duty until 10 December. A sixth company had joined them on the 17th of November and from 10–12 December, they were sent to hold a part of the Welden railroad near Fort Sedgewick. They afterwards returned to City Point.

On 15 March 1865, two additional companies arrived and they were given regimental status. Attached to the Independent Brigade under Brigadeer General Charles H. T. Collis, they provided provost guard duty at the headquarters until 29 March 1865. The Independent Brigade being attached to the IX Corps, the 61st was called to arms, and awaited orders to move out.

Battle of Fort Mahone

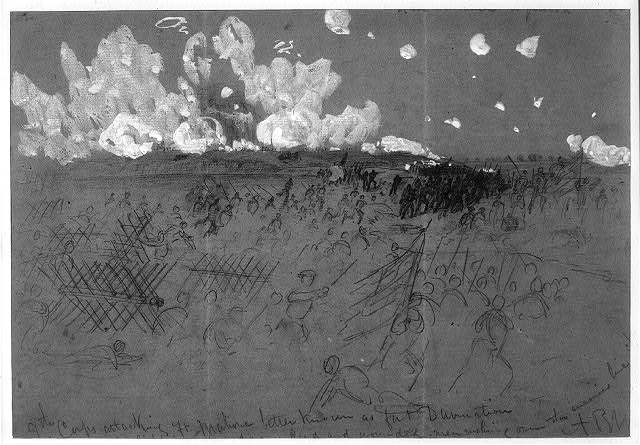
IX Corps storming Fort Mahone on 2 April 1865

On 2 April 1865, they were ordered to move against Fort Mahone, a short distance from the Union held Fort Sedgewick, and within the defenses of Petersburg, Virginia. Here the brigade was engaged with the Confederate breastworks outside of the forts throughout the day and into the night, until abandoned by the enemy. This being their first engagement, they lost five killed and 30 wounded in the assault.

They held the position outside of the city until returning to City Point on 12 April. Here they were in charge of guarding the captured troops of General Ewell's Corps. They afterwards were sent to the V Corps, stationed at Burkesville from 16 April to 1 May 1865. On the 1st, they were sent to Washington, DC, and were part of the grand review on the 23rd.

On 8 June 1865, the first five companies arrived back in Readville, Massachusetts and were discharged on the 17th. The remaining members of the unit served until 2 July, and were discharged on 1 August 1865.

== Complement ==
The 61st Regiment consisted of 41 officers (including line officers) and 966 enlisted men.

== Casualties ==
Twenty-three men died during their term of service, 17 of them by disease. One officer and 5 enlisted were killed in battle, or died from their wounds.

== See also ==
- The Story of the 48th Pennsylvania, The Assault on Fort Mahone, pg 289
- List of Massachusetts Civil War Units
- Massachusetts in the American Civil War
