= Samuel Harriman =

- Born: October 1826; Orland, Maine, U.S.
- Died: August 25, 1897 (aged 70); Hot Springs, Arkansas, U.S.
- Burial place: Cottage Grove Cemetery, Cottage Grove, Minnesota
- Spouse: Fidelia Holbrook Fanning
- Relatives: Charles Fanning Harriman (son); Mary Francis (Severance) (daughter)
- Military career
- Service years: 1862–1865
- Rank: Colonel, USV; Brig. General, USV
- Commands: 37th Reg. Wis. Vol. Infantry
- Conflicts: American Civil War; Siege of Petersburg; Battle of the Crater

Samuel Harriman (October 1826 – August 25, 1897) was a colonel in the Union Army during the American Civil War who was nominated and confirmed for appointment to the grade of brevet brigadier general in 1866.

== Biography ==
Harriman was born in Orland, Maine, in October 1826. After taking part in the California Gold Rush, Harriman and his brother founded Somerset, Wisconsin, in 1856. He died on August 25, 1897, in Hot Springs, Arkansas. He married Fidelia Holbrook Fanning and had two children, Charles Fanning Harriman and Mary Frances Harriman (Mrs. Cordenio Severance).

== Career ==
Harriman joined the Union Army in 1862 during the American Civil War and was assigned to the 30th Wisconsin Volunteer Infantry Regiment. In 1864, he helped to organize 37th Wisconsin Volunteer Infantry Regiment and was then promoted to colonel and given command of the regiment. The regiment was later attached to the IX Corps under the command of future U.S. Senator Ambrose Burnside. Harriman and the 37th would later take part in the Battle of the Crater during the Siege of Petersburg.

On January 13, 1866, President Andrew Johnson nominated Harriman for appointment to the grade of brevet brigadier general of volunteers to rank from April 2, 1865, and the United States Senate confirmed the appointment on March 12, 1866.
