= 1st Delaware Infantry Regiment =

1st Delaware Infantry Regiment 1st Delaware Veteran Infantry Regiment
- Active: May 22, 1861 – July 12, 1865
- Country: United States of America
- Allegiance: (United States) Union
- Branch: Union Army
- Type: Infantry
- Role: Infantry
- Size: 4,206 (total)
- Part of: 3rd Brigade—3rd Division—II Corps; 2nd Brigade—3rd Division—II Corps; Gibraltar (3rd) Brigade—2nd Division—II Corps; Dix's Command—Department of the Potomac
- Equipment: Springfield Model 1842
- Engagements: American Civil War

Commanders
- Notable commanders: Henry Hayes Lockwood; John William Andrews; Thomas Alfred Smyth; Edward P. Harris; Daniel Woodall; Joseph C. Nicholls

The 1st Delaware Infantry Regiment, later known as the 1st Delaware Veteran Infantry Regiment was a United States volunteer infantry regiment raised for Union Army service in the American Civil War. Part of the II Corps it served in the Eastern Theater of the American Civil War.

== Organisation and Remusterings ==
=== 90-Day Volunteers ===
When the Civil War began in April 1861, there were only about 16,000 men in the U.S. Army, and many Southern soldiers and officers were already resigning and joining the new Confederate States Army. With this drastic shortage of men in the army, President Abraham Lincoln called on the states to raise a force of 75,000 volunteers for three months to put down the insurrection in the South. Accordingly, the 1st Delaware Infantry Regiment was raised at Wilmington, Delaware, on May 22, 1861, and mustered into Federal service on May 28. The regiment comprised 37 officers and 742 enlisted men under the command of Colonel Henry H. Lockwood.

The original Field & Staff were:

Colonel: Henry H. Lockwood
Lieutenant Colonel: John W. Andrews
Major: Robert Lamott
Surgeon: R. W. Johnson
Assistant-Surgeon: James Knight
Adjutant: Lieutenant W. P. Seville
Quartermaster: H. Alderdice

The original Company Commanders were:

Co. A (Delaware Blues): Cpt. Evans Watson
Co. B: Cot. Charles Lamott
Co. C: Cpt. James Bare
Co. D: Cpt. James Green
Co. E (Wilmington Rifles): Cpt. Robert Mulligan
Co. F: Cpt. Thomas Crossley
Co. G (Sussex Volunteers): Cpt. J. Rodney Layton
Co. H: Cpt. S.H. Jenskins
Co. I: Cpt. James Leonard
Co. K: Cpt. Smith

The regiment was attached to the command of Major General John Dix ('Dix's Command", Department of the Potomac) and assigned to duty along the line of the Philadelphia, Wilmington and Baltimore Railroad. The regiment mustered out on August 30, 1861.

=== 3-Years Volunteers ===
On July 22, 1861, the United States Congress authorized a volunteer army of 500,000 men. When in August the enlistment term for the regiment ended a new 1st Regiment was raised for a term of three years at Wilmington, Delaware, between September 10 and October 19, 1861. This time the regiment had 37 officers and 846 enlisted men under the command of Colonel John W. Andrews.

The Field & Staff were:

Colonel: John W. Andrews
Lieutenant Colonel: 0. Hopkinson
Major: Thomas A. Smyth
Surgeon: D. W. Maull
Chaplain: Thomas G. Murphey
Assistant-Surgeon: S. D. Marshall
Adjutant: First Lieutenant W. P. Saville
Quartermaster: First Lieutenant T. Y. England

Sergeant-Major: James Lewis
Quartermaster's Sergeant: Frank Wilson
Commissary Sergeant: Charles S. Sehocffer
Hospital Steward: Archibald D. O'Mera
Drum-Major: Patrick Dooley

The Company Commanders were:

Co. A: Cpt. Evans S. Watson
Co. B: Cpt. James Leonard
Co. C: Cpt. Neal Ward
Co. D: Cpt. Enoch J. Smithers
Co. E: Cpt. Edward P. Harris
Co. F: Cpt. Daniel Woodall
Co. G: Cpt. Allen Shortledge
Co. H: Cpt. John B. Tanner
Co. I: Cpt. Charles Lesper
Co. K: Cpt. Thomas Crassley

=== Veteran Volunteers ===
On July 1, 1864, the 3 years enlistment would have ended and the regiment would be mustered out. Instead in July 1863 the men, still having nine months of their enlistment left, got the chance to reenlist for another 3 years from that date. On December 19, 1863, three quarters of the regiment reenlisted. The 1st Delaware was upgraded to veteran status as 1st Delaware Veteran Infantry Regiment. The 1st Delaware Infantry claimed to be first regiment in the Union to receive the coveted veteran status.

In April 1864 the 1st Delaware absorbed the remnants of the 2nd Delaware Infantry Regiment, a number of recruits and veterans with two complete companies.

== Service and engagements ==
=== 1861 ===
- Raised at Wilmington—May 22, 1861
- Mustered into Federal service—May 28
- Col. Lockwood was promoted to Brigadier and was replaced by Col. John W. Andrews—August 8
- Reorganized and trained at Wilmington—September 10-October 19
- Moved to Fort Monroe, Virginia—October 20–21

=== 1862 ===
- Camp Hamilton, (now Phoebus), Virginia—until May
- Occupation of Norfolk, Virginia—May 10
- Battle of Antietam—September 16–17
- Garrison of Harpers Ferry—September 22-October 30
- Movement to Falmouth, Virginia—October 30-November 17
- Battle of Fredericksburg—December 12–15

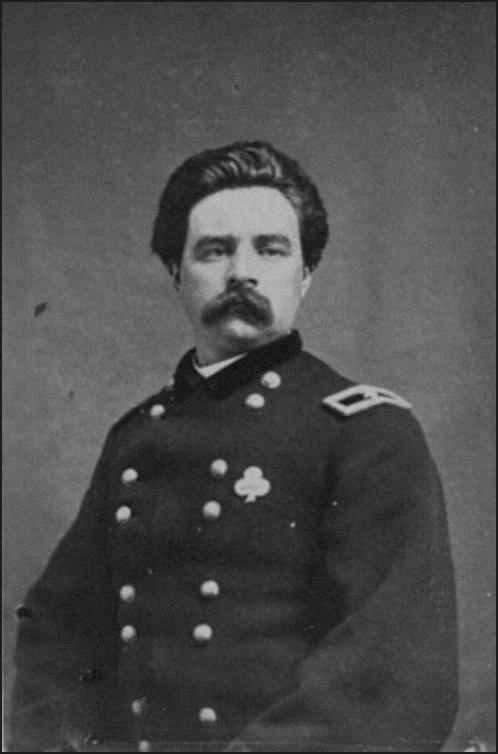
Brigadier Thomas A. Smyth, commander of the 1st Delaware 1863-1864

=== 1863 ===
- Mud March—January 20–22
- At Falmouth, Virginia—January–April
- Col. Andrews resigned and was replaced by Col. Thomas Smyth—February 7
- Battle of Chancellorsville—May 1–6
- Gettysburg campaign—June–July
- Battle of Gettysburg—July 1–3
- Pursuit of Lee to Manassas Gap—July 5–24
- Duty along the Rappahannock River and Rapidan River—July–October
- Battle of Bristoe Station—October 14
- Mine Run Campaign—November 26-December 2
- Regiment remustered as 1st Delaware Veteran Volunteer Infantry Regiment—December

=== 1864 ===
- Overland Campaign—May 3-June 15
- Battle of the Wilderness—May 5–7
- Battle of Spotsylvania Court House—May 12–21
- Battle of North Anna—May 23–26
- On line of the Pamunkey May 26–28
- Battle of Totopotomoy Creek—May 28–31
- Battle of Cold Harbor—June 1–12
- Before Petersburg—June 16–18
- Siege of Petersburg—June 16, 1864, to April 2, 1865
- Received remnants of the 2nd Delaware Infantry Regiment—April
- Battle of Jerusalem Plank Road—June 22–23, 1864
- First Battle of Deep Bottom—July 27–28
- Battle of the Crater (in reserve position)—July 30
- Second Battle of Deep Bottom—August 13–20
- Ream's Station—August 25
- Yellow House—October 1–5
- Battle of Boydton Plank Road—October 27-2
- Col. Smyth was promoted and was replaced by Col. Woodall—October

=== 1865 ===
- Battle of Hatcher's Run—February 5–7, 1865
- Watkins' House—March 25
- Appomattox Campaign—March 28-April 9
- Boydton Road and White Oak Ridge—March 29–31
- Crow's House—March 31
- Third Battle of Petersburg—April 2
- In pursuit of the Army of Northern Virginia—April 3–9
- Battle of Sailor's Creek—April 6
- Battle of High Bridge and Farmville—April 7
- Battle of Appomattox Court House—April 9
- Received the veterans of the 3rd Delaware Infantry Regiment—April
- At Burkesville—until May 2
- March to Washington, D.C.—May 2–12
- Grand Review of the Armies—May 23
- At Washington, D.C.—until July
- Mustered out of Federal service—July 12, 1865

== Other Regimental Statistics ==
=== Commanding Officers ===
Col. Henry Hayes Lockwood	May 22, 1861 – August 8, 1861
Col. John William Andrews	August 8, 1861 – February 7, 1863
Col. Thomas Alfred Smyth	February 7, 1863 – October 1, 1864 (often acting as brigade commander)
Lt. Col. Edward P. Harris	July 1, 1863 – July 2, 1863; July 4, 1863 – October 28, 1863 (acting)
Lt. Col. Daniel Woodall	October 28, 1863 – October 18, 1864 (acting)
Col. Daniel Woodall	October 18, 1864 – July 12, 1865 (often acting as brigade commander)
Lt. Col. Joseph C. Nicholls	January 1865 – June 28, 1865 (acting)

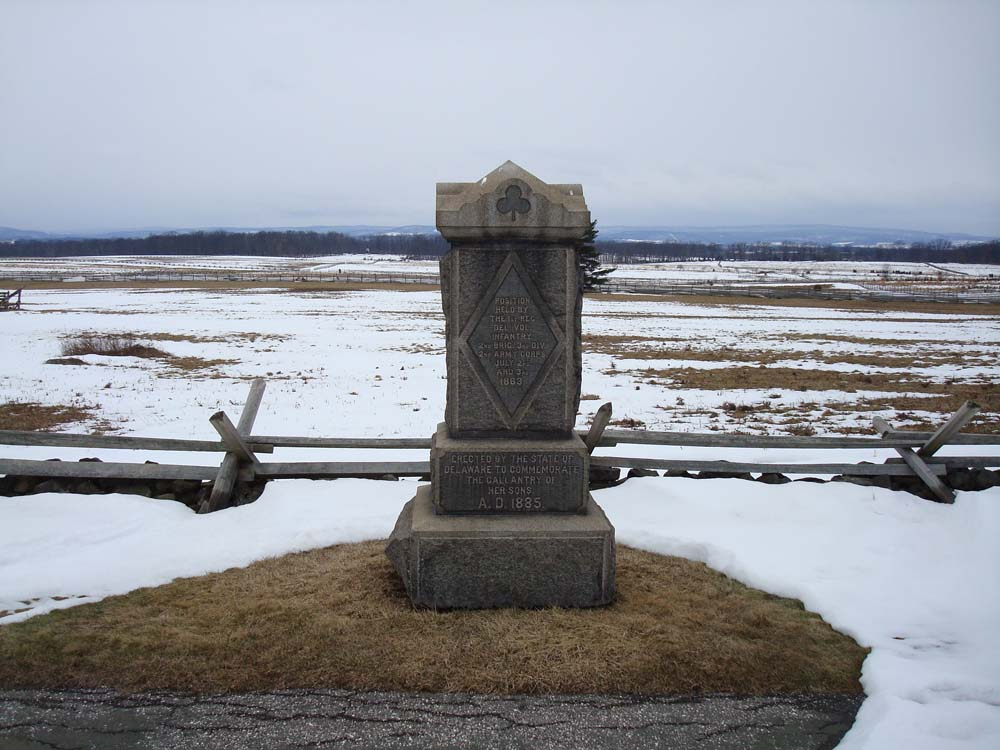
1st Delaware Infantry Monument, Hancock Avenue, Gettysburg Battlefield

=== Casualties ===
At the Battle of Antietam the regiment suffered 36 men killed and mortally wounded, and 182 men wounded, being 30.8% from a total strength of 708.

At the Battle of Fredericksburg the regiment lost 10 killed, 74 wounded and 9 missing.

At the Battle of Chancellorsville the regiment lost 6 killed, 33 wounded and 10 missing.

At the Battle of Gettysburg in 1863 the regiment suffered 10 killed, 54 wounded, and 13 missing, being 31% from a total strength of 251. It also had 4 different regimental commanders during the battle.

Throughout the war the regiment suffered 12 officers and 146 enlisted men killed and mortally wounded, and 3 officers and 118 enlisted men killed by disease.

=== Medal of Honor ===
Four men were awarded the Medal of Honor while serving with the 1st Delaware.

- Battle of Antietam
  - Second Lieutenant Charles B. Tanner of Company H earned the medal by saving the regimental flag after the entire nine-man color guard was killed or wounded. Tanner himself was wounded three times in the battle.
- Battle of Gettysburg
  - Private Bernard McCarren of Company C was awarded the medal for capturing a Confederate battle flag.
  - Private John B. Maberry of Company F was awarded the medal for capturing a Confederate battle flag.
  - Captain James P. Postles of Company A received the medal for voluntarily carrying a message under heavy fire at Gettysburg.

== Flag ==
The first flags used by the regiment was most likely made in 1861, but by 1863 the regimental flag needed to be replaced. So a committee was organized in October, it was led by Samuel M. Harrington Jr. to help raised funds to purchased a new flag for the regiment and the 2nd. In November it was completed and featured a blue field with state's coat of arms in the center with words "1st Regiment Delaware Volunteers," below it. The seal was surround by the names and dates of the battles the regiment took part in. While on the backside was bald eagle.

== See also ==
- List of Delaware Civil War units
- Delaware in the Civil War
- 1st Delaware Regiment – a Delaware regiment from the American Revolutionary War
- 198th Signal Battalion (United States) – Unit descended from 1st Delaware, article has full lineage

== Sources & External links ==
- Murphey, Rev. Thomas G. (1866). Four years in the War - The History of the First Regiment of Delaware Veteran Volunteers (Infantry). Philadelphia, PA: James C. Claxton.
- Field, Ron (2013). Lincoln’s 90-Day Volunteers 1861. Oxford: Osprey Publishing. pp. 36–37. ISBN 978-1-7809-6918-3.
- "1st Delaware Infantry". The American Civil War in the East.
- "1st Delaware Monument at Antietam". Stone Sentinels.
- "1st Delaware Monument at Gettysburg". Stone Sentinels.
