= Thomas Alfred Smyth =

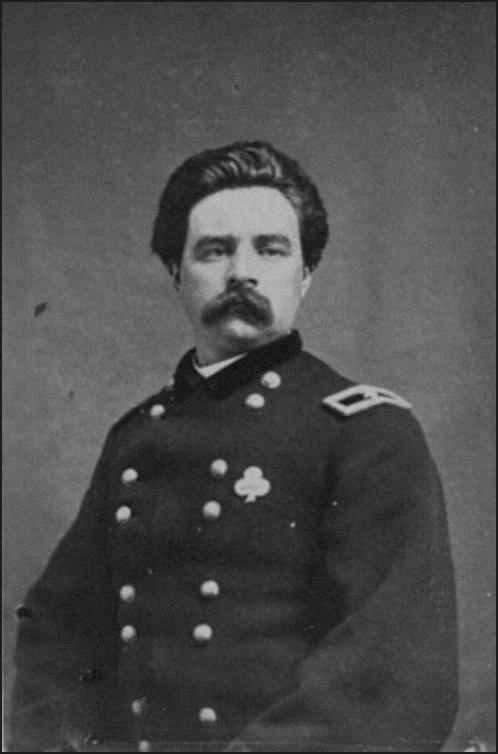
- Thomas Alfred Smyth during the American Civil War
- Born: December 25, 1832; County Cork, Ireland
- Died: April 9, 1865 (aged 32); Burkeville, Virginia
- Burial place: Wilmington and Brandywine Cemetery, Wilmington, Delaware
- Military career
- Allegiance: United States of America; Union
- Branch: United States Army; Union Army
- Service years: 1861–1865
- Rank: Brigadier General; Brevet Major General (posthumous)
- Commands: 1st Delaware Volunteer Infantry Regiment; 2nd Brigade, 3rd Division, II Corps; 2nd Brigade, 1st Division, II Corps; 3rd Brigade, 2nd Division, II Corps; 2nd Division, II Corps; Irish Brigade; Gibraltar Brigade
- Conflicts: American Civil War: Battle of Fredericksburg; Battle of Chancellorsville; Battle of Gettysburg; Siege of Petersburg

Thomas Alfred Smyth (December 25, 1832 – April 9, 1865) was a brigadier general in the Union Army during the American Civil War. He was the last Union general killed in the war. In March 1867, he was nominated and confirmed a brevet major general of volunteers posthumously to rank from April 7, 1865.

== Early life ==
Smyth was born in Ballyhooly [Irish: Baile Átha hÚlla, loose translation:"town of the ford of the apples"-Source: Logainm.ie] in Cork County, Ireland, and worked on his father's farm as a youth. He emigrated to the United States in 1854, settling in Philadelphia, Pennsylvania. He participated in William Walker's expedition to Nicaragua. Smyth was employed as a wood carver and coach & carriage maker. In 1858, he moved to Wilmington, Delaware.

== Personal life ==
Smyth was a Freemason. He was raised on March 6, 1865 in Washington Lodge No. 1 in Wilmington, Delaware.

== Civil War service ==
He enlisted in 1861 in the Union army in an Irish-American three-months regiment, the 24th Pennsylvania, and quickly made a captain. He was later commissioned as major of the 1st Delaware Infantry, a three-years regiment. He served at the battles of Fredericksburg (following which he was promoted to lieutenant colonel and then to colonel) and Chancellorsville. During the Gettysburg campaign, he commanded the 2nd Brigade, 3rd Division of the II Corps. During the Battle of Gettysburg, his men helped defend Cemetery Ridge and advanced to the area of the Bliss farm to oust enemy sharpshooters. Smyth was wounded on the third day of the battle and relinquished command briefly.

Smyth retained brigade command during the reorganization of II Corps before Grant's Overland Campaign. He led the second brigade of the first division from March 25 to May 17, 1864. When Col Samuel S. Carroll was wounded, Smyth was transferred to his command, the third brigade of second division, the Gibraltar Brigade. In October 1864, Smyth was promoted to brigadier general during the Siege of Petersburg. He retained command of his brigade throughout the siege.

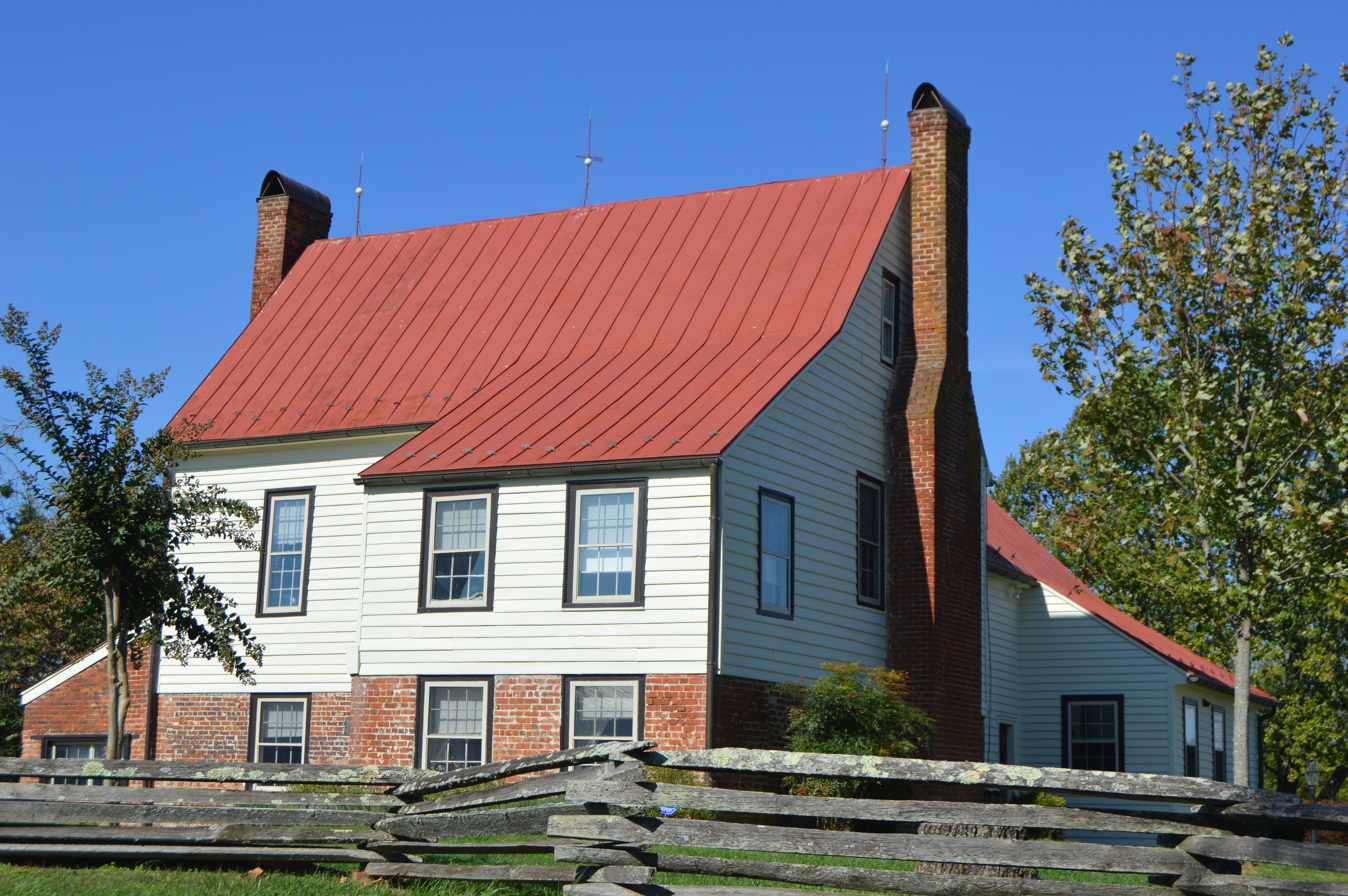
Burke's Tavern, where Smyth died

Between July 31, 1864 and August 22, 1864 and between December 23, 1864 and February 25, 1865, Smyth commanded the 2nd division of the corps. In April 1865 near Farmville, Virginia, Smyth was shot through the mouth by a sniper, with the bullet shattering his cervical vertebra and paralyzing him. Smyth died two days later at Burke's Tavern, concurrent with the surrender of Robert E. Lee and his army at Appomattox Court House.

On March 18, 1867, President of the United States Andrew Johnson nominated Smyth for posthumous appointment to the grade of brevet major general of volunteers to rank from April 7, 1865, the date he was mortally wounded, and the United States Senate confirmed the appointment on March 26, 1867. Smyth was the last Union general killed or mortally wounded during the war, and is buried in Wilmington and Brandywine Cemetery in Wilmington, Delaware.

== See also ==
- List of American Civil War generals (Union)
