= Jacob Eugene Duryée =

American brigadier general (1839–1918)

- Born: March 7, 1839
- Died: May 25, 1918 (aged 79)
- Relatives: Brigadier General Abram Duryee (father)
- Military career
- Allegiance: United States
- Branch: Union Army
- Service years: 1861-1862, 1865
- Rank: Brevet Brigadier General
- Units: 7th New York State Militia Regiment; 5th New York Volunteer Infantry
- Commands: 2nd Maryland Infantry Regiment
- Conflicts: American Civil War

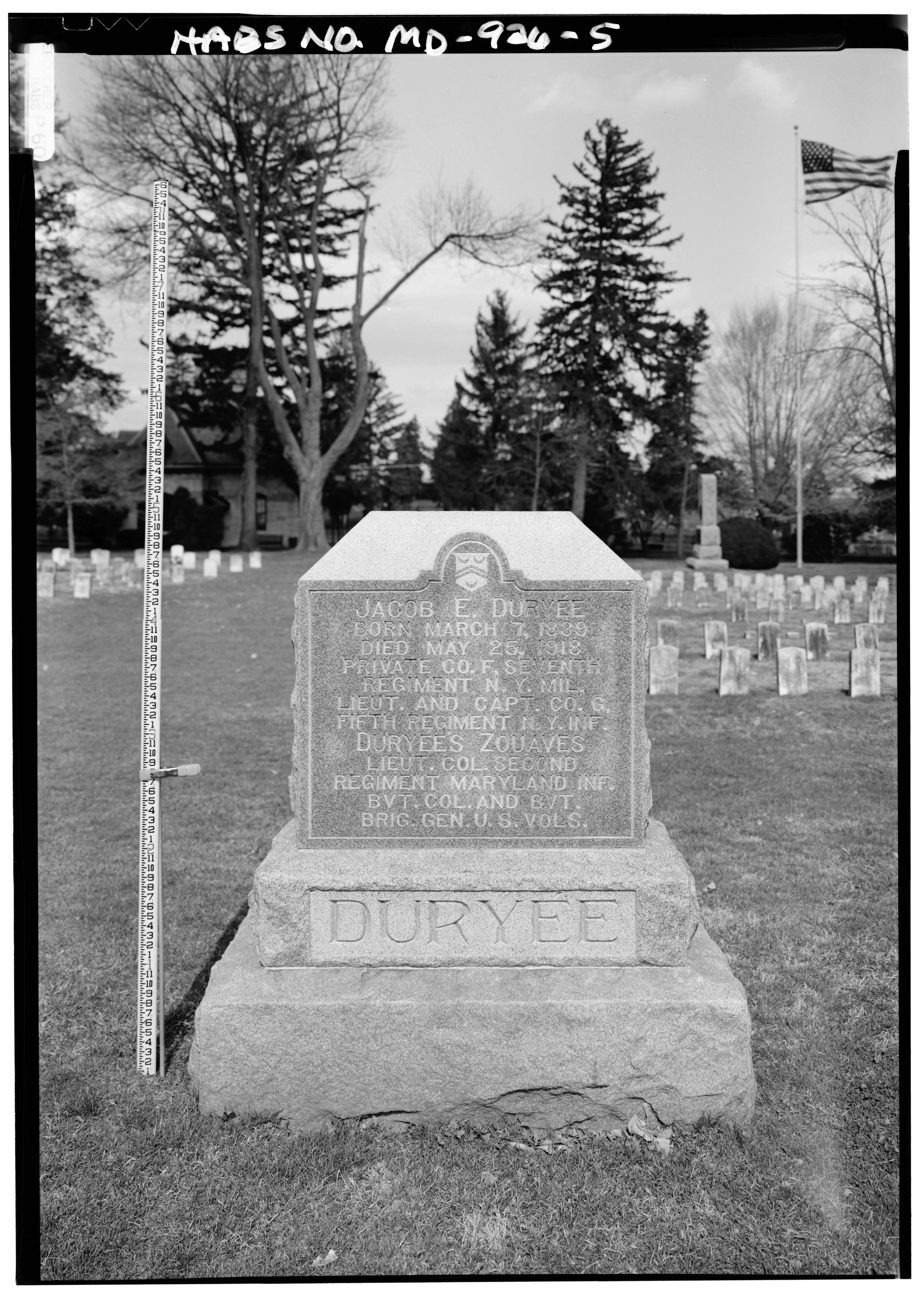
Antietam monument

Jacob Eugene Duryée (March 7, 1839 – May 25, 1918) was a lieutenant colonel in the Union Army during the American Civil War, who received the brevet grade of brigadier general of volunteers in 1867.

== Military career ==
The son of Union Brigadier General Abram Duryee, Jacob Eugene Duryée served at the start of the Civil War as a private in the 7th New York State Militia Regiment. He then was commissioned as a lieutenant and later captain in his father's regiment, the 5th New York Volunteer Infantry (known as the "Duryee Zouaves"), before Colonel Duryée became a brigade commander and brigadier general. As a lieutenant of the 5th New York Infantry, Jacob Duryée was with the regiment in the early Battle of Big Bethel on June 11, 1861. Along with Captain Judson Kilpatrick, Duryée led about 40 men across an open field toward the fortified Confederate position. Going to ground several times cut the New Yorkers' casualties, but ultimately they could not continue their advance because of the well covered positions of the Confederates and the lack of cover for the attackers in the field.

On September 21, 1861, Duryée was transferred to the 2nd Maryland Infantry Regiment as its lieutenant colonel. The regiment participated in Major General Ambrose Burnside's successful campaign to retake the North Carolina port of New Bern, culminating in the battle on March 14, 1862. On April 24, 1862, Colonel John Sommer resigned as commander of the regiment and Lieutenant Colonel Duryée took full command. On May 15, 1862, the regiment skirmished with Confederates at Pollocksville and Young's Cross Roads and destroyed the bridge at Haughton's Mill.

The regiment did not finish its work in North Carolina in time to participate in the Peninsula Campaign but joined Major General John Pope's Army of Virginia in time to take part in the Second Battle of Bull Run and the subsequent Maryland Campaign under Major General George B. McClellan.

=== Antietam ===
At the Battle of Antietam, September 17, 1862, Duryée stalwartly led his regiment from the front as the men tried to take the infamous Burnside's Bridge over Antietam Creek in the face of withering fire from Georgia regiments on the hills on the opposite bank. He continued to lead and encourage them as they took increasing casualties but finally the regiment had to break off their attack after 44 per cent of the men in the regiment had become casualties. Following the shock of Antietam, on September 22, 1862, Lieutenant Colonel Duryée resigned his commission as commander of the 2d Maryland Infantry. General Burnside did not wish to accept Duryée's resignation but understood his frustration and ultimately accepted it. After Antietam, fewer than 100 men of the original 953 in the regiment at the time of its organization answered the roll call. Duryée was especially upset that Governor Augustus Bradford of Maryland had visited the battlefield but had not visited the regiment or the makeshift hospital in which so many men from the regiment lay wounded and dying.

== After the Civil War ==
On July 5, 1867, President Andrew Johnson nominated Duryée for appointment to the brevet grade of brigadier general of volunteers, to rank from March 13, 1865, for "gallant and meritorious services," and the U.S. Senate confirmed the nomination on July 19, 1867.

Jacob Eugene Duryée was a member of the Holland Society of New York. The Duryee family were French Huguenots who came with the Dutch to New York (then New Amsterdam) in 1675.
