= 5th New York Veteran Infantry Regiment =

- Active: October 14, 1863, to August 21, 1865
- Country: United States
- Allegiance: Union
- Branch: Infantry
- Engagements: Battle of Cold Harbor; Siege of Petersburg; Battle of Five Forks

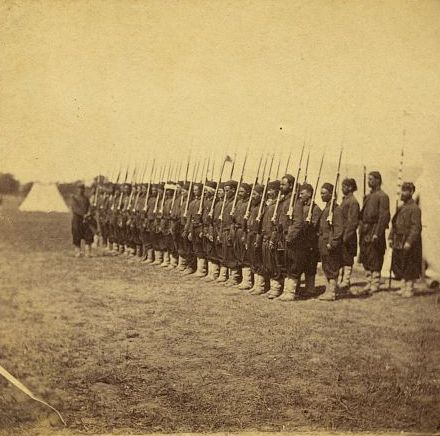
Company E, 5th Regiment N.Y. Zouaves, at Camp Butler, Va

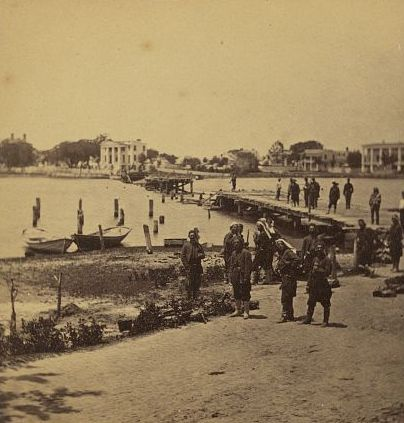
5th Regiment Zouaves near Fortress Monroe, Va.

The 5th New York Veteran Infantry Regiment was an Infantry Regiment that served in the Union Army during the American Civil War. The regiment was known as "Duryée‘s Zouaves." The regiment had two uniforms during its time. The first uniform consisted of a medium blue zouave jacket with red trimming, a grey shirt, a red sash with sky blue trimming, red chasseur trousers with yellow piping, a red fez with a yellow tassel, and a white turban. The second and official uniform consisted of a dark blue zouave jacket with red trimmings in the Hawkin Zouave design, a dark blue zouave vest with red trimming, baggy red trousers, a red sash with sky blue trimming, a red fez with a yellow tassel, and a white turban.

== Service ==
The 5th New York Veteran Volunteer Infantry Regiment was organized as a battalion of four companies with men from the old 5th New York Volunteer Infantry Regiment, "Duryea's Zouaves." As with other veteran volunteer regiments organizing in New York City from June to October 1863, the regiment was completed by consolidating the 31st and 37th New York Veteran Regiments which were also trying to organize into the one regiment. The consolidated battalion was mustered into United States service on October 14, 1863, at New York City, New York, under the command of Colonel Cleveland Winslow, for three years service. (Note: (May 26, 1836 – July 7, 1864) A Massachusetts native who had served in the New York State Militia prior to enlisting in the Union Army alongside his father, Gordon Winslow as regimental chaplain, and younger brother, Gordon Winslow, Jr. a lieutenant. Due to his experience with the militia (like several other company officers), he was a martinet who was unpopular with but respected by the enlisted men. He rose through promotion to command of the regiment shortly before Second Battle of Bull Run. As he began recruiting for the 5th New York Veteran Infantry regiment, he was recalled to New York City to suppress the New York City draft riots. Rejoining the Army of the Potomac with the full-strength 5th New York Veterans, during the Battle of Cold Harbor, Winslow was mortally wounded at Bethesda Church on June 2, 1864. Brought back to Alexandria on a hospital steamer (during which time, the elder Winslow drowned after falling off the steamer) and eventually died of his wounds at the Mansion House hospital on July 7, 1864.) This small battalion was later increased during the war by the consolidation of the Veterans from the 12th New York and the 14th Brooklyn Infantry Regiments whose terms of service had not expired when those regiments were mustered out of service later in 1864. (Note: A Record of the Commissioned Officers, Non Commissioned Officers and Privates, of the Regiments which were organized in the State of New York, and called into the service of the United States to Assist in Suppressing the Rebellion caused by the secession of some of the Southern States from the Union, A.D. 1861, as taken from the Muster-In Rolls on File in the Adjutant Generals Office, S.N.Y. Volume VI. Albany, New York: Weed, Parsons, and Company, Printers, 1866.)

On October 27, 1863, the battalion left from New York City, New York, and moved to Washington, D.C., arriving there within a few days. Upon arrival they were assigned as part of the garrison of the town of Alexandria, Virginia, under the XXII Corps in the Department of Washington. They would serve in the defenses of this area until May 1864, when they received orders to join the Army of the Potomac as part of the 1st Brigade, 1st Division, V Corps, however they were shortly thereafter transferred to the 1st Brigade of the 2nd Division of the same Corps, and with this Brigade would serve until June 1865.

The regiment was engaged in the Battles around Cold Harbor from May 31 to June 12, continuing in the advance of the Army of the Potomac against Richmond and Petersburg they found themselves engaged in the siege of the latter place from June 16, 1864, until April 2, 1865. During the Siege they took part in the operations against Weldon Railroad in June and August 1864, the engaged at Poplar Springs Church from September 29 to October 2, and in the actions near Hatchers Run in late October 1864. From February 5 to 7, 1865, they were engaged again in the Hatcher's Run area. It was during this time that on June 2, 1864, the members of the 12th New York and 14th Brooklyn Regiments were merged into the regiment, the 12th becoming Companies F and E, and the 14th Companies G, H, I, & K.

From March 28 until April 9, 1865, the regiment was actively engaged in the closing operations between the Army of the Potomac and the Army of Northern Virginia. On March 29, 30, and 31st, they were engaged along the White Oak Road, before taking part in the assault upon the Confederate forces at Five Forks on April 1. This assault forced the fall of Petersburg, and the ensuing pursuit of the Confederate Army to Appomattox Courthouse, Virginia. On April 9, 1865, the Confederate Army of Northern Virginia surrendered to the Army of the Potomac. With the surrender of the Confederate forces the regiment marched back to Washington, D.C., in May 1865, and on May 23, 1865, they took part in the Grand Review of the Armies of the United States in Washington.

In May 1865 the regiment moved to Hart's Island, New York, where they finished out the remainder of their service. It was during this time that several men from the 140th, 185th, and 189th Infantry Regiments whose terms had not expired were transferred to the regiment to finish out their terms of service. On August 21, 1865, the regiment was mustered out of United States service at Hart's Island, New York.

== Casualties ==
The regiment suffered the following casualties during its service:

- Killed In Action: 7 Officers, 49 Enlisted
- Died of Wounds: 4 Officers, 24 Enlisted
- Died of Disease and other causes: 86 Enlisted (57 Died as POW's)
- Total: 11 Officers and 159 Enlisted Men.

== Regimental Officers ==
- Colonel Cleveland Winslow
- Colonel Frederick Winthrop

== See also ==
- List of New York Civil War regiments
