= Abram Duryée =

American military and civilian police leader (1815–1890)

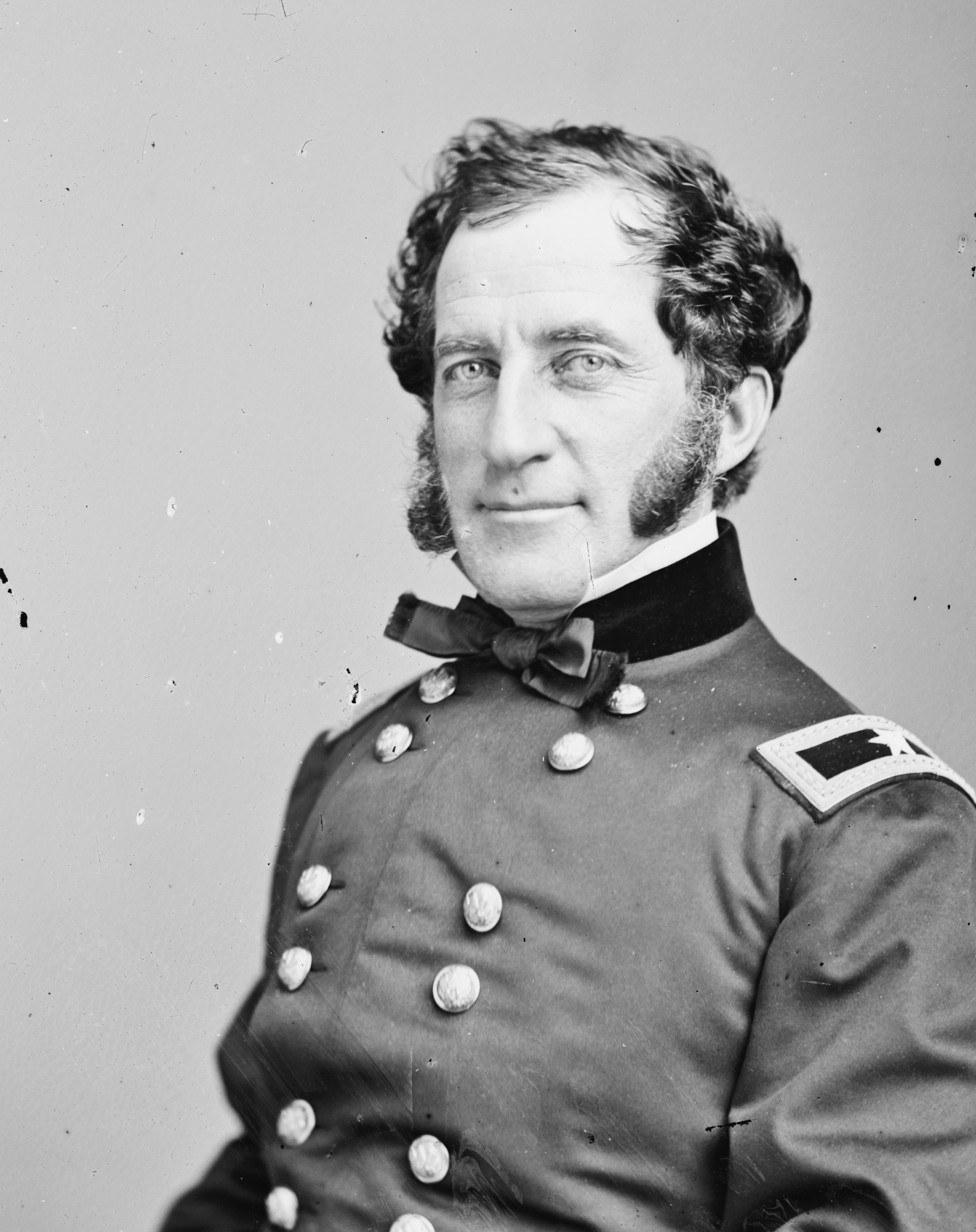
- Duryée, c. 1860–1870
- Born: April 29, 1815; New York City, New York
- Died: September 27, 1890 (aged 75); New York City, New York
- Burial place: Green-Wood Cemetery, Brooklyn, New York
- Military career
- Allegiance: United States of America; Union
- Branch: United States Army; Union Army
- Service years: 1861–1863
- Rank: Brigadier General; Brevet Major General
- Commands: 5th New York Volunteer Infantry
- Conflicts: American Civil War
- Other work: New York City Police Commissioner

Signature
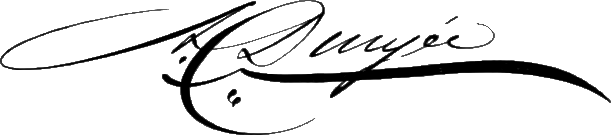

Abram Duryée (/dʊərˈjeɪ/; April 29, 1815 – September 27, 1890) was a Union Army general during the American Civil War, the commander of one of the most famous Zouave regiments, the 5th New York Volunteer Infantry. After the war he was New York City Police Commissioner.

== Birth and early years ==
Duryée was born in New York City to a family of soldiers of French Huguenot ancestry. His grandfather fought in the American Revolutionary War, and his father and two uncles were officers during the War of 1812. Graduating from the grammar school at Columbia College, Abram worked as a merchant and became wealthy as a mahogany importer in New York. In 1833, he joined the New York State Militia, serving in the 142nd New York Regiment. He moved on to the 27th Regiment (the 7th today) five years later. Starting as a private, he eventually rose to Colonel of the regiment in 1859. During his time in the militia, he led the regiment in the Astor Place Riot and was wounded twice. When he resigned his commission in 1859, it was against the protests of his colleagues.

== Civil War ==
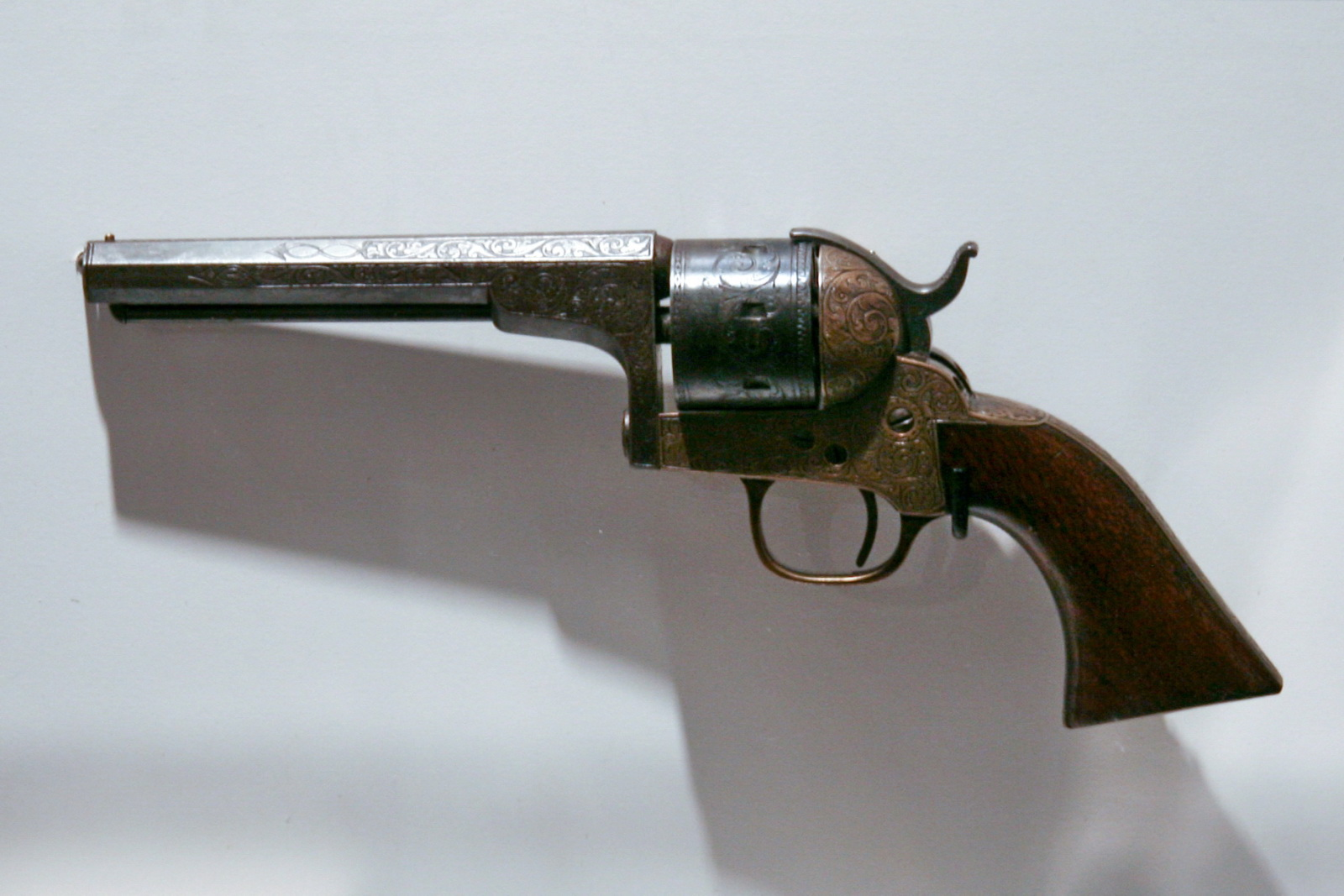
Duryée's sidearm, a seven-shot, 32-Caliber, Moore's Single Action Belt Revolver

Just after the start of the Civil War, Duryée raised a new regiment, the 5th New York Volunteers, in less than a week. He became its colonel on May 14, 1861. It was one of the several Zouave units that were formed in the mid-19th century. "Duryée's Zouaves", as they became known, fought at Big Bethel. Duryée was appointed brigadier general, on August 31, 1861, to rank from that date. President Abraham Lincoln submitted the nomination to the U.S. Senate on December 21, 1861, and the Senate confirmed the nomination on February 3, 1862. Duryée was given command of a brigade in the division under General James B. Ricketts. He later fought in the Battle of Cedar Mountain, Second Battle of Bull Run, and several others. At the Battle of Antietam, he succeeded Ricketts as division commander, when the latter was wounded. He was not afraid to be in the thick of the action; he was wounded at Second Bull Run, South Mountain, and Antietam.

After Antietam, Duryée went on a short leave of absence, and, when he returned, was disheartened to find his brigade under the command of Brig. Gen. John Gibbon, who was his junior by date of rank. He resigned on January 5, 1863, after the army rejected his claims to his old command. Despite this, on July 20, 1866, President Andrew Johnson nominated Duryée for appointment to the brevet grade of major general of volunteers, to rank from March 13, 1865, and the U.S. Senate confirmed the nomination on July 26, 1866. He was also elected by the 71st New York Infantry Regiment as their colonel and as Brigadier General by the 4th New York Brigade, both of which he declined.

== Later career ==
In 1873, Duryée was appointed New York City Police Commissioner. During his tenure as police commissioner, on January 13, 1874, Duryée led a force of 1,600 policemen to suppress a labor protest in Tompkins Square Park. Although there were no notices in sight to inform the crowd that the meeting's permit had been revoked, Commissioner Duryée led a squad of patrolmen into the crowd and ordered protestors to disperse. Police immediately began to attack the crowd using batons and mounted police charges. Samuel Gompers later described the scene in his memoirs, writing that "mounted police charged the crowd on Eighth Street, riding them down and attacking men, women, and children without discrimination. It was an orgy of brutality. I was caught in the crowd on the street and barely saved my head from being cracked by jumping down a cellarway." 46 protestors were arrested by the police, and ten were later arraigned on charges of assault and battery against police officers, aiding and inciting a riot, or with charges of "meeting and talking wildly in the streets." Speakers for the New York Committee of Safety, the organizers of the Tompkins Square protest, condemned Commissioner Duryée for having "charged his police upon inoffensive workingmen like so many 'bulldogs.'" Duryée defended the police's use of force: "It was the most glorious sight I ever saw the way the police broke and drove the crowd. Their order was perfect as they charged with their clubs uplifted."

In 1884, Duryée served as dockmaster.

Abram Duryée died in New York and is buried in Green-Wood Cemetery, Brooklyn.

== Family ==
Gen. Duryee and his wife, Caroline Elizabeth Allen Duryee (1820–1905), had five children. His son Jacob Duryée (1839 – 1918), who was also a lieutenant colonel in the Civil War, and who was nominated by President Andrew Johnson on July 5, 1867, for appointment to the brevet grade brigadier general of volunteers to rank from March 13, 1865, which the U.S. Senate confirmed on July 19, 1867. Gen. Duryee's other children were Adelaide Allen Duryee (c. 1842–1911), Caroline Antoinette Duryee (1845–1918), William Allen Duryee (1850–1852), and Cordelia Wetmore Duryee (1854–1891).

== See also ==
- List of American Civil War generals (Union)
