= Cleveland Winslow =

United States Army officer

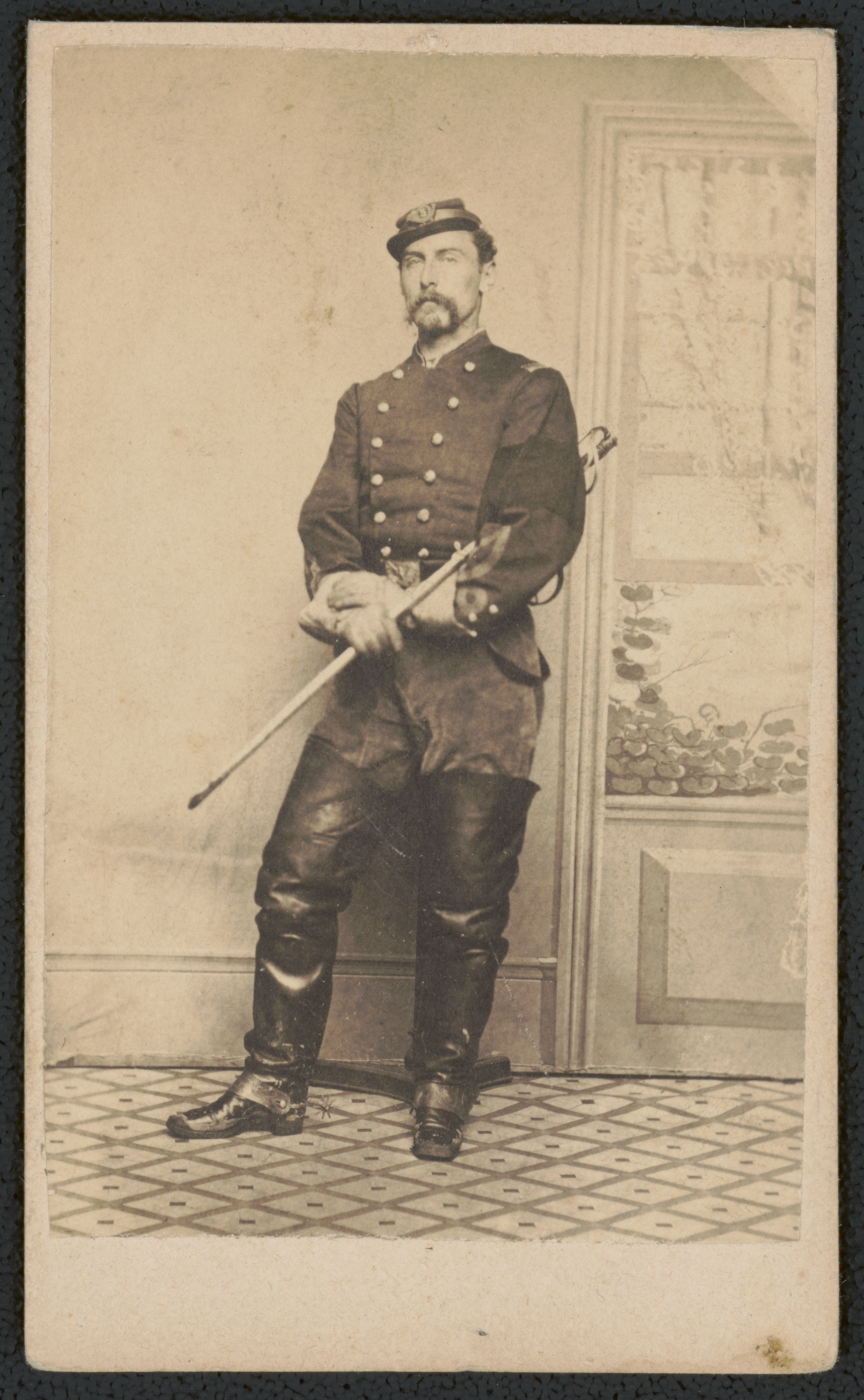
- Born: May 26, 1836; Medford, Massachusetts
- Died: July 7, 1864 (aged 28); Alexandria, Virginia
- Military career
- Allegiance: United States of America; Union
- Branch: (United States) Union Army
- Service years: 1861–1864
- Rank: Colonel
- Commands: (New York (state)) 5th New York Veteran Volunteer Infantry Regiment (1862–1864)
- Conflicts: American Civil War: Seven Days Battles; 2nd Battle of Bull Run; Antietam; Battle of Cold Harbor †

Cleveland Winslow (May 26, 1836 – July 7, 1864) was a United States Army officer who served with the 5th New York Volunteer Infantry, otherwise known as the famed Duryee's Zouaves, during the American Civil War. He was also a participant in the New York draft riots in 1863. Although a charismatic and courageous battlefield commander (and noted for his fondness of flamboyant uniforms), he was reputed to be a strict disciplinarian, generally considered unpopular with lower-ranking soldiers.

== Early life and career ==
Born in Medford, Massachusetts, as the eldest son of Reverend Dr. Gordon Winslow and Katherine G. Fish, he served in the New York State Militia prior to enlisting in the Union Army after hostilities began between Union and Confederate forces in early 1861 (his father, Gordon Winslow would also enlist in the 5th Infantry as a regimental chaplain while his younger brother, Gordon Winslow, Jr., would join the unit later on as a lieutenant).

== Civil War ==
=== Early war years ===
Assigned to the 5th New York Volunteer Infantry, Winslow initially served as captain of Company K and Company E, before assuming command from Hiram Duryea shortly before Second Battle of Bull Run. He would later command the regiment during the Seven Days Campaign as well as engagements during Antietam; however, his regiment was primarily held in reserve aside from taking part in minor skirmishes. Following these battles, Winslow rapidly rose through the ranks, being promoted to major on September 24, 1862, and colonel on December 4, 1862.

=== New York City Draft Riots ===
Returning to New York in May 1863, the original regiment was mustered out after its two-year enlistment period. However, after having subsequently reorganized the 5th New York Infantry as a veteran battalion on May 25, Winslow was recalled to New York City to suppress the New York City draft riots the following month.

Commanding a small force consisting of 50 men from his regiment as well as 200 volunteers under a Major Robinson and two howitzers under Col. E.E. Jardine, Winslow was one of many infantry forces overwhelmed by the rioters and, despite artillery support, was forced to retreat after engaging a large mob numbering an estimated 3,000 rioters in house to house fighting along First Avenue between 18th and 19th Streets.

=== Cold Harbor and Death ===
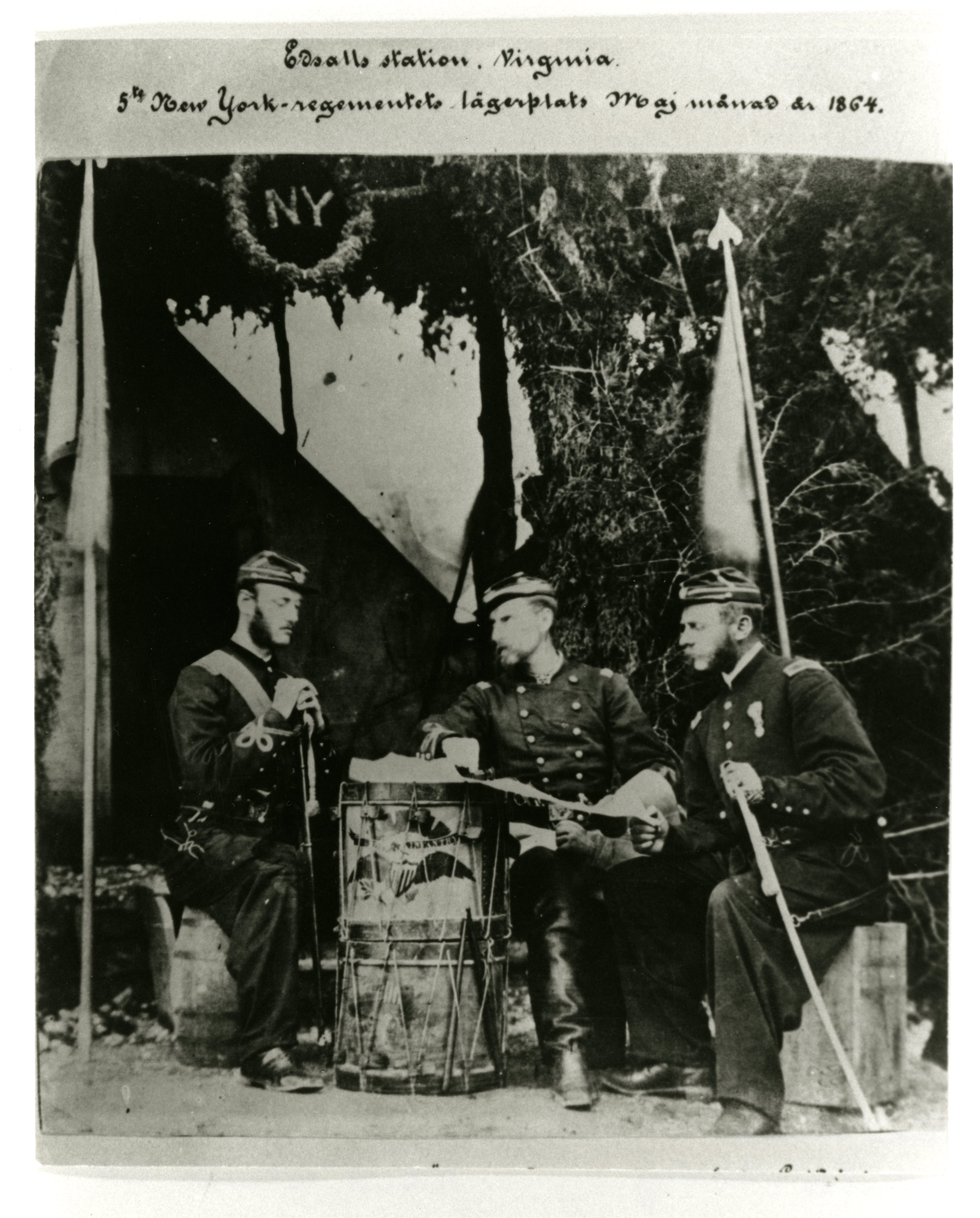
Officers of the 5th New York Veteran Infantry Regiment at Edsall’s Station, Virginia, 1864. From left to right: Axel Leatz, Cleveland Winslow, Carl Constantine Weinberg.

After several months of garrison duty while stationed in Alexandria, Virginia, Winslow and his battalion was assigned to the V Corps attached to the Army of the Potomac and gradually brought up to full strength and later led the New York 5th Infantry in its final campaign at the Battle of Chancellorsville. During the Battle of Cold Harbor, Winslow suffered a severe shoulder wound while rallying his soldiers at the Battle of Bethesda Church on June 2, 1864. Several officers of the 5th New York Veteran Infantry Regiment were killed during the same engagement, including 2nd Lieutenant Carl Constantin Weinberg, who was killed in action, and Lieutenant Axel Leatz, who was wounded and captured.

Escorted by his father Gordon Winslow, then a representative of the United States Sanitary Commission to the Army of the Potomac, Winslow was brought back to Alexandria on a hospital steamer (during which time, the elder Winslow drowned after falling off the steamer) and eventually died of his wounds at the Mansion House hospital on July 7, 1864.

Winslow is portrayed by Stan McGee in the 2007 film Red Legged Devils.
