= 2nd Maryland Infantry Regiment (Union) =

2nd Maryland Infantry, USA
- Active: 1861–1865
- Country: United States of America
- Branch: United States Army; Union Army
- Type: Infantry
- Size: One regiment
- Engagements: American Civil War, 1861–1865: Second Bull Run, 30 Aug 1862; Chantilly, 1 Sep 1862, South Mountain, 14 Sep 1862; Antietam, 17 Sep 1862; Fredericksburg, 13 Dec 1862; Blue Springs, 10 Oct 1863; Campbell's Station, 16 Nov 1863; Siege of Knoxville; Petersburg, 16–17 Jun 1864; The Crater, 30 Jul 1864; Siege of Petersburg; Weldon Railroad; Poplar Springs Church; Hatcher's Run, 5 Feb 1865; Assault of Petersburg, 2 Apr 1865

Commanders
- Ceremonial chief: President of the United States of America
- Colonel of the Regiment: Col. John Sommer

The 2nd Maryland Infantry was an American military regiment in the Union Army during the American Civil War. It should not be confused with the 2nd Maryland Infantry, CSA, which was composed of Maryland volunteers who fought for the Confederacy during the war. The regiment fought at numerous battles during the course of the war, and lost 5 officers and 84 men killed and wounded, plus 3 officers and 134 men died of disease, for a total of 226 casualties.

== History ==
=== Origins ===
The regiment was raised in Baltimore from May through October 1861. Col. John Sommer, a Mexican–American War veteran, was appointed as its first commander.

In the spring of 1862, the regiment traveled to New Bern, North Carolina, where it was incorporated into Maj. Gen. Ambrose Burnside's IX Corps of the Army of the Potomac. In July, the Second Maryland was dispatched along with the rest of Burnside's command to aid in Maj. Gen. George McClellan's foundering Peninsula Campaign outside of Richmond, arriving shortly after the Battle of Cedar Mountain.

On August 18, 1862, the Second raided a Confederate signal station at Clark Mountain, Virginia, which resulted in the discovery of a large number of Confederate troops in the area. The information confirmed that Confederate General Robert E. Lee had turned his attention to the Union Army of Virginia—headed by Maj. Gen. John Pope—and allowed Pope to shift his forces to meet the new threat.

=== Action at Bull Run ===
At the Second Battle of Bull Run (August 28–30, 1862), the regiment saw its first large-scale action. On the afternoon of the 29th, the Second Maryland, as part of James Nagle's brigade in Burnside's IX Corps, assaulted troops under the command of Confederate General T. J. "Stonewall" Jackson, entrenched in an uncompleted railroad cut. After elements of the brigade pulled back in the face of a Confederate flanking attack, the Second Maryland found itself surrounded on three sides. The unit fought its way back to Union lines, but at the cost of nearly 200 men killed, wounded or captured in scarcely 15 minutes of combat.

=== Antietam ===
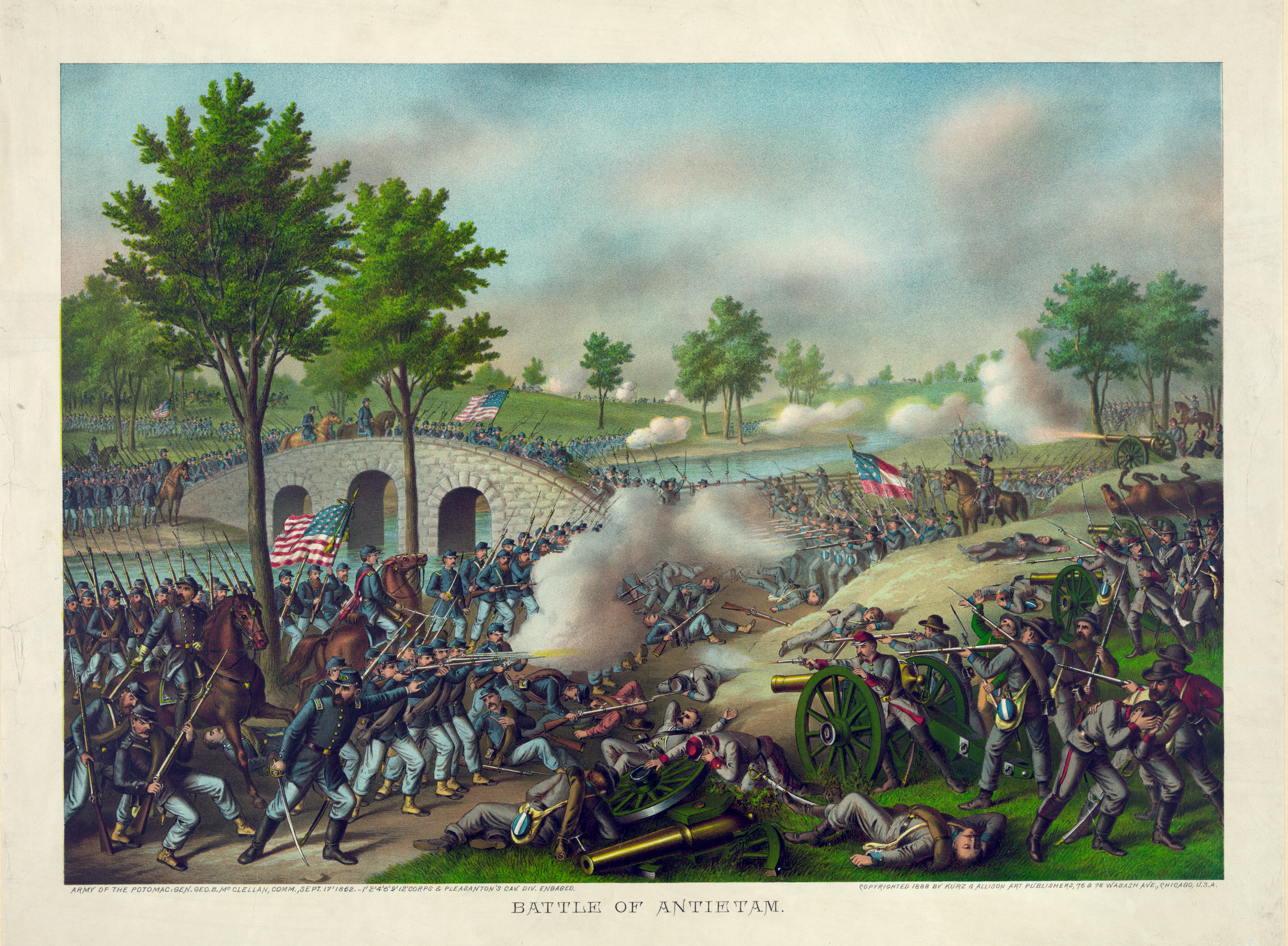
The Battle of Antietam, by Kurz & Allison, depicting the action at Burnside's Bridge

At the Battle of Antietam (September 17, 1862), the Second was again called to assault a well-entrenched Confederate force. Union commander George B. McClellan had tasked Burnside with opening up a southern front to the battle to divert Confederate forces from a simultaneous attack taking place on the north end of the field. Burnside attempted to throw his corps across Rohrbach's bridge, a small stone crossing henceforth known as "Burnside's Bridge." The crossing was defended by 400 Georgians under the command of Confederate Brig. Gen. Robert Toombs, whose men had dug themselves into the 100-foot high wooded bluff which overlooked the west side of the bridge. After one abortive attempt to take the bridge with Col. George Crook's Ohio Brigade—which resulted in skirmishers of the 11th Ohio Infantry taking 139 casualties—Burnside ordered Nagle's brigade to assault the position. After traveling for several hundred yards down a road running parallel to the creek, and open to flanking fire the entire way, Nagle's brigade, with the 2nd Maryland and 6th New Hampshire in the vanguard, broke before reaching the bridge. The Marylanders sustained 67 casualties out of an active force of less than 300 men. They fell prey to the Confederate sharpshooters and artillery, and the attack fell apart.

After Antietam, the regiment's acting commander during the engagements at Second Manassas and Antietam, Lt. Col. Jacob Duryée, resigned after the Second's appointed commander, Thomas Allard, reported for duty. By this time, the regiment numbered less than 150 men out of the 900 that had left Baltimore less than a year earlier.

=== Fredericksburg and Knoxville ===
The Second saw limited action at Fredericksburg, where they were held in reserve for most of the day before making a late assault on a stonewall at the base of Marye's Heights manned by Confederate forces. After receiving a withering fire, the Second called off the assault and lay on the field and continued firing until relieved after dark.

Many of the 2nd Infantry's surviving members were captured during the Siege of Knoxville on November 17, 1863, and sent to the infamous Andersonville Prison in Andersonville, Georgia.

Approximately 70,000 Maryland men fought for the Union during the Civil War, and approximately 20,000 fought for the Confederacy.

== List of battles ==
The Second Maryland participated in these battles, plus numerous lesser engagements:

- Second Bull Run, 30 Aug 1862
- Chantilly, 1 Sep 1862
- South Mountain, 14 Sep 1862
- Antietam, 17 Sep 1862
- Fredericksburg, 13 Dec 1862
- Blue Springs, 10 Oct 1863
- Campbell's Station, 16 Nov 1863
- Siege of Knoxville
- Petersburg, 16–17 Jun 1864
- The Crater, 30 Jul 1864
- Siege of Petersburg
  - Weldon Railroad
  - Poplar Springs Church
  - Hatcher's Run, 5 Feb 1865
- Assault of Petersburg, 2 Apr 1865

== Casualties ==
The regiment lost 5 officers and 84 men killed and wounded, plus 3 officers and 134 men died of disease, for a total of 226 casualties.

== See also ==
- 2nd Maryland Infantry, CSA
- Maryland in the American Civil War

== Sources ==
- Bailey, Ronald H., and the Editors of Time-Life Books. The Bloodiest Day: The Battle of Antietam. Alexandria, VA: Time-Life Books, 1984. ISBN 0-8094-4740-1.
- Lamb, John. "The Second Maryland Infantry 1861–1865".
- Wilmer, L. Allison; J. H. Jarrett; Geo. W. F. Vernon (1899). History and Roster of Maryland Volunteers, War of 1861–65, Volume 1. Baltimore: Guggenheimer, Weil, & Co. pp. 71–72.
