= 5th New York Infantry Regiment =

- Active: April 15, 1861, to May 14, 1863
- Country: United States
- Allegiance: Union
- Branch: Infantry
- Size: 842, (Note: As reported back to Adjutant General Hillhouse upon departure from New York on June 3, 1861) 792, (Note: As reported back to Adjutant General Hillhouse, on December 31, 1862) 780 (Note: As reported back to Adjutant General Sprague, on December 31, 1863)
- Nicknames: National Zouaves, Advance Guard Zouaves, Duryée's Zouaves
- Equipment: Model 1842 Springfield Muskets (.69 caliber, smooth) (Note: On 8 May 1861, 800 Model 1842 Springfield smoothbore (ca!. 69).), Springfield Model 1855, Springfield Model 1861 (.58 caliber), Enfield Rifled Muskets, (.577 caliber, rifled) (Note: As seen in survey before Fredericksburg and Chancellorsville.)
- Engagements: Battle of Big Bethel; Siege of Yorktown; Battle of Hanover Court House; Battle of Gaines Mill; Battle of Malvern Hill; Second Battle of Bull Run; Battle of Antietam; Battle of Fredericksburg; Battle of Chancellorsville

Commanders
- Colonel: Abram Duryée
- Colonel: Gouverneur K. Warren
- Colonel: Hiram Duryea
- Colonel: Cleveland Winslow

Insignia
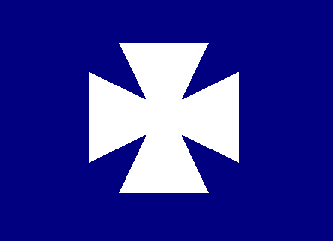
- V Corps (2nd Division) badge

The 5th New York Infantry Regiment, also known as Duryée's Zouaves, was a volunteer infantry regiment that served in the U.S. Army during the American Civil War. Modeled, like other Union and Confederate infantry regiments, on the French Zouaves of Crimean War fame, its tactics and uniforms were different from those of the standard infantry.

== Organization ==
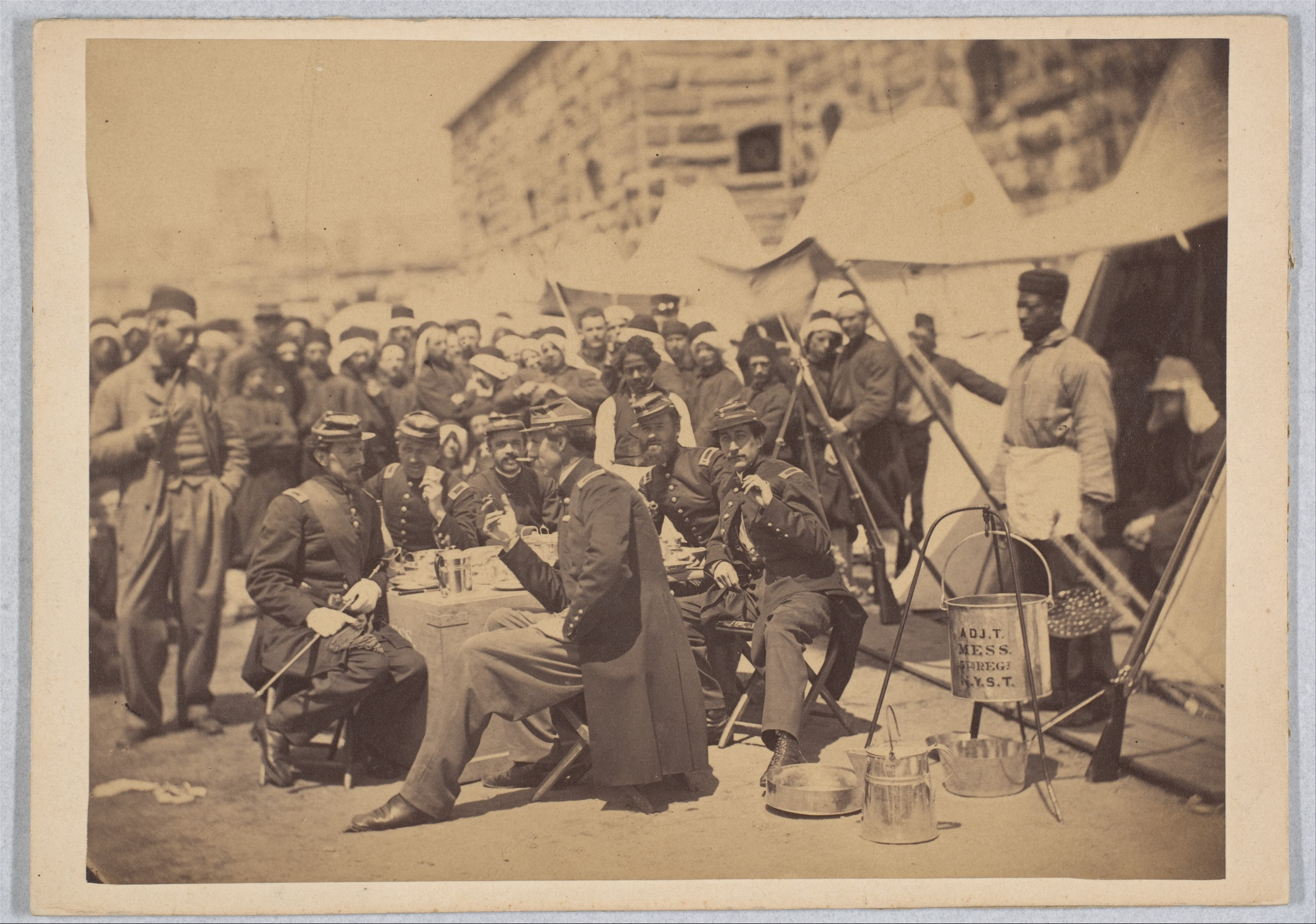
Duryea Zouaves, Regimental Mess, Fort Schuyler, May 18, 1861

The regiment was formed on April 12, 1861, by a group of military enthusiasts in Manhattan, under authority issued to Colonel Abram Duryée, and trained at Fort Schuyler at Throgs Neck, New York Harbor. On April 23, 1861, its companies were mustered into service of the State, and on April 25, the State Board confirmed the election of its field officers. The regiment was mustered into Federal service of the United States at Fort Schuyler for a term of two years by Capt. T. Seymour, US Army, two weeks later on May 9. The next day, the State Military Board formally accepted the 10th.

The majority of the soldiers were educated and above average height. The companies were recruited principally:

- A and B – New York city and Brooklyn
- C – New York city, Astoria and Poughkeepsie
- D – Fifth Ward Volunteers of New York city
- E – New York city, Brooklyn and Williamsburg
- F – New York city, Brooklyn, Fordham and Yonkers
- G – New York city, Brooklyn and New Rochelle
- H – New York city, Brooklyn, Flushing, Greenpoint, Tarrytown and West Point
- I – New York city, Brooklyn, Jamaica, Long Neck and Williamsburg, and at Perth Amboy, Plainfield and Orange, N. J.
- K – New York and Jersey City.

On April 29, 1861, the regiment withdrew 800 Model 1842 Springfield Muskets .69 caliber, smoothbore muskets from state stocks. During training the regiment acquired the following field officers: Colonel Abram Duryée, Lieut. Colonel Gouverneur K. Warren, Major J. Mansfield Davies, Adjutant Joseph E. Hamblin, Quartermaster John H. Wells, Surgeon Rufus H. Gilbert, Assistant Surgeon B. Ellis Martin, and Chaplain Rev. Gordon Winslow.

The line officers were elected as well and resulted in the following:

- Company A – Capt. Harmon Daniel Hull, 1st Lt. William T Partridge, and 2nd Lt. Charles W. Torrey
- Company B – Capt. Robert S. DuMont, 1st Lt. Gouverneur Carr, and 2nd Lt. Theodore S. DuMont
- Company C – Capt. Henry G. Davies, 1st Lt. J. Francis Evans, and 2nd Lt. Charles H. Seaman
- Company D – Capt. James L. Waugh, 1st Lt. Wilbur F. Lewis, and 2nd Lt. John A. Cochrane
- Company E – Capt. Hiram Duryea, 1st Lt. George Duryea, and 2nd Lt. Henry H. Burnett
- Company F – Capt. Henry A. Swartwout, 1st Lt. Oliver Wetmore Jr., and 2nd Lt. Carlile Boyd
- Company G – Capt. Abraham Denike, 1st Lt. Jacob Duryée, and 2nd Lt. Joseph H. Bradley
- Company H – Capt. Judson Kilpatrick, 1st Lt. Churchill J. Cambreleng, and 2nd Lt. James Miller
- Company I – Capt. Charles G. Bartlett, 1st Lt. Joseph S. York, and 2nd Lt. John H. Whitney
- Company K – Capt. Cleveland Winslow, (Note: (May 26, 1836 – July 7, 1864) A Massachusetts native who had served in the New York State Militia prior to enlisting in the Union Army alongside his father, Gordon Winslow as regimental chaplain, and younger brother, Gordon Winslow, Jr. a lieutenant. Due to his experience with the militia (like several other company officers), he was a martinet who was unpopular with but respected by the enlisted men. He rose through promotion to command of the regiment shortly before Second Battle of Bull Run. As commander at demobilization, he began recruiting for the 5th New York Veteran Infantry regiment. During this time in New York city, he was recalled to New York City to suppress the New York City draft riots. Rejoining the Army of the Potomac with the full-strength 5th New York Veterans, during the Battle of Cold Harbor, Winslow was mortally wounded at Bethesda Church on June 2, 1864. Brought back to Alexandria on a hospital steamer (during which time, the elder Winslow drowned after falling off the steamer) and eventually died of his wounds at the Mansion House hospital on July 7, 1864.) 1st Lt. Prescoyy Tracey, and 2nd Lt. William H. Hoyt.

== Service ==
=== Initial duty ===
On May 24, the regiment boarded a transport to reach the Virginia Peninsula. The regiment camped for a few days near Hampton Bridge, then moved to Camp Butler, Newport News, and was attached to Pierce's brigade. The troops of the 5th led the force at the battle of Big Bethel on Monday, June 10. Captain Judson Kilpatrick took Companies E and H in advance with Colonel Duryée following with the rest the command. The 5th lost 5 killed, 16 wounded (including Kilpatrick) and 2 missing. Immediately after the battle, the regiment began making scouting expeditions.

=== Railroad security ===
On Friday, July 26, the regiment moved to Baltimore, Maryland, to join Dix's Division (Note: Dix, a former Adjutant General of the New York State Militia, had been tasked, due in great part to his experience operating railroads, to command a regional organization known as "Dix's Command" within Maj. Gen. George B. McClellan's Department of the Potomac. Dix commanded this division of troops that replaced the mobilized 90-day volunteers from state militias and early volunteer regiments that safe-guarded the rail and other logistic lines between Washington and the free states to the north from July 1861 to the spring of 1862. After mid-August, once Dix had his units stabilized, this division was composed of the 3rd New York Infantry (Lt. Colonel Samuel M. Alford), 4th New York Infantry (Colonel Alfred W. Taylor), 5th New York, 1st Pennsylvania Reserves (Colonel R. Biddle Roberts), Cook's Boston, MA Battery, and Battery I, 2nd U. S. Artillery.) which was tasked with protecting the Philadelphia, Wilmington and Baltimore Railroad in and out of Baltimore from Washington to Philadelphia. The 5th provided security within the city and built and garrisoned an earthen fort at the summit of Federal Hill. On Thursday, August 15, Maj. Davies resigned to take command of the 2nd New York Cavalry, and two days later, Capt. Hiram Duryea of Company was promoted as his replacement.

On August 31, Duryée was promoted to general rank, so Gouverneur Kemble Warren took over command of the regiment. Duryea moved up to Lt. Colonel, and on September 3, Hull of Company A replaced Duryea as Major.

At Federal Hill, the regiment guarded the railway and the city and continuously drilled. The 5th's duty in Baltimore was marked by occasional clashes with pro-secessionist locals, patrolling the rail lines and yards, and improving the fort on Federal Hill. With the exception of a short expedition to the Eastern Shore of Virginia, the regiment used this garrison time to continue honing its skill at its manual of arms and regimental field movements.

For twenty-three days from Wednesday, November 13 to Thursday, December 5, six companies, A, B, C, D, E, F, of the 5th left Baltimore on the steamer Pocahontas. They took part in an expedition south to the Delmarva Peninsula into Accomac and Northampton Counties. The purpose was to reassert state and Federal control over those two counties where there had been reports of secessionist activity. Despite the many Unionists in the two counties, the secessionists, who were in a slight majority in Northampton County had been actively recruiting for the Confederate army and taking reprisals against Unionists. About three thousand militia had gathered to oppose any Federal advance (some were Unionists forced into ranks), and Gen. Dix intended to send a much larger force of 5,000 to intimidate them and give support to the local Unionists. The force landed above the state line on Wednesday, November 13, a proclamation calling on the militia to lay down their arms, promising protection for Unionists, and punishment for continued disloyal activities. On Sunday, November 17, the force crossed into Virginia. Within five days, all armed units melted away, and the 5th's companies and its colleagues in the force spread out to some of the towns to show the flag. The six companies returned to Fort Federal Hill on Thursday, December 5.

The 5th remained in garrison over the new year and on Thursday, February 6, it received a garrison flag from an association of ladies of South Baltimore. The locals around the fort had warmed to the 5th and took pride in it. To maintain discipline, punishments in garrison were harsh and in February, six members of the regiment who were chronic violators of army regulations were paraded to the "Rogue's March," and sent off in chains to the Washington Penitentiary and the military prison in the Dry Tortugas.

=== The Peninsula campaign ===
In preparation for his upcoming offensive in the Peninsula campaign to capture Richmond, Virginia, General George McClellan ordered the regiment to join the Army of the Potomac. McClellan said that, upon seeing the colorful New York regiment, "the Fifth is the best disciplined and soldierly regiment in the Army." After a farewell ceremony at the Fort on Friday evening, March 28, the 5th made ready to depart Baltimore.

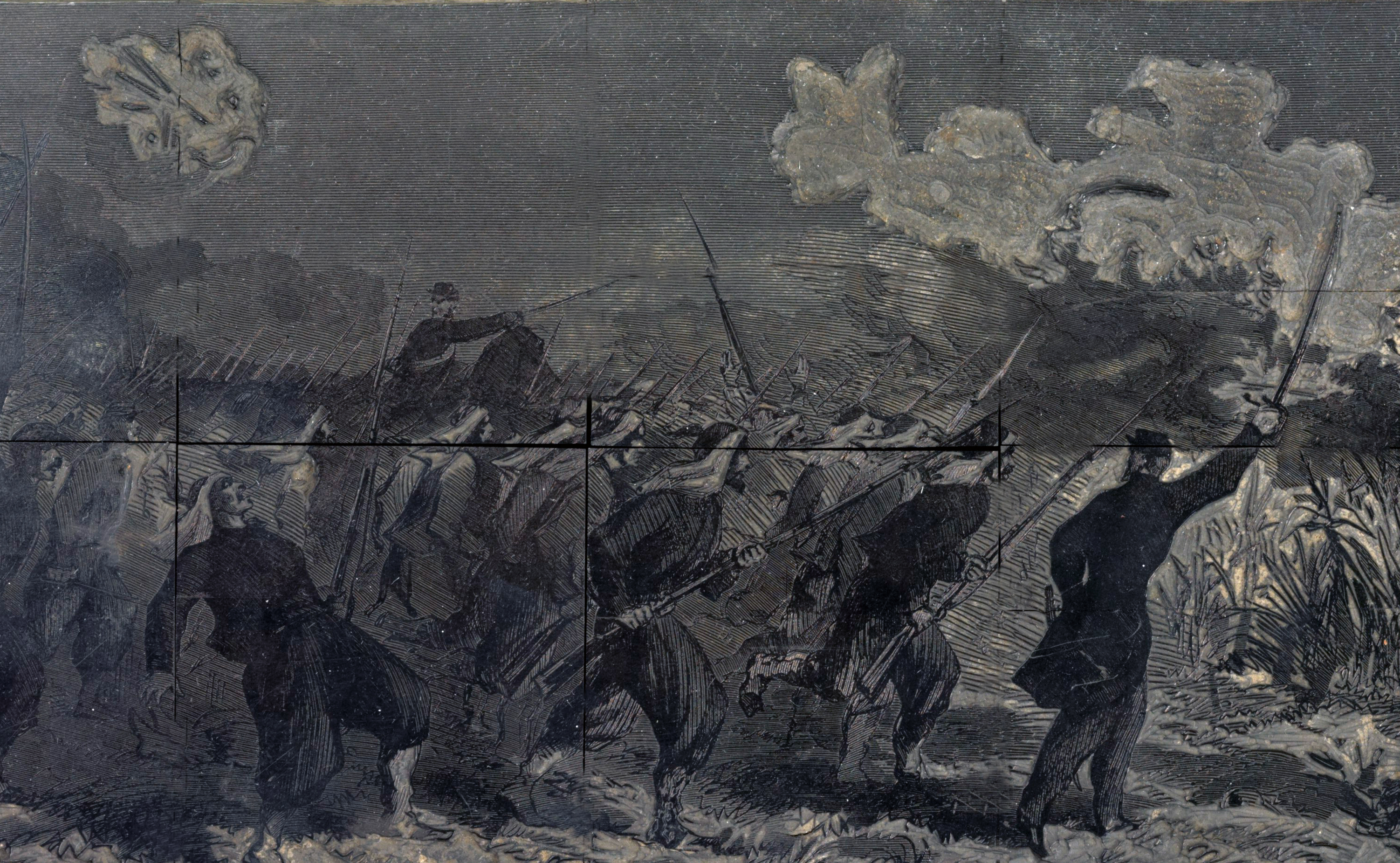
The charge of the 5th New York Volunteer Infantry unit at Big Bethel, in a sketch by Thomas Nast.

On Monday, March 31, 1862, the 5th sailed out of Baltimore, down the Chesapeake, and landed at Hampton Roads. Upon arrival, they were attached to Sykes' Infantry (Reserve), Army of the Potomac.

At the Battle of Hanover Courthouse on May 27, 1862, the regiment played only a minor role. However, they fought in a more major role in the Battle of Gaines' Mill of the Seven Days Battles. As McClellan moved his base to the James River on June 27, 1862, the regiment fought against Gregg's South Carolina brigade. In a bayonet counterattack, the regiment defeated the initial Rebel attack driving back and routing two of the brigade's regiments.

=== The Virginia campaign ===
In August 1862, the regiment fell under the control of General John Pope. At the Second Battle of Bull Run (also known as the Second Battle of Manassas), the 5th New York Volunteer Infantry regiment was forced to withstand the advancing forces of General James Longstreet. In underestimating the size of the Confederate army, Pope ordered the regiment to support Hazlett's Battery. Longstreet's soldiers easily outnumbered the small regiment, met by the 5th Texas Vol. Of the famous Texas Brigade's who elite soldiers accurate musket volleys quickly inflicted massive casualties in the regiment. In just 10 minutes of fighting, the 5th New York lost 332 men of the approximately 525 engaged. At least 119 of the casualties were killed outright or died of their wounds. The addition of two missing who were never accounted for would bring the death total to 121. It was the greatest battle fatality sustained by any Federal infantry unit in the war. The entire Color Guard was killed, except for one man. The only officer to survive the battle was Captain Cleveland Winslow. The regiment was effectively removed as a combat regiment, never again serving in the battle line.

=== The Maryland, Fredericksburg, and Chancellorsville campaigns ===
Later, at the Battle of Antietam, September 17, the unit was held in reserve. On December 15, the unit fought at the Battle of Fredericksburg, covering the Union retreat. At the Battle of Chancellorsville under Joseph Hooker, the unit saw its final combat.

It returned to New York on May 8, 1863, and was mustered out on the next day, its three years' men having been transferred to the 146th New York Infantry Regiment.

During its term of service the Regiment had 2,164 men on its rolls, viz : two years' men, of original organization, 1,026, of whom 260 were with the regiment after the battle at Chancellorsville; recruits and volunteers on reorganization, 1,138, of whom 730 returned, including only about 100 of the original members of 1861.

== Affiliations, battle honors, detailed service, and casualties ==
=== Organizational affiliation ===
Attached to:

- Attached to Pierce's Brigade, Newport News, Va., Dept. of Virginia, to July 1861.
- Dix's Command, Baltimore, MD, to March 1862.
- Sykes' Infantry (Reserve), Army of the Potomac, to May 1862
- 3rd Brigade, Sykes' 2nd Division, V Corps, Army of the Potomac, to May 1863.

=== List of battles ===
The official list of battles in which the regiment bore a part:

- Battle of Big Bethel
- Siege of Yorktown
- Battle of Hanover Court House
- Battle of Gaines Mill
- Battle of Malvern Hill
- Second Battle of Bull Run (Note: The NPS has established these dates for the battle.)
- Battle of Antietam
- Battle of Fredericksburg
- Battle of Chancellorsville

=== Detailed service ===
==== 1861 ====
- Departed New York May 23
- Occupation of Newport News May 25 – July 26
- Action at Big Bethel, VA, June 10
- Moved to Baltimore, MD, July 26, and duty there till April 11, 1862.
- Expedition through Accomac and Northampton Counties, Va., November 14–22, 1861

==== 1862 ====
- Moved to the Peninsula, Va., April 11, 1862
- Siege of Yorktown, Va., April 15 – May 4
- Reconnaissance to near Hanover Court House May 26
- Hanover Court House May 27
- Operations about Hanover Court House May 27–29
- New Bridge June 5. Operations against Stuart June 13–15
- Old Church June 13
- Seven days before Richmond June 25 – July 1
- Battle of Mechanicsville June 26
- Battle of Gaines Mill June 27 (Note: verbatim from Dyer – "At Gaines Mill, under command of Lieut.-Col. Hiram Duryea, it faced a musketry fire which cut down one-third of its men and won praises from all who witnessed its remarkable efficiency and drill while in the thickest of that fight. It was in that battle that after having received several deadly volleys it paused at one time, while still under fire, to count off anew so that its movements might not be deranged by the absence of the fallen men. At Manassas it took into action 490 men of whom 117 were killed or mortally wounded.")
- White Oak Swamp and Turkey Bend June 30. Malvern Hill July 1
- Duty at Harrison's Landing till August 15
- Movement to Fortress Monroe, thence to Centreville August 15–28
- Pope's Campaign in Northern Virginia August 28 – September 2
- Battle of Bull Run August 30
- Maryland Campaign September 6–22
- Battle of Antietam September 16–17
- Shepherdstown Ford September 20
- Duty in Maryland to October 29
- Movement to Falmouth, Va., October 29 – November 19
- Battle of Fredericksburg December 12–15

==== 1863 ====
- "Mud March" January 20–24, 1863
- At Falmouth till April
- Chancellorsville Campaign April 27 – May 6
- Battle of Chancellorsville May 1–5
- Mustered out May 14, 1863, expiration of term
- Recruits assigned to 146th New York Infantry.

=== Total strength and casualties ===
During its service the regiment lost by death, killed in action, 4 officers, 126 enlisted men; of wounds received in action, 2 officers, 47 enlisted men; of disease and other causes, 37 enlisted men; total, 6 officers, 210 enlisted men; aggregate, 216.

== Commanders ==
- Colonel Abram Duryée – May 14 – September 10, 1861
- Colonel Gouverneur K. Warren – September 10, 1861 – September 26, 1862
- Colonel Hiram Duryea – September 17 – November 30, 1862
- Colonel Cleveland Winslow – December 5, 1862 – May 14, 1863

== Armament & uniforms ==
=== Armament ===
The 5th New York were issued the Model 1842 Springfield Muskets .69 caliber, smoothbore when accepted by the state on Monday, April 29, 1861. (Note: The smoothbore version was produced without sights (except for a cast one on the barrel band). Using a Buck and Ball cartridge, the smoothbore version of the 1842 musket was very effective during the American Civil War.) At Fortress Monroe, companies E and K exchanged, with the Commissary General, their muskets for Sharps Model 1859 breech-loading rifles (.52 caliber). At some time prior to the Fredericksburg campaign, the regiment exchanged their 1842 Springfield smoothbores for a mix of model 1855, 1861 National Armory (NA) and contract (Note: In government records, National Armory refers to one of three United States Armory and Arsenals, the Springfield Armory, the Harpers Ferry Armory, and the Rock Island Arsenal. Rifle-muskets, muskets, and rifles were manufactured in Springfield and Harper's Ferry before the war. When the Rebels destroyed the Harpers Ferry Armory early in the American Civil War and stole the machinery for the Confederate central government-run Richmond Armory, the Springfield Armory was briefly the only government manufacturer of arms, until the Rock Island Arsenal was established in 1862. During this time production ramped up to unprecedented levels ever seen in American manufacturing up until that time, with only 9,601 rifles manufactured in 1860, rising to a peak of 276,200 by 1864. These advancements would not only give the Union a decisive technological advantage over the Confederacy during the war but served as a precursor to the mass production manufacturing that contributed to the post-war Second Industrial Revolution and 20th century machine manufacturing capabilities. American historian Merritt Roe Smith has drawn comparisons between the early assembly machining of the Springfield rifles and the later production of the Ford Model T, with the latter having considerably more parts, but producing a similar numbers of units in the earliest years of the 1913–1915 automobile assembly line, indirectly due to mass production manufacturing advancements pioneered by the armory 50 years earlier. These rifles were also produced by contracted commercial arms companies who, by the contract, had to meet the NA manufacturing specifications.) rifle-muskets, a handful of Enfield Rifled Muskets, (Note: These were the standard rifle for the British army having performed well in the Crimean War. The Enfield was a .577 calibre Minié-type muzzle-loading rifled musket. It was used by both armies and was the second most widely used infantry weapon in the Union forces.) (.577 caliber, rifled) from stocks already in the State of New York's possession. (Note: These rifles had been manufactured by contract in 1856 in Windsor, Vermont by the Robbins and Lawrence Armory (R&L) and Connecticut and Massachusetts by Eli Whitney.The company had been able to sell gun making machinery (150 in all), to upgrade the new Enfield Armory in England. The British also awarded a later contract during the Crimean War for 25,000 Enfield P1853 and P1856 rifles. The contract's stiff penalty clause for missing the production schedule caused R&L to go bankrupt in 1859. Lamon, Goodnow and Yale (LG&Y) bought the factory to make sewing machines, but the onset of the war led them to continue producing the P1853 for the duration of the war. Eli Whitney bought some of the R&L bankruptcy inventory of incomplete P1853s, completed them, and sold them to New York.) The regiment reported the following surveys:

Fredericksburg

- A – 35 Springfield Rifled Muskets, model 1855, 1861, NA and contract, (.58 Cal.)
- B – 32 Springfield Rifled Muskets, model 1855, 1861, NA and contract, (.58 Cal.); 1 P53 Enfield Rifled Muskets (.58 and .577 Cal.)
- C – 43 Springfield Rifled Muskets, model 1855, 1861, NA and contract, (.58 Cal.)
- D – 34 Springfield Rifled Muskets, model 1855, 1861, NA and contract, (.58 Cal.); 2 P53 Enfield Rifled Muskets (.58 and .577 Cal.)
- E – 21 Springfield Rifled Muskets, model 1855, 1861, NA and contract, (.58 Cal.); 22 Sharps Model 1859 breech-loading rifles, triangular bayonet, (.52 caliber)
- F – 41 Springfield Rifled Muskets, model 1855, 1861, NA and contract, (.58 Cal.)
- G – 38 Springfield Rifled Muskets, model 1855, 1861, NA and contract, (.58 Cal.)
- H – unreported, probably Springfield Rifled Muskets, model 1855, 1861, NA and contract, (.58 Cal.)
- I – unreported, probably Springfield Rifled Muskets, model 1855, 1861, NA and contract, (.58 Cal.); probably Sharps Model 1859 breech-loading rifles, triangular bayonet, (.52 caliber)
- K – unreported, probably Springfield Rifled Muskets, model 1855, 1861, NA and contract, (.58 Cal.)

Chancellorsville

- A – 39 Springfield Rifled Muskets, model 1855, 1861, NA and contract, (.58 Cal.)
- B – 37 Springfield Rifled Muskets, model 1855, 1861, NA and contract, (.58 Cal.); 3 P53 Enfield Rifled Muskets (.58 and .577 Cal.)
- C – 38 Springfield Rifled Muskets, model 1855, 1861, NA and contract, (.58 Cal.); 9 P53 Enfield Rifled Muskets (.58 and .577 Cal.)
- D – 37 Springfield Rifled Muskets, model 1855, 1861, NA and contract, (.58 Cal.); 3 P53 Enfield Rifled Muskets (.58 and .577 Cal.)
- E – 22 Springfield Rifled Muskets, model 1855, 1861, NA and contract, (.58 Cal.); 20 Sharps Model 1859 breech-loading rifles, triangular bayonet, (.52 caliber)
- F – 43 Springfield Rifled Muskets, model 1855, 1861, NA and contract, (.58 Cal.); 3 P53 Enfield Rifled Muskets (.58 and .577 Cal.)
- G – 38 Springfield Rifled Muskets, model 1855, 1861, NA and contract, (.58 Cal.)
- H – 34 Springfield Rifled Muskets, model 1855, 1861, NA and contract, (.58 Cal.); 4 P53 Enfield Rifled Muskets (.58 and .577 Cal.)
- I – 1 Springfield Rifled Muskets, model 1855, 1861, NA and contract, (.58 Cal.); 40 Sharps Model 1859 breech-loading rifles, triangular bayonet, (.52 caliber)
- K – 40 Springfield Rifled Muskets, model 1855, 1861, NA and contract, (.58 Cal.); 3 P53 Enfield Rifled Muskets (.58 and .577 Cal.)

=== Shoulder Arms Gallery ===
Issued weapons

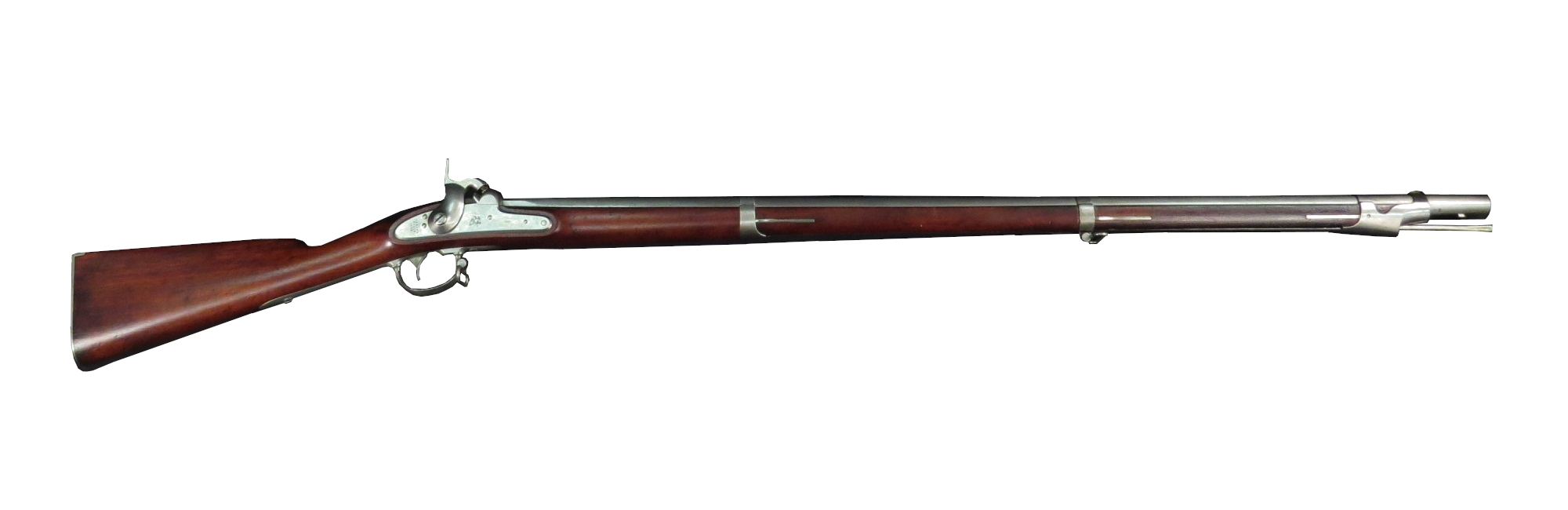
Model 1842 smoothbore musket

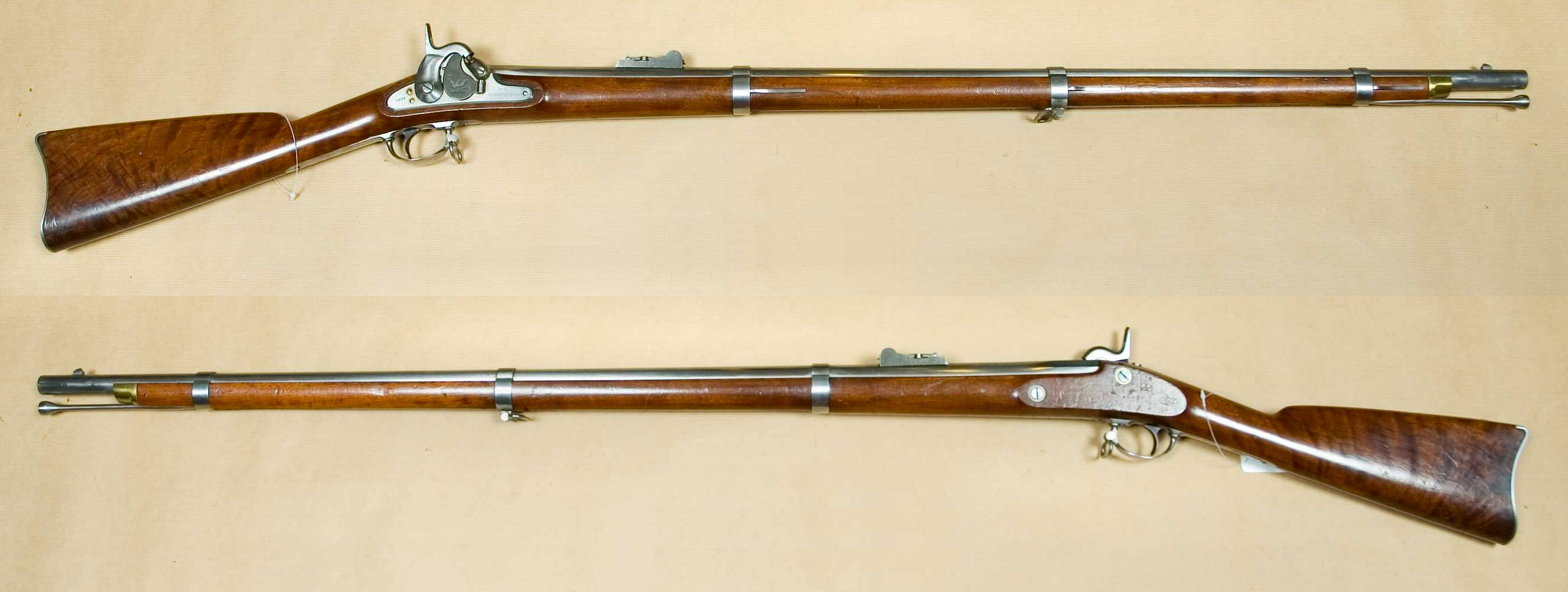
Springfield Model 1855

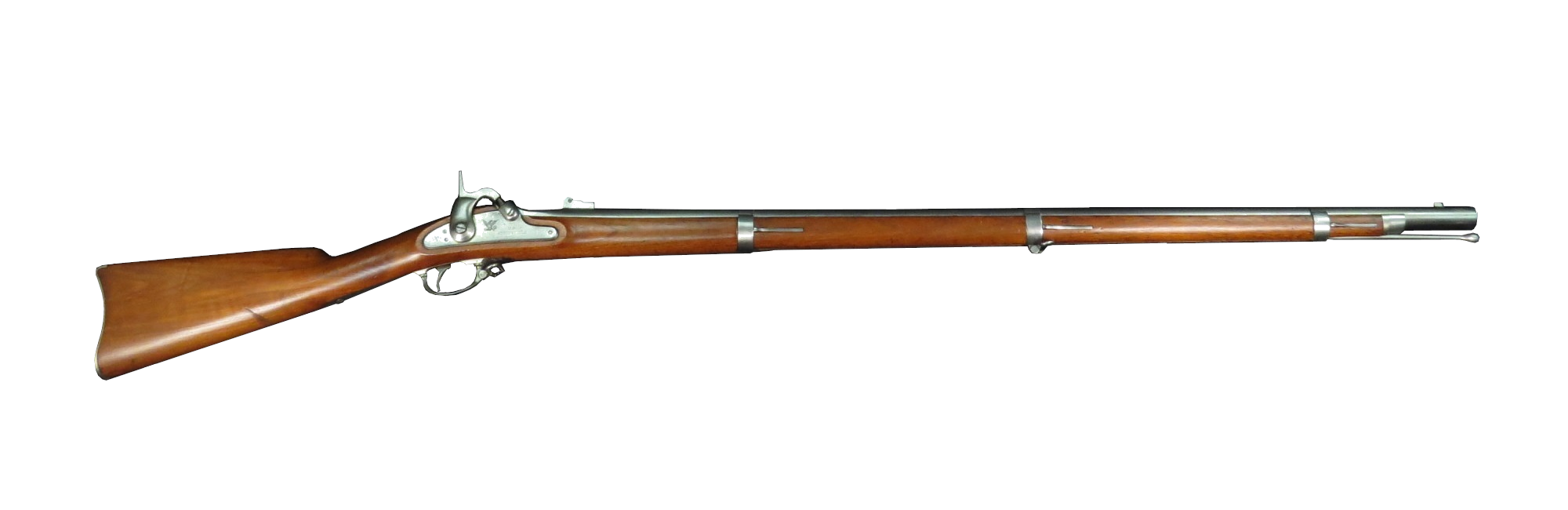
Springfield Model 1861

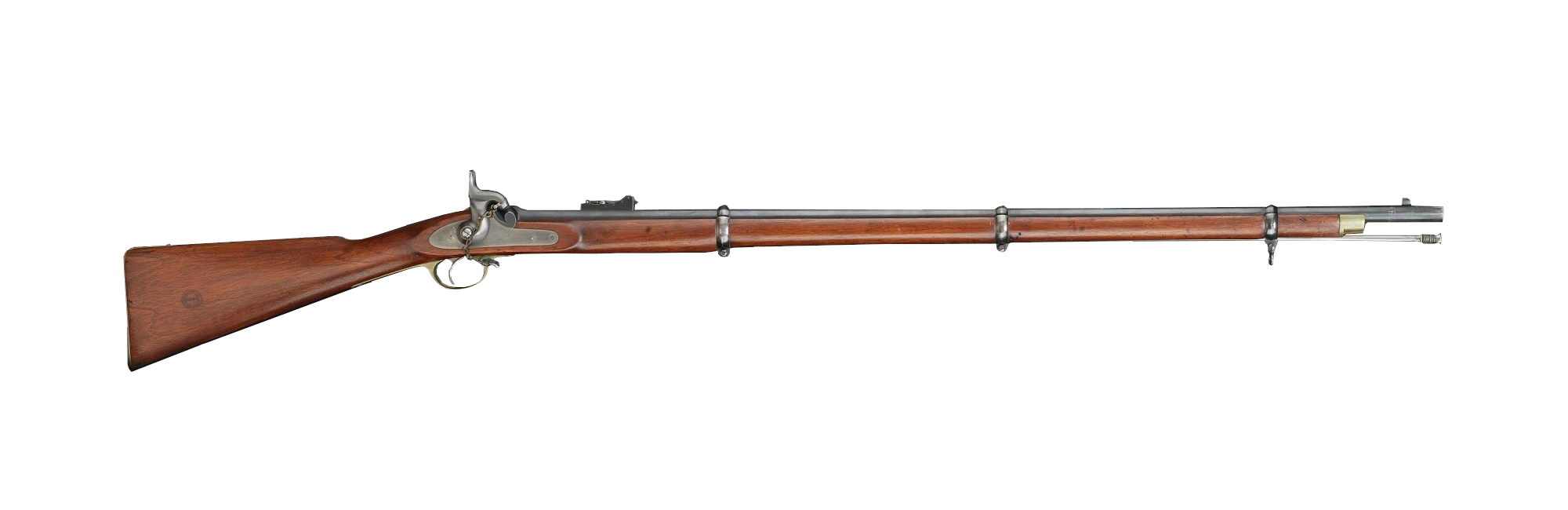
Pattern 1853 Enfield rifle-musket

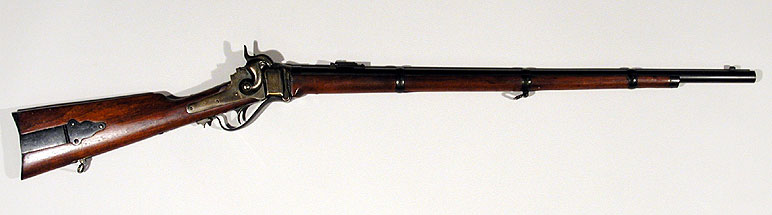
Sharps Model 1859

=== Uniform ===
Col. Duryée had previously commanded the 7th New York Militia and under his command had earned a national reputation for its drill and uniforms, ergo, he was determined to ensure that his regiment of volunteers would also be very well-trained and equipped. At the outset, he decided to model the regiment's uniforms on the Zouaves of the French army.

The enlisted men's uniforms of the 5th New York's were modeled closely on those of French Zouaves: a dark blue Zouave jacket with red trim, a dark blue shirt with red trim, a red Zouave sash with sky blue trim, extremely baggy red pantaloons, a red fez with a yellow tassel, white gaiters and leather jambières ("leggings"). The fezzes were usually worn with the white turban wrapped around them.

Officers wore the regulation dark blue frock coat with shoulder straps in infantry blue. They wore large, red trousers with unstriped outseam. Officers wore French-style red kepis with blue bands, and gold lace indicating rank.

The 165th New York Volunteer Infantry was regarded as a sister regiment and known as the "Second Battalion, Duryee Zouaves". The 165th wore the same uniform as the 5th with the exception of the tassel of the fez, which was dark blue instead of yellow-gold. Photographic evidence suggests that later in the war the 165th was given replacement sashes that were a solid red color without the light blue trim.

== Notable personnel ==
- Judson Kilpatrick – Captain commanding Company H from May 9 – August 12, 1861
- James Webb – Received the Medal of Honor on September 17, 1897, for actions as a Private with Company F during the Second Battle of Bull Run, August 30, 1862.

== Legacy ==
Colonel Cleveland Winslow of the 5th organized the 5th New York Veteran Volunteer Infantry after the original 5th mustered out. After a long and difficult recruiting period, the 5th Veterans joined the V Corps and fought in the final campaigns of the Virginia front.

In the fall of 1862, officers of the 5th detailed on recruiting duty had organized the 165th New York Volunteer Infantry, or "Second Battalion Duryee's Zouaves." The 165th served with the XIX Corps in Louisiana, in Virginia's Shenandoah Valley, and on occupation duty in Charleston, South Carolina, at war's end. The 3rd Annual Report of the Bureau of Military Statistics stated "...no other New York regiment gave so many officers to other commands."

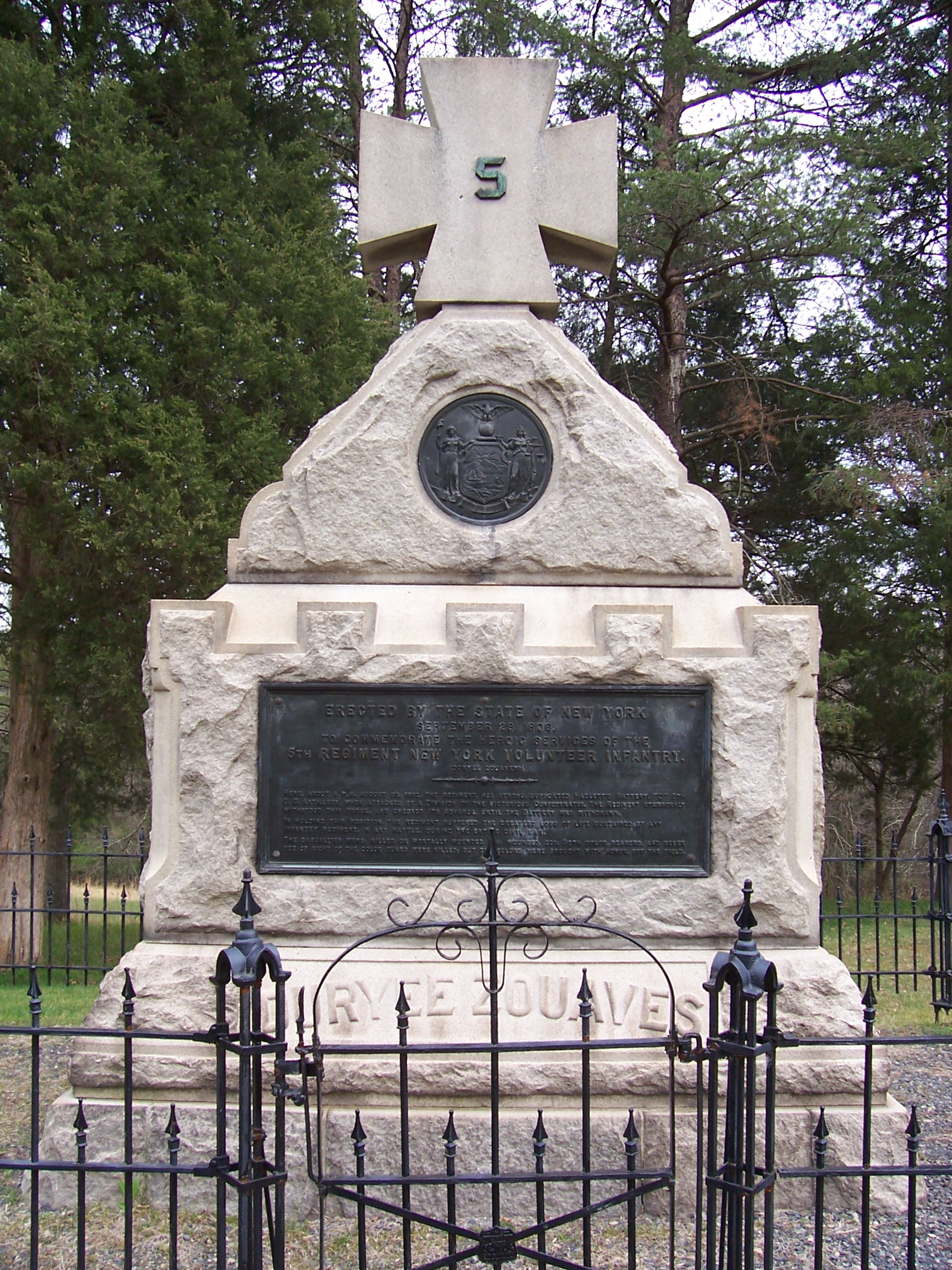
The memorial of the 5th New York Volunteer Infantry, erected at Manassas September 29, 1906.

Following the conclusion of the war, members of the 5th New York Veterans Association continued to hold monthly meetings. The veterans' association funded the creation of a statue to General Warren, their first commander, on Little Round Top at Gettysburg. They also erected a monument to the regiment at the scene of their greatest sacrifice on the battlefield of Second Bull Run (Manassas). The association also contributed to a monument to the Army of the Potomac's 5th Corps in Fredericksburg National Cemetery in Virginia.

== See also ==
- List of New York Civil War regiments
