= List of monuments of the Gettysburg Battlefield =

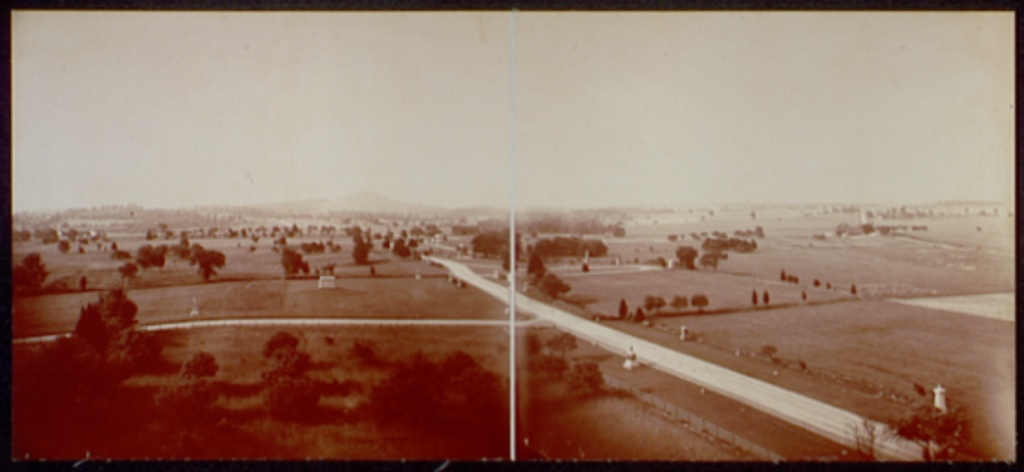
Gettysburg Battlefield, circa 1903, looking south along Cemetery Ridge and Hancock Avenue. The Equestrian Statue of General George Gordon Meade (1895) is left of center; the field of Pickett's Charge is right.

The monuments of the Gettysburg Battlefield commemorate the Battle of Gettysburg, which took place on July 1-3, 1863, during the American Civil War. Most are located within Gettysburg National Military Park; others are on private land at battle sites in and around Gettysburg, Pennsylvania. Together, they represent "one of the largest collections of outdoor sculpture in the world."

Park road system in 1998.

Most are listed as contributing structures within Gettysburg Battlefield Historic District, which was approved by the Keeper of the National Register of Historic Places on January 23, 2004.

As of 2008, the National Park Service unit managed 1,320 monuments and markers, 410 cannons, 148 historic buildings, and 41 miles (66 km) of roads (8 miles of them, unpaved). The largest concentration of monuments is at the Gettysburg National Cemetery, where President Abraham Lincoln gave his Gettysburg Address.

== About this list ==
- Confederate and Union monuments are listed separately.
- State monuments and monuments to individuals are listed alphabetically within their sections.
- Regimental monuments are grouped within a state's section by type: Artillery / Cavalry / Infantry / Other (engineers, militia, reserves, sharpshooters).
- Maryland has a section on both the Confederate and Union lists.
- Most of the listings include the monument's GPS coordinates.

== Confederate monuments ==
Confederate monuments
Name	Image	Location/GPS Coordinates	Designer/sculptor	Year	MN ID	Comments
Confederate States of America & State monuments
Alabama State Monument		Confederate lines facing Cemetery Ridge; 39.786535°N 77.254269°W	Joseph Urner, sculptor Hammaker Brothers, foundry	1933	MN 366	Commemorates Alabama's 16 infantry regiments, 1 infantry battalion, and two batteries who took part in the battle.
Arkansas State Monument		Confederate Avenue, at Biesecker Woods; 39.792652°N 77.255106°W	Reynolds Metal Company; Cobb Memorials	1966	MN 80	Inscription: "The grateful people of the state of Arkansas erect this memorial as an expression of their pride in the officers and men of the third Arkansas infantry, Confederate States Army, who by their valor and their blood have made this ground forever hallowed."
Army of Northern Virginia Marker		West Confederate Avenue		1908	MN 793	
Florida State Monument		West Confederate Avenue; 39.810098°N 77.254044°W	J. B. Hill, designer Bruns Monumental Company	1963	MN 73	
Georgia State Monument		West Confederate Avenue; 39.798862°N 77.255989°W		1961	MN 78	
Louisiana State Monument		West Confederate Avenue; 39.802958°N 77.255825°W	Donald De Lue, sculptor	1971	MN 76-C	
Mississippi State Monument		Confederate & Wheatfield Avenues; 39.80242°N 77.255873°W	Donald De Lue, sculptor	1973	MN 77-A	
North Carolina State Monument		West Confederate Avenue, facing Cemetery Ridge; 39.818351°N 77.24722°W	Gutzon Borglum, sculptor	1929	MN 71-F	Marks the spot where North Carolina troops began their part in Pickett's Charge
North Carolina Memorial Tablet; United Daughters of the Confederacy		West Confederate Avenue; 39.818458°N 77.247481°W	Unknown maker	1929		
Soldiers and Sailors of the Confederacy Monument		South Confederate Avenue; 39.784969°N 77.254039°W	Donald De Lue, sculptor Henry Dacy, architect	1965	MN 367	
South Carolina State Monument		Confederate Avenue; 39.797858°N 77.255924°W	J. B. Hill, designer Bruns Monumental Company	1963	MN 79-B	
Tennessee State Monument		West Confederate Avenue; 39.817682°N 77.247896°W	Michael Fitts, sculptor Decherd Marble & Granite Company	1982	MN 797	Designer: John Henry Price (Winchester, TN) Company: Decherd Marble and Granite Company (Decherd, TN)
Texas State Monument		South Confederate Avenue; 39.790007°N 77.254293°W	Harold B. Simpson, sculptor Stasswender Marble & Granite Works	1964	MN 82	
Virginia State Monument		West Confederate Avenue; 39.814163°N 77.25034°W	Frederick William Sievers, sculptor Tiffany and Company, foundry Van Amringe Granite Company	1917	MN 72-B	Erected near the place where Robert E. Lee watched the troops from Virginia engage in battle.
Monuments to individuals
Brigadier-General Lewis A. Armistead Marker "Armistead's Last Stand"		The Angle; 39.81319°N 77.23583°W		1887	MN 754	
Lieutenant-General Richard S. Ewell's Headquarters Marker		Hanover Road & 6th Street; 39.831117°N 77.219617°W		1920	MN 767	
Lieutenant-General Ambrose P. Hill's Headquarters Marker		West Confederate Avenue; 39.817933°N 77.248133°W		1920	MN 768	
General Robert E. Lee Equestrian Statue		Virginia State Monument, West Confederate Avenue; 39.814163°N 77.25034°W	Frederick William Sievers, sculptor Tiffany and Company, foundry Van Amringe Granite Company	1917	MN 72	
General Robert E. Lee's Headquarters Marker		south of Chambersburg Pike; 39.834833°N 77.2454°W	Cope, E.B.	1920	MN 765	
Lieutenant-General James Longstreet Equestrian Statue	More images	Pitzer Woods; 39.805726°N 77.256549°W	Gary Casteel sculptor	1998		
Lieutenant-General James Longstreet's Headquarters Marker		West Confederate Avenue; 39.800033°N 77.2564°W		1907	MN 766	
Monuments to specific units
Breathed's Battery Tablet		East Cavalry Field; 39.837017°N 77.168217°W	Cope, E.B.	1906	MN633	
Chambliss' Brigade Tablet		East Cavalry Field; 39.833583°N 77.172083°W	Cope, E.B.	1911	MN750	
Hampton's Brigade Tablet		East Cavalry Field; 39.836500°N 77.168833°W	Cope, E.B.	1911	MN746	
Jackson's Battery Tablet		East Cavalry Field; 39.834383°N 77.170533°W	Cope, E.B.	1906	MN635-C	
Jenkins' Brigade Tablet		East Cavalry Field; 39.832433°N 77.173833°W	Cope, E.B.	1911	MN749	
Lee's Brigade Tablet		East Cavalry Field; 39.838367°N 77.167000°W	Cope, E.B.	1911	MN747	
Louisiana Guard Artillery - Green's Battery		East Cavalry Field; 39.837917°N 77.167400°W				
McGregor's Battery Tablet		East Cavalry Field; 39.835683°N 77.169383°W	Cope, E.B.	1906	MN634-D	
Stuart's Horse Artillery Tablet		East Cavalry Field; 39.837433°N 77.168017°W				
Stuart's Cavalry Division Tablet		East Cavalry Field; 39.835033°N 77.170100°W	Cope, E.B.	1909	MN764	
ALABAMA
4th Alabama Infantry Marker		South Confederate Avenue; 39.787259°N 77.25412°W		1904	MN 791	
MARYLAND
2nd Maryland Infantry Monument		Slocum Avenue; 39.816695°N 77.218242°W	Flaharty & Rummel	1886	MN 328-C	
MISSISSIPPI
11th Mississippi Infantry Monument		West Confederate Avenue; 39.819641°N 77.247065°W	William Beckwith, sculptor	2000	MN 833	The statue portrays Color-Sergeant William O'Brien
11th Mississippi Infantry Regiment Marker		Cemetery Ridge, north of The Angle; 39.784969°N 77.254039°W		2000		Location just west of the Brian stone wall defended by Union soldiers and "marks the spot" 14 of the Mississippians achieved during Pickett's Charge.
NORTH CAROLINA
26th North Carolina Infantry Monument		The Angle; 39.813574°N 77.235641°W	Edward Bouldin, designer	1986	MN 801	
26th North Carolina Infantry Monument		Meredith Avenue, Herbst Woods; 39.834715°N 77.254605°W	Unknown sculptor	1985	MN 799	
43rd North Carolina Infantry Monument		East Confederate Avenue; 39.818568°N 77.215501°W	Unknown sculptor	1988	MN 805	
SOUTH CAROLINA
Kershaw's Brigade Marker; 2nd, 3rd, 7th, 8th & 15th South Carolina Infantry Regiments		Emmitsburg Road; 39.798233°N 77.251683°W		1970	MN 391	
TEXAS
Texas Brigade Monument; Hood's Texas Brigade Monument; Robertson Brigade Monument		South Confederate Avenue; 39.790248°N 77.254402°W	Unknown maker	1913	MN 81	

== United States monuments ==
United States monuments
Name	Image	Location/GPS Coordinates	Designer	Year	MN ID	Comments
United States of America & State monuments
Army of the Potomac Marker		Hancock Avenue at The Angle	J. Otto Schweizer, sculptor E. B. Cope, architect	1908	MN 820	Arched granite stele with bronze plaque and shield.
Delaware State Monument		Taneytown Road; 39.8161°N 77.23247°W	Ron Tunison, sculptor	2000	MN 832	
Indiana State Monument		Spangler's Meadow, near Culp's Hill; 39.814138°N 77.216287°W	Al Yeager, sculptor Codori Memorials	1971	MN 338	
New York State Monument	More images	National Cemetery; 39.8208°N 77.2306°W	Marshall & Walter, designer Caspar Buberl, sculptor Henry-Bonnard Bronze Company	1893	MN 289	Includes a bronze bas relief at the base of the column.
New York Auxiliary State Monument		South Hancock Avenue; 39.8043°N 77.23445°W	Edward Pearce Casey, architect Gerome Brush, sculptor Swenson Granite Company	1925	MN 267	
Pennsylvania State Memorial		Cemetery Ridge, Hancock Avenue; 39.807588°N 77.235153°W	W. Liance Cottrell, architect Samuel Murray, sculptor	1910	MN 260	Union state
United States Regulars Monument		Hancock Avenue; 39.811217°N 77.235683°W	Karl Bitter, sculptor Van Amringe Granite Company	1909	MN 235	
United States Signal Corps Marker		Little Round Top; 39.79254°N 77.236503°W		1919	MN 403	
Vermont State Monument "Stannard's Vermont Brigade Monument"		Hancock Avenue; 39.80945°N 77.23636°W	Karl Gerhardt sculptor Frederick & Field	1889	MN 250	The Corinthian column is topped by a bronze statue of Brigadier-General George Stannard.
Monuments to individuals
Brigadier-General Francis Barlow Statue		Howard Avenue at Barlow's Knoll; 39.84545°N 77.22642°W	Edward Pearce Casey, architect John Massey Rhind, sculptor Roman Bronze Works; John Swenson Granite Company	1922	MN 67	
Major-General John Buford Statue		McPherson Ridge, Chambersburg Pike; 39.83795°N 77.25164°W	James Edward Kelly, sculptor Henry-Bonnard Bronze Company	1895	MN 30-D	Union commander, divisional
John L. Burns Statue		McPherson Ridge, Stone-Meredith Avenue; 39.83595°N 77.25273°W	Albert Bureau	1903	MN 33	
Captain Jedediah Chapman Marker; 27th Connecticut Infantry		Wheatfield, DeTrobiand Avenue; 39.796167°N 77.245483°W		1879	MN 769	
Father William Corby Statue; Chaplain of the 88th New York Infantry/Irish Brigade		South Hancock Avenue; 39.80345°N 77.23438°W	Samuel Murray, sculptor	1910	MN 269-A	The statue was placed on the same rock on which Father Corby stood while granting absolution to troops before battle on July 2, 1863. A replica of the statue is at the University of Notre Dame.
Brigadier-General Samuel W. Crawford Statue		Crawford Avenue; 39.795737°N 77.23881°W	Ron Tunison, sculptor Tallix, foundry	1988	MN 803	
First Lieutenant Alonzo Cushing Marker; Battery A, 4th United States Artillery		The Angle, Hancock Avenue; 39.813150°N 77.235733°W		1887	MN 394	On November 6, 2014, President Barack Obama posthumously awarded the Medal of Honor to First Lieutenant Alonzo Cushing (1841–1863).
Major-General Thomas Devin Relief Portrait; 6th New York Cavalry Monument		Buford Avenue; 39.844572°N 77.247159°W	James Edward Kelly, sculptor	1889	MN 3	
Major-General Abner Doubleday Statue		McPherson Ridge, South Reynolds Avenue; 39.83303°N 77.25075°W	J. Massey Rhind, sculptor	1917	MN 44	Union commander, corps
Major-General Abner Doubleday's Headquarters Marker; 1st Corps Headquarters Marker		South Reynolds Avenue; 39.83558°N 77.249578°W		1913	MN ?	1st Corps commander Major-General John F. Reynolds was mortally wounded on July 1, the first day of the battle. Major-General Doubleday assumed command, serving one day. Major-General John Newton was installed as 1st Corps commander on July 2.
Colonel Augustus van Horne Ellis Statue; 124th New York Infantry Monument		Houck's Ridge, Sickles Avenue; 39.792376°N 77.242274°W	Maurice J. Power; P. B. Laird	1884	MN 129	Colonel Ellis was killed in the battle.
Captain Henry V. Fuller Marker; 64th New York Infantry		Rose Woods, Brooke Avenue; 39.794847°N 77.245179°W		1894	MN 395	
Brigadier-General John Geary Statue		Culp's Hill, Slocum & Geary Avenues; 39.817226°N 77.219926°W	J. Otto Schweizer, sculptor Van Amringe Granite Company	1915	MN 348	
Brigadier-General John Gibbon Statue		Hancock Avenue; 39.81102°N 77.2354°W	Terry Jones, sculptor Laran Bronze, Inc.	1988	MN 802	A statue of General Gibbon was recommended in 1913, but it took 75 years to realize.
General George S. Greene Statue		Culp's Hill; 39.819865°N 77.220127°W	Roland Hinton Perry, sculptor Bureau Brothers Foundry	1907	MN 317	Union commander, brigade
Major-General Winfield S. Hancock's Headquarters Marker; 2nd Corps Headquarters Marker		Pleasonton Avenue; 39.808258°N 77.23489°W				
Major-General Winfield S. Hancock Equestrian Statue		Cemetery Hill, Baltimore Pike; 39.82132°N 77.228877°W	Francis Edwin Elwell, sculptor Bureau Brothers Foundry; Smith Granite Company	1896	MN 300	
Major-General Winfield S. Hancock Wounded Marker		South Hancock Avenue; 39.808769°N 77.237076°W	Smith Granite Company	1892	MN 251	
General Alexander Hays Statue; 63rd Pennsylvania Infantry		Ziegler's Grove, Hancock Avenue; 39.816829°N 77.234547°W	J. Otto Schweizer, sculptor Gorham Manufacturing Company, foundry Van Amringe Granite Company	circa 1914	MN 207	
Major-General Oliver Otis Howard Equestrian Statue		East Cemetery Hill, Baltimore Pike; 39.821948°N 77.228877°W	Robert Ingersoll Aitken, sculptor	1932	MN 305	Union cmdr, corps
Major-General Oliver Otis Howard's Headquarters Marker; 11th Corps Headquarters Marker		Cemetery Hill, Howard Avenue; 39.821510°N 77.228713°W				
Brigadier-General Albion P. Howe's Headquarters Marker		Taneytown Road & Howe Avenue; 39.784027°N 77.229928°W		1905	MN 398	A bronze plaque affixed to a boulder.
Reverend Horatio S. Howell Memorial; Chaplain of the 90th Pennsylvania Volunteer Infantry Regiment		Christ Evangelical Lutheran Church, Chambersburg Street; 39.830824°N 77.232592°W	Unknown sculptor	1889	MN 399	Exiting after Sunday Mass, Chaplain Howell was shot and killed on the steps of the church.
Sergeant Amos Humiston Marker; 154th New York Infantry		Stratton Street; 39.83205°N 77.228715°W		1993	MN ?	Months after the battle, Sergeant Humiston's corpse was identified through the photograph of his children that he clutched in his hand.
Brigadier-General Andrew Atkinson Humphreys Statue		Emmitsburg Road; 39.8082°N 77.243889°W	J. Otto Schweizer, sculptor Gorham Manufacturing Company, foundry Van Amringe Granite Company	1919	MN 201	
Brigadier-General Henry Jackson Hunt's Headquarters Marker		Taneytown Road, south of Leister House; 39.813617°N 77.231783°W	E. B. Cope, architect	1920		
Major-General George Meade Equestrian Statue		Cemetery Ridge, Hancock Avenue; 39.813881°N 77.23481°W	H. K. Bush-Brown, sculptor	1895	MN 690	Union cmdr, army
Major-General George Meade's Headquarters Marker; Army of the Potomac Headquarters Marker		Taneytown Road, south of Leister Farm; 39.814472°N 77.232111°W	E. B. Cope, architect	1920	MN 450	A bronze cannon barrel atop a stone base. One of 10 similar Union headquarters markers.
Lieutenant-Colonel Henry C. Merwin Marker; 27th Connecticut Infantry		Wheatfield Road; 39.797567°N 77.2409°W		1880	MN 770	
Major-General John Newton's Headquarters Marker; 1st Corps Headquarters Marker		Pleasonton Avenue; 39.807784°N 77.231656°W		1913		1st Corps commander Major-General John F. Reynolds was mortally wounded on July 1, the first day of the battle. Major-General Abner Doubleday assumed command, serving one day. Major-General Newton was installed as 1st Corps commander on July 2.
Colonel Patrick H. O'Rorke Relief Bust; 140th New York Infantry Monument		Little Round Top; 39.791284°N 77.237089°W	J. G. Hamilton, sculptor Smith Granite Company	1889	MN 94	
Major Joshua G. Palmer Marker; 66th Ohio Volunteer Infantry		Culp's Hill, Slocum Avenue; 39.820100°N 77.219450°W		1887	MN 771	
Brevet-Lieutenant William Brooke Rawle Memorial Flagpole; 3rd Pennsylvania Cavalry		East Cavalry Field, Gregg Avenue; 39.827748°N 77.168219°W		1909	MN 789	
Major-General John F. Reynolds Equestrian Statue		McPherson Ridge, Chambersburg Pike at Stone-Meredith Avenue; 39.837899°N 77.251284°W	H. K. Bush-Brown, sculptor [[Bureau Brothers Foundry][Smith Granite Company]]	1898	MN 28	Union cmdr, corps
Major-General John F. Reynolds Statue		National Cemetery; 39.8213°N 77.23033°W	John Quincy Adams Ward, sculptor Robert Wood & Company, foundry	1872	MN 291	Union commander, corps
Major-General John F. Reynolds Killed Marker		Herbst Woods, Reynolds Avenue; 39.834392°N 77.250954°W		1886	MN 41	Union commander, corps
Brigadier-General John Cleveland Robinson Statue		Doubleday & Robinson Avenues; 39.843464°N 77.241886°W	J. Massey Rhind, sculptor Jonathan Williams, Inc., foundry Worden-Gilboy Company (base)	1917	MN 10	
Major-General John Sedgwick Equestrian Statue		Munshower Knoll, Sedgwick Avenue; 39.796224°N 77.233863°W	H. K. Bush-Brown, sculptor Bureau Brothers Foundry; Davis Granite Company	1913	MN 112	
Major-General John Sedgwick's Headquarters Marker; 6th Corps Headquarters Marker		Sedgwick Avenue; 39.797200°N 77.234483°W				
Major-General Daniel E. Sickles's Headquarters Marker; 3rd Corps Headquarters Marker		Trostle Farm, United States Avenue; 39.802544°N 77.242773°W				
Major-General Daniel E. Sickles Wounded Marker		United States Avenue, near Trostle Barn; 39.802544°N 77.242773°W	Unknown sculptor	circa 1901	MN 193	
Major-General Henry Slocum Equestrian Statue		Stevens' Knoll, Slocum Avenue; 39.819128°N 77.224588°W	Edward Clark Potter, sculptor Gorham Manufacturing Company, foundry	1902	MN 312	
Major-General Henry Slocum's Headquarters Marker		Powers' Hill, Baltimore Pike; 39.807983°N 77.217833°W	Emmor Cope	1913	MN 458	
Brigadier-General George Stannard Statue		Vermont State Monument (Stannard Vermont Brigade Monument); Hancock Avenue; 39.80945°N 77.23636°W	Karl Gerhardt sculptor Frederick & Field	1889	MN 250	
Major-General George Sykes's Headquarters Marker; 5th Corps Headquarters Marker		Sedgwick Avenue; 39.797200°N 77.234483°W				
Colonel Charles F. Taylor Marker; 13th Pennsylvania Reserves Regiment		Ayres Avenue; 39.795601°N 77.241234°W		1905	MN 393	Colonel Taylor, of Kennett Square, Pennsylvania, at age 23 was the youngest colonel in the Union Army. Killed July 3, 1863.
Brigadier-General Strong Vincent Statue; 83rd Pennsylvania Infantry Monument		Little Round Top; 39.789957°N 77.236969°W	S. J. O'Kelley, sculptor, P. F. Eisenbrown & Sons Company, Reading, PA	1889	MN 91	
Brigadier-General Strong Vincent Marker		Little Round Top; 39.7906598°N 77.236921°W	Codori Memorials	1878	MN 92	
Col. Strong Vincent Fell Here Marker		Little Round Top; 39.791283°N 77.237017°W				
Brigadier-General James S. Wadsworth Statue		McPherson Ridge, North Reynolds Avenue; 39.83829°N 77.24769°W	Roland Hinton Perry, sculptor	1914	MN 24	Union commander, divisional
Brigadier-General James S. Wadsworth's Division Tablet		McPherson Ridge, North Reynolds Avenue; 39.836833°N 77.248717°W	Emmor Cope	1909	MN 426	
Colonel George Hull Ward Marker; 15th Massachusetts Infantry		Emmitsburg Road; 39.812239°N 77.238737°W	Boston Marble & Granite Company	1886	MN 817	
Brigadier-General G. K. Warren Statue		Little Round Top; 39.792516°N 77.236683°W	Karl Gerhardt, sculptor Henry-Bonnard Bronze Company	1888	MN 99	
Brigadier-General Alexander Stewart Webb Statue		Hancock Avenue; 39.81296°N 77.23537°W	J. Massey Rhind, sculptor Jonathan Williams, Inc., foundry Worden-Crawford Company	1915	MN 224	
Weed and Hazlett Monument (originally 91st Pennsylvania Volunteer Infantry Monument)		Little Round Top; 39.792121°N 77.236583°W	Schell, contractor	1889	MN 96	Honors Brigadier-General Stephen H. Weed and Lieutenant Charles E. Hazlett who were both shot near this spot.
Major-General William Wells Statue		Plum Run Valley; 39.78504°N 77.245761°W	J. Otto Schweizer, sculptor Gorham Manufacturing Company, foundry Van Amringe Granite Company	1914	MN 371	Union commander, battalion
Colonel George L. Willard Monument; 125th New York Infantry		near Plum Run; 39.80635°N 77.238975°W		1888	MN 397	Monument to Colonel Willard, who died in the battle.
Brigadier-General Samuel K. Zook Monument		Wheatfield Road; 39.798416°N 77.242559°W	H. A. Dorr Company	1882	MN 168	In an 1894 photograph.
Monuments to specific units
UNITED STATES
Custer's Brigade Tablet		East Cavalry Field; 39.826633°N 77.165150°W	Cope, E.B.	1911	MN521	
Gregg's Brigade Tablet		East Cavalry Field; 39.818133°N 77.169433°W	Cope, E.B.	1911	MN519	
McIntosh's Brigade Tablet		East Cavalry Field; 39.825900°N 77.163067°W	Cope, E.B.	1911	MN517	
Neill's Brigade Tablet		Neill Avenue; 39.808017°N 77.209733°W	Cope, E.B.	1912	MN500	
Tidball's Brigade Tablet		East Cavalry Field; 39.820233°N 77.166667°W	Cope, E.B.	1911	MN530	
5th Army Corps Headquarters Marker		Sedgwick Avenue, north of Wheatfield Road; 39.79827°N 77.2347°W	Unknown sculptor	1898	MN 400	
Battery A, 4th United States Artillery Monument		The Angle; 39.813171°N 77.235814°W				
Battery B, 4th United States Artillery Monument		North of Chambersburg Road; 39.835689°N 77.245881°W	Cope, E.B.	1908	MN675-B	Lt. James Stewart commanding
Battery C, 5th United States Artillery Monument		Hancock Avenue; 39.81005°N 77.23598°W				
Battery D, 5th United States Artillery Monument		Little Round Top; 39.792059°N 77.236599°W				
Battery E, 4th United States Artillery Monument		Bushman Woods; 39.783092°N 77.246444°W	Cope, E.B.	1908	MN677-A	Lt. Samuel S. Elder's section
Batteries E & G, 1st United States Artillery Monument		East Cavalry Field; 39.821417°N 77.164733°W	Cope, E.B.	1908	MN660-A	Lt. James Chester's section
Batteries E & G, 1st United States Artillery Monument		East Cavalry Field; 39.819033°N 77.168567°W	Cope, E.B.	1907	MN661-D	Lt. Ernest L. Kinney's section
Battery K, 5th United States Artillery Monument		Culp's Hill; 39.820074°N 77.220294°W				
Battery K, 5th United States Artillery Monument		Baltimore Pike; 39.81299°N 77.22369°W				
Battery M, 2nd United States Artillery		East Cavalry Field; 39.818333°N 77.169283°W	Cope, E.B.	1907	MN670-B	
Companies A, B, D & H, 1st United States Sharpshooters Monument "New York Sharpshooters"		Berdan Avenue; 39.807994°N 77.257555°W	Frederick & Field	1889	MN 75-B	
Companies C, I & K, 1st United States Sharpshooters and Company B, 2nd United States Sharpshooters Monument "Michigan Sharpshooters"		Little Round Top; 39.791181°N 77.237672°W	Smith Granite Company	1889	MN 98	
Company E, 1st United States Sharpshooters and Companies F & G, 2nd United States Sharpshooters "Berdan's Sharpshooters"; New Hampshire Sharpshooters Monument		Hancock Avenue; 39.808079°N 77.23618°W	Thomas Nahn, contractor	1893	MN 262	"The monument marks the position held by Company E, 1st New Hampshire Sharpshooters on July 3, 1863."
Company F, 1st United States Sharpshooters Monument "Vermont Sharpshooters"		Pitzer Woods, Berdan Avenue; 39.80812°N 77.257118°W	F. Moynehan, sculptor	1898	MN 74	
Company G, 1st United States Sharpshooters Monument "Wisconsin Sharpshooters"		Emmitsburg Road; 39.80805°N 77.2444°W	Ryegate Granite Company	1888	MN 198-A	
Company D, 2nd United States Sharpshooters Monument "Maine Sharpshooters"		Granite Farm Lane; 39.790617°N 77.250117°W	Unknown maker	1889	MN 83	
Companies E & H, 2nd United States Sharpshooters Monument "Vermont Sharpshooters"		Granite Farm Lane; 39.788971°N 77.246873°W	F. Moynehan, sculptor	1889	MN 84	
CONNECTICUT
2nd Connecticut Light Artillery Battery Monument		Hancock Avenue; 39.80375°N 77.2346°W	Unknown sculptor	1889	MN 268-B	
5th Connecticut Infantry Monument		Slocum Avenue, south of Culp's Hill; 39.815562°N 77.217394°W	Smith Granite Company	1887	MN 331	
14th Connecticut Infantry Monument		North Hancock Avenue; 39.81384°N 77.23543°W	John Flaherty, sculptor	1884	MN 217-F	
14th Connecticut Infantry Marker		Bliss Barn site, Emmitsburg Road; 39.8164°N 77.24205°W		1884	MN ?	
17th Connecticut Infantry Monument		Barlow's Knoll, Howard Avenue; 39.84544°N 77.2262°W	W. H. Curtis, sculptor	1884	MN 69	
17th Connecticut Infantry Monument		East Cemetery Hill; 39.822632°N 77.228115°W	Unknown sculptor	1889	MN 296	
17th Connecticut Infantry Memorial Flagpole		Barlow's Knoll, Howard Avenue; 39.84561°N 77.22617°W	Walworth Manufacturing Company, Boston, MA	1902	MN 790	
20th Connecticut Infantry Monument		Slocum Avenue; 39.81595°N 77.21786°W	Curtis & Hughes; Millstone Quarries	1885	MN 330	
27th Connecticut Infantry Monument		Wheatfield Road; 39.797069°N 77.241558°W	St. Johnsbury Granite Company	1885	MN 136-A	Marks the spot where Colonel Henry Merwin was shot.
27th Connecticut Infantry Monument		Brooke Avenue; 39.79535°N 77.247073°W	Unknown sculptor	1889	MN 144	
DELAWARE
1st Delaware Infantry Monument		North Hancock Avenue; 39.8146°N 77.235455°W	Thomas Davidson	1886	MN 215-A	
1st Delaware Infantry Marker						
2nd Delaware Infantry Monument		Brooke Avenue; 39.79485°N 77.2468°W	Thomas Davidson	1886 relocated 1909	MN 143-A	
ILLINOIS
First Shot Marker; 8th Illinois Cavalry Marker		Ephraim Wisler House, 1495 West Chambersburg Pike; 39.850964°N 77.280727°W	Smith Granite Company	1886	MN 1	8th Illinois Cavalry veterans gathered around the First Shot Marker at the 50th anniversary of the battle, 1913.
8th Illinois Cavalry Monument		Reynolds Avenue; 39.835796°N 77.249447°W	Smith Granite Company	1891	MN 39	
12th Illinois Cavalry Monument		North Reynolds Avenue; 39.837082°N 77.248556°W	Smith Granite Company	1891	MN 20	
82nd Illinois Infantry Monument		West Howard Avenue; 39.84283°N 77.23235°W	New England Granite Works (ordered by Triebel & Sons)	1891	MN 58	
INDIANA
3rd Indiana Cavalry Monument		North Reynolds Avenue; 39.837912°N 77.24784°W	A. A. McKain, sculptor	1885	MN 23	
7th Indiana Infantry Monument		Culp's Hill; 39.820294°N 77.22049°W	Unknown sculptor	1885	MN 313	
14th Indiana Infantry Monument		Baltimore Pike; 39.821462°N 77.228906°W	A. A. McKain, sculptor	1885	MN 308-B	
19th Indiana Infantry Monument		Stone-Meredith Avenue at Herbst Woods; 39.834178°N 77.254237°W	Whitehead & Wright	1885	MN 37	
20th Indiana Infantry Monument		South Slocum Avenue; 39.79486°N 77.242765°W	A. W. Ayres & Son	1888	MN 141	Dedication of the monument, 1885.
27th Indiana Infantry Marker		East Confederate Avenue; 39.814267°N 77.216017°W	Unknown sculptor	1885	MN ?	Marks the regiment's position on July 3, 1863
27th Indiana Infantry Monument		Culp's Hill; 39.81353°N 77.215957°W		1890	MN 339-C	
MAINE
Hall's Battery, 2nd Maine Artillery Monument		Chambersburg Pike at Stone-Meredith Avenue; 39.837848°N 77.251547°W	Unknown sculptor	1889	MN 29-G	
Hall's Battery, 2nd Maine Artillery Marker		National Cemetery; 39.81755°N 77.23155°W			MN ?	
Stevens' Battery, 5th Maine Artillery Monument		Stevens' Knoll, Slocum Avenue; 39.81935°N 77.224564°W	Unknown sculptor	1889	MN 311-H	
Stevens' Battery, 5th Maine Artillery Marker		Lutheran Theological Seminary, Seminary Lane; 39.833741°N 77.244946°W		1889	MN ?	Position on July 1, 1863.
Dow's Battery, 6th Maine Artillery Battery Monument		Hancock Avenue; 39.803292°N 77.234534°W	Unknown sculptor	1889	MN 270-D	
1st Maine Cavalry Monument		Hanover Road; 39.81795°N 77.169235°W	Unknown sculptor	1889	MN 382	
3rd Maine Infantry Monument		Peach Orchard, Birney Avenue; 39.800411°N 77.250067°W	Unknown sculptor	1889	MN 175-D	
3rd Maine Infantry Marker		Berdan Avenue; 39.808004°N 77.257255°W			MN ?	
3rd Maine Infantry Marker		Hancock Avenue; 39.81249°N 77.23529°W			MN ?	
4th Maine Infantry Monument		Crawford Avenue at Devil's Den; 39.791882°N 77.241421°W	Unknown maker	1889	MN 126-C	
4th Maine Infantry Marker		Hancock Avenue; 39.812491°N 77.23529°W				
5th Maine Infantry Monument		South Sedgwick Avenue; 39.795311°N 77.235006°W	Unknown maker	1889	MN 106-D	
6th Maine Infantry Monument		Howe Avenue; 39.783435°N 77.228407°W	Hallowell Granite Company	1889	MN 378	
7th Maine Infantry Monument		Neill Avenue at Wolf Hill; 39.807889°N 77.210646°W	Unknown sculptor	1889	MN 361-B	
10th Maine Volunteer Infantry Regiment Monument "10th Maine Battalion"		Baltimore Pike; 39.811509°N 77.220723°W	Hallowell Granite Company	1889	MN 354	
16th Maine Infantry Monument		Oak Ridge, west of Doubleday Avenue; 39.841588°N 77.242832°W	Unknown sculptor	1889	MN 15-E	
16th Maine Infantry Marker		Doubleday Avenue; 39.844555°N 77.241985°W			MN ?	
17th Maine Infantry Monument		DeTrobriand Avenue; 39.795746°N 77.244412°W	Hallowell Granite Company	1889	MN 150-C	Detail of the infantryman atop the monument.
17th Maine Infantry Position Marker		Hancock Avenue; 39.807961°N 77.236087°W	Unknown sculptor	1889	MN ?	
19th Maine Infantry Monument		Hancock Avenue; 39.81106°N 77.23612°W	Unknown sculptor	1889	MN 236-D	
20th Maine Infantry Monument		Little Round Top; 39.789476°N 77.236146°W	Unknown maker	1886	MN 89-B	A replica of the Gettysburg 20th Maine Infantry Monument is at Chamberlain Freedom Park in Brewer, Maine.
20th Maine Infantry Monument		Big Round Top; 39.786642°N 77.239544°W	Unknown sculptor	1889	MN 372-B	Marks regiment's position on the night of July 2, 1863.
Maine Sharpshooters Monument (Company D, 2nd United States Sharpshooters)		Granite Farm Lane; 39.790617°N 77.250117°W	Unknown maker	1889	MN 83	
MARYLAND
Battery A, Maryland Artillery Monument "Rigby's Battery"		Powers' Hill, Granite Schoolhouse Lane; 39.806067°N 77.219433°W	Standard Granite Quarries; J. Regester & Son, foundry	1888	MN 359-A	
1st Maryland Cavalry Monument		East Cavalry Field; 39.825123°N 77.162933°W	Standard Granite Quarries; J. Regester & Son, foundry	1890	MN 388	
Purnell Legion, Company A, Maryland Cavalry Monument		East Cavalry Field; 39.826459°N 77.164611°W	Frederick & Field	1890	MN 285	
1st Maryland Volunteer Infantry, Eastern Shore Brigade Monument		Slocum Avenue; 39.81917°N 77.2197°W	Frederick & Field	1888	MN 318-B	
1st Maryland Volunteer Infantry, Potomac Home Brigade Monument		Slocum Avenue; 39.814727°N 77.216718°W	Frederick & Field; J. Regester & Son, foundry	1888	MN 335-B	
3rd Maryland Volunteer Infantry Monument		Slocum Avenue; 39.815867°N 77.217838°W	P. F. Eisenbrown, Eagle Granite Works; J. Regester & Son, foundry	1888	MN 334-B	
MASSACHUSETTS
1st Massachusetts Light Artillery Battery Monument		National Cemetery; 39.817729°N 77.231599°W	Smith Granite Company	1885	MN 282-A	
3rd Massachusetts Artillery Battery Monument		Althoff Lane; 39.79673°N 77.238083°W	Smith Granite Company	1885	MN 117-B	
5th Massachusetts Artillery Battery Monument		Wheatfield Avenue; 39.8006°N 77.2469°W	Smith Granite Company	1885	MN 170-B	
9th Massachusetts Artillery Battery Monument		Trostle Farm, near United States Avenue; 39.80165°N 77.24248°W	Boston Marble & Granite Company	1885	MN 194-B	
9th Massachusetts Artillery Battery Monument "Bigelow's Battery"		Ziegler's Grove, Hancock Avenue; 39.81599°N 77.23487°W	John Bigelow, designer Charles Reed, sculptor Boston Marble & Granite Company	1885	MN 213-B	
9th Massachusetts Artillery Battery Monument "Bigelow's Battery"		Wheatfield Road; 39.788493°N 77.237819°W		1885	MN 169-B	
1st Massachusetts Cavalry Monument		South Sedgwick Avenue; 39.796061°N 77.234161°W	Boston Marble and Granite Company	1885	MN 111	
1st Massachusetts Infantry Monument		Emmitsburg Road at Sickles Avenue; 39.808728°N 77.243707°W	Smith Granite Company	1886	MN 199-A	
1st Massachusetts Infantry Marker		Sickles Avenue; 39.809535°N 77.245796°W		1913		
2nd Massachusetts Volunteer Infantry Regiment Monument		Colgrove Avenue; 39.813324°N 77.215871°W	Joshua Happolo	1879	MN 342-B	
7th Massachusetts Infantry Monument		South Sedgwick Avenue; 39.795929°N 77.234121°W	Unknown sculptor	1886	MN 109-B	
9th Massachusetts Infantry Monument		Sykes Avenue, on north side of Big Round Top; 39.788493°N 77.237819°W	Unknown maker	1885	MN 87-B	
10th Massachusetts Infantry Monument		South Sedgewick Avenue; 39.79637°N 77.23419°W	J. K. Newell, designer Melzar Hunt Mosman, sculptor Chester Granite Company	1885	MN 113-B	
11th Massachusetts Infantry Monument		Emmitsburg Road; 39.80807°N 77.244031°W	Smith Granite Company	1885	MN 200-B	
12th Massachusetts Volunteer Infantry Monument		Doubleday Avenue; 39.843697°N 77.242068°W	Smith Granite Company	1885	MN 8-D	
12th Massachusetts Volunteer Infantry Marker		Hancock Avenue; 39.806708°N 77.235107°W				
12th Massachusetts Volunteer Infantry Marker		Ziegler's Grove, Hancock Avenue; 39.817187°N 77.233412°W				
13th Massachusetts Volunteer Infantry Monument		Robinson Avenue; 39.84259°N 77.24129°W	Edward Ludwig Albert Pausch, sculptor Smith Granite Company	1885	MN 18-B	
15th Massachusetts Infantry Monument		Hancock Avenue, south of The Angle; 39.810739°N 77.2361°W	possibly W. P. Dolly, sculptor Boston Marble & Granite Company	1886	MN 203-B	Bas-relief portrait of Colonel George H. Ward.
16th Massachusetts Infantry Monument		Emmitsburg Road; 39.80705°N 77.24534°W	Hallowell Granite Company	1886	MN 196-B	
18th Massachusetts Volunteer Infantry Monument		Sickles Avenue at the Loop; 39.79736°N 77.24591°W	Smith Granite Company	1885	MN 162-B	
19th Massachusetts Infantry Monument		Hancock Avenue; 39.811503°N 77.235416°W	Smith Granite Company	1885	MN 245-B	
20th Massachusetts Infantry Monument		Hancock Avenue; 39.811449°N 77.236159°W	Smith Granite Company	1886	MN 234-B	The boulder atop the monument came from Massachusetts.
22nd Massachusetts Infantry Monument "Henry Wilson's Regiment"		Sickles Avenue; 39.797116°N 77.24641°W	Smith Granite Company	1886	MN 159-B	
28th Massachusetts Volunteer Infantry Monument		Sickles Avenue at the Loop; 39.797405°N 77.245657°W	T. M. Brady, sculptor A. Ford, sculptor	1885	MN 167-B	
32nd Massachusetts Infantry Monument		Sickles Avenue; 39.79698°N 77.245965°W	S.G. Spaulding, sculptor	1885	MN 157-C	
33rd Massachusetts Infantry Monument		Slocum & Wainwright Avenues; 39.819861°N 77.226149°W	John Flaherty, sculptor	1885	MN 303-B	
37th Massachusetts Infantry Monument		Sedgwick Avenue; 39.79812°N 77.234539°W	Miles & Luce	1886	MN 114-B	
1st Company Massachusetts Sharpshooters Monument "Andrews Sharpshooters"		Hancock Avenue; 39.813661°N 77.235443°W	Fred M. Torrey, sculptor	1913	MN 218-A	
2nd Company Massachusetts Sharpshooters Monument "Andrews Sharpshooters"		Sickles Avenue at the Loop; 39.797014°N 77.246365°W	M.H. Murphy, sculptor Boston Marble & Granite Company	1885	MN 158	
MICHIGAN
9th Michigan Battery Monument; Battery I, 1st Michigan Light Artillery "Daniels' Battery"		Hancock Avenue; 39.80785°N 77.235985°W	Smith Granite Company	1889	MN 263-D	
Michigan Cavalry Brigade (1st, 5th, 6th, & 7th Michigan Cavalry) Monument		East Cavalry Field; 39.82618°N 77.16532°W	Ryegate Granite Company	1889	MN 384	
1st Michigan Volunteer Infantry Monument		Sickles Avenue; 39.79737°N 77.24655°W	Smith Granite Company	1889	MN 161-C	
3rd Michigan Infantry Monument		Peach Orchard, Sickles Avenue; 39.80018°N 77.24927°W	Mitchell Granite Company	1889	MN 174-B	
4th Michigan Infantry Monument		Sickles & DeTrobiand Avenues; 39.79619°N 77.243905°W	Lorado Taft, sculptor Mitchell Granite Co. American Bronze Co.	1889	MN 152-B	"A color bearer in action"
5th Michigan Infantry Monument		Sickles Avenue; 39.79719°N 77.244959°W	Ryegate Granite Company	1889	MN 154	
7th Michigan Infantry Monument		Hancock Avenue; 39.8118°N 77.23619°W	Joseph Pasetti, carver Smith Granite Company	1888	MN 233-B	
16th Michigan Volunteer Infantry Monument		Little Round Top; 39.7910°N 77.23745°W	Smith Granite Company	1888	MN 95-B	
24th Michigan Infantry Monument "Iron Brigade"		Stone-Meredith Avenue; 39.83491°N 77.25441°W	Ryegate Granite Company	1889	MN 36	
24th Michigan Infantry Marker "Iron Brigade"		Culp's Hill; 39.83491°N 77.25441°W				
Michigan Sharpshooters Monument (1st United States Sharpshooters, Companies C, I & K and 2nd United States Sharpshooters, Company B)		Little Round Top; 39.791181°N 77.237672°W	Smith Granite Company	1889	MN 98	
MINNESOTA
1st Minnesota Infantry Memorial Urn		National Cemetery; 39.819483°N 77.231933°W	Unknown sculptor	1867	MN 639	
1st Minnesota Infantry Monument	More images	South Hancock Avenue; 39.806631°N 77.235021°W	Jacob Fjelde, sculptor	1897	MN 265	The regiment suffered 82% casualties in this one action.
1st Minnesota Infantry Monument		Hancock Avenue; 39.810483°N 77.236083°W		1897	MN 238	
NEW HAMPSHIRE
Battery A, 1st New Hampshire Light Artillery Monument "Edgell's Battery"		National Cemetery; 39.818048°N 77.232173°W		1912	MN 638-B	
2nd New Hampshire Volunteer Infantry Monument		Peach Orchard, Sickle Avenue; 39.800523°N 77.250334°W	Thomas Nahn, sculptor Nahn Granite Works	1886	MN 176-B	
5th New Hampshire Volunteer Infantry Monument		Ayres Avenue; 39.795024°N 77.24188°W	J. F. Hunton; Thomas Nahn Granite Works	1886	MN 131-B	
12th New Hampshire Volunteer Infantry Monument		Emmitsburg Road; 39.806506°N 77.245989°W	Unknown sculptor	1888	MN 195-B	
New Hampshire Sharpshooters Monument "Berdan's Sharpshooters"		Hancock Avenue; 39.808079°N 77.23618°W	Thomas Nahn, contractor	1893	MN 262-B	"The monument marks the position held by Company E, 1st New Hampshire Sharpshooters on July 3, 1863."
NEW JERSEY
Battery A, 1st New Jersey Artillery Monument "Hexamer's Battery A"		Hancock Avenue; 39.807481°N 77.235464°W	George Brown & Company	1888	MN 261-B	
Battery B, 1st New Jersey Artillery Monument "Clark's Battery B"		Wheatfield Road & Sickles Avenue; 39.801336°N 77.247218°W	Frederick & Field	1888	MN 183-B	
1st New Jersey Cavalry Monument		East Cavalry Field; 39.828713°N 77.169962°W	Frederick & Field	1888	MN 383	
1st New Jersey Brigade Monument; 1st, 2nd, 3rd, 4th & 15th Infantry Regiments		Sedgwick Avenue; 39.800613°N 77.233394°W	New England Monument Company; Bureau Brothers Foundry	1888	MN 271-D	
4th New Jersey Infantry Monument		Granite Schoolhouse Lane & Blacksmith Road; 39.804767°N 77.218°W		1888	MN 640	
5th New Jersey Infantry Monument		Emmitsburg Road; 39.80746°N 77.245155°W	Frederick & Field	1888	MN 197	
6th New Jersey Infantry Monument		Valley of Death, Crawford Avenue; 39.792509°N 77.240922°W	Frederick & Field	1888	MN 125-B	
7th New Jersey Infantry Monument		Sickles Avenue; 39.801487°N 77.246743°W	Frederick & Field	1888	MN 173	
8th New Jersey Infantry Monument		Wheatfield Road; 39.79599°N 77.245585°W	Frederick & Field	1888	MN 148-B	
11th New Jersey Infantry Monument		Emmitsburg Road, south of the Klingle Farm; 39.805905°N 77.246644°W	Smith Granite Company	1888	MN 191-A-B	
12th New Jersey Volunteer Infantry Monument		North Hancock Avenue; 39.81515°N 77.23545°W	M. Reilly, carver Beattie & Brooks; Henry-Bonnard Bronze Company	1886	MN 211-C	The bronze bas-relief panel depicts the unit's assault on the Bliss Barn.
12th New Jersey Volunteer Infantry Marker		Bliss Farm; 39.816567°N 77.241967°W	Frederick & Field	1888	MN?	
13th New Jersey Volunteer Infantry Monument		Carman Avenue; 39.812989°N 77.214704°W	Smith Granite Company	1887	MN 340-C	
NEW YORK
Battery B, 1st New York Light Artillery Monument "Empire Battery"		Hancock Avenue; 39.810629°N 77.235778°W	Frederick & Field	1888	MN 240-D	
Battery C, 1st New York Light Artillery Monument "Barnes' Battery C"		Sedgwick Avenue; 39.796005°N 77.234724°W	Frederick & Field	1893	MN 107-D	
Battery D, 1st New York Artillery Monument "Winslow's Battery D"		Wheatfield Road; 39.797429°N 77.24283°W	Frederick & Field	1888	MN 140-D	
Battery E, 1st New York Light Artillery Monument		Cemetery Hill; 39.820611°N 77.228324°W	W. H. Shelton, sculptor Frederick & Field; Henry-Bonnard Bronze Company, foundry	1891	MN 310-G	At the time of the battle, Battery E was attached to Battery L ("Reynold's Battery").
Battery G, 1st New York Artillery Monument "Ames' Battery G"		Peach Orchard; 39.801301°N 77.250123°W	Frederick & Field	1893	MN 178-E	Detail of inscription:
Battery I, 1st New York Artillery Monument "Wiedrich's Battery I"		East Cemetery Hill; 39.821963°N 77.229075°W	William Lautz, sculptor Lautz & Company	1889	MN 297-B	
Battery K, 1st New York Light Artillery Monument		Hancock Avenue; 39.813613°N 77.235266°W	S. J. O’Kelley, sculptor Frederick & Field	1888	MN 221-D	
Battery L, 1st New York Light Artillery Monument "Reynolds's Battery"		South Reynolds Avenue; 39.831424°N 77.251284°W	Smith & Barry	1889	MN 40-F	
Battery M, 1st New York Artillery Monument "Winegar's Battery M"		Powers' Hill; 39.80636°N 77.22049°W	Frederick & Field	1889	MN 357-B	
1st New York Independent Battery Artillery Monument "Cowan's Battery"		Hancock Avenue; 39.812348°N 77.235625°W	J. G. Hamilton, sculptor Smith Granite Company	1887	MN 231-B	
3rd New York Independent Battery Artillery Monument "Ham's Battery"		Taneytown Road at National Cemetery; 39.816728°N 77.232224°W	Smith Granite Company	1888	MN 280	
4th New York Independent Battery Artillery Monument		Sickles Avenue; 39.792007°N 77.24251°W	Caspar Buberl, sculptor Maurice J. Power	1888	MN 128-F	The bronze artilleryman statue was toppled by vandals in February 2006, and its head stolen. A new head was cast from a duplicate statue in Manchester, New Hampshire.
5th New York Independent Battery Artillery Monument "Taft's Battery"		Soldiers' National Cemetery; 39.821017°N 77.229842°W	Frederick & Field	1889	MN 292-B	
6th New York Independent Battery Artillery Monument "Martin's Battery"		Taneytown Road; 39.815551°N 77.232205°W	Beattie & Brooks; Frederick & Field; Henry-Bonnard Bronze Company	1891	MN 279-B	
10th New York Independent Battery Light Artillery Monument		Wheatfield Road; 39.80064°N 77.247102°W	Frederick & Field	1893	MN 171-B	
11th New York Independent Battery Light Artillery Monument; Havelock's Battery"		Hancock Avenue; 39.813743°N 77.235252°W	Frederick & Field	1893	MN 220-B	
13th New York Independent Battery Light Artillery Monument "Wheeler's Battery"		West Howard Avenue; 39.84255°N 77.23295°W	Smith Granite Company	1893	MN 57-F	
14th New York Independent Battery Artillery (See Irish Brigade)						
15th New York Independent Battery Light Artillery Monument		Wheatfield Road; 39.801058°N 77.248178°W	Robert D. Barr, sculptor, John Broggini & Lonida Comi, carvers Smith Granite Company	1888	MN 182-D	
2nd New York Cavalry Monument		Hummelbaugh Field; 39.808765°N 77.234555°W	Karl Gerhardt sculptor New England Monument Company	1892	MN 254	
4th New York Cavalry Monument		Hummelbaugh Field; 39.808548°N 77.23459°W	Emilio F. Piatti, sculptor Henry-Bonnard Bronze Company; New England Monument Company	1889	MN 255	
5th New York Cavalry Monument		Bushman Woods; 39.78426°N 77.247237°W	Caspar Buberl, sculptor New England Monument Company	1888 relocated 1890	MN 370-B	
6th New York Cavalry Monument		Buford Avenue; 39.844572°N 77.247159°W	James Edward Kelly, sculptor Frederick & Field; Henry-Bonnard Bronze Company	1889	MN 3-B	Bronze bas-relief portrait of Major-General Thomas Devin
8th New York Cavalry Monument		Reynolds & Meredith Avenues; 39.833553°N 77.250557°W	F. Muer, sculptor Smith & Barry	1889	MN 43-B	
9th New York Cavalry Monument		Buford Avenue; 39.845943°N 77.246089°W	Caspar Buberl, sculptor Frederick & Field	1888	MN 4-B	"Discovering the Enemy"
10th New York Cavalry Monument		Brinkerhoff's Ridge, north side of Hanover Road; 39.822502°N 77.190339°W	Caspar Buberl, sculptor New England Granite Company	1888	MN 70	
Oneida, New York Independent Cavalry Monument		Cemetery Ridge; 39.814567°N 77.232317°W	Unknown sculptor	1904	MN 276	Union cmpy
10th New York Infantry Monument		Hancock Avenue; 39.81428°N 77.23442°W	Frederick & Field	1889	MN 241-B	
12th and 44th New York Infantry Monument "Ellsworth's Avengers"		Little Round Top; 39.791224°N 77.237015°W	Daniel Butterfield, a former commander of the regiment,. William H. Jackson Company	1893	MN 93	To commemorate the regiment designed to be "Ellsworth's Avengers"
39th New York Infantry Monument		Hancock Avenue; 39.814179°N 77.23525°W	Frederick & Field	1888	MN 216-C	
40th New York Infantry Monument		Sickles Avenue; 39.79238°N 77.240437°W	Robert D. Barr, sculptor, John Gugnola, carver Smith Granite Company	1888	MN 124-B	
41st New York Infantry Monument		Wainwright Avenue; 39.821351°N 77.227206°W	Caspar Buberl, sculptor	1893	MN 302-B	
42nd New York Infantry Monument "Tammany Regiment"		Hancock Avenue; 39.812016°N 77.235411°W	John J. Boyle, sculptor Bureau Brothers Foundry	1891	MN 244-B	The sculpture depicts Tamanend (Tammany), a Lenni-Lenape chief.
43rd New York Infantry Monument		Neill Avenue; 39.80798°N 77.210061°W	Frederick & Field	1889	MN 363-B	
44th New York Infantry Monument (See 12th and 44th New York Infantry Monument)						
45th New York Infantry Monument		West Howard Avenue; 39.840527°N 77.235692°W	Caspar Buberl, sculptor New England Monument Company	1888	MN 53-A	
49th New York Infantry Monument		Neill Avenue; 39.807784°N 77.211268°W	Frederick & Field	1893	MN 362-B	
52nd New York Infantry Monument		Sickles Avenue; 39.797411°N 77.245662°W	Caspar Buberl, sculptor Henry-Bonnard Bronze Company	1893	MN 163-B	
54th New York Infantry Monument		Wainwright Avenue; 39.822175°N 77.227817°W	Caspar Buberl, sculptor	1990	MN 298-C	
57th New York Infantry Monument		Wheatfield Road; 39.7969°N 77.24449°W	Frederick & Field	1889	MN 153-B	
58th New York Infantry Monument		East Howard Avenue; 39.84373°N 77.228067°W	New England Granite Company	1888	MN 64	
59th New York Infantry Monument		Cemetery Ridge; 39.812059°N 77.236242°W	Frederick & Field	1889	MN 232-B	59th New York Volunteer Infantry Regiment
60th New York Infantry Monument		Culp's Hill; 39.819655°N 77.220079°W	Frederick & Field	1888 relocated 1902	MN 316-C	
61st Regiment New York Infantry Monument		Wheatfield Road; 39.796988°N 77.241953°W	Unknown maker	1889	MN 828-B	
62nd New York Infantry Monument		Althoff Lane; 39.797196°N 77.237398°W	Byron M. Pickett, sculptor Maurice J. Power, contractor	1888	MN 120-B	
63rd New York Infantry Regiment (See Irish Brigade)						
64th New York Infantry Monument		Brooke Avenue; 39.79499°N 77.24698°W	W. B. Archibald, sculptor	1890	MN 142	
65th New York Volunteer Infantry Monument		Slocum Avenue; 39.818059°N 77.21961°W	Smith Granite Company	1888	MN 352-A	
66th New York Infantry Monument		Sickles Avenue at the Loop; 39.79727°N 77.24505°W	Maurice J. Power	1889	MN 155	
67th New York Infantry Monument; 1st Brigade, Long Island Volunteers		Slocum Avenue; 39.817711°N 77.219725°W	S. J. O'Kelley, sculptor Frederick & Field	1888	MN 350	
68th New York Infantry Monument		Wainwright Avenue; 39.821928°N 77.22763°W	Frederick & Field	1888	MN 299-B	
69th New York Infantry Regiment (See Irish Brigade)						
70th New York Infantry Regiment (See Excelsior Brigade)						
71st New York Infantry Regiment (See Excelsior Brigade)						
72nd New York Infantry Regiment (See Excelsior Brigade)						
73rd New York Infantry Regiment (See Excelsior Brigade)						
2nd Fire Zouaves, 73rd New York Infantry Monument; 4th Excelsior Regiment		Excelsior Field, Sickles Avenue; 39.802113°N 77.248159°W	Giuseppe Moretti	1897	MN 185	New York firemen who enrolled in this New York regiment, who fought on this spot, July 2.
74th New York Infantry Regiment (See Excelsior Brigade)						
76th New York Infantry Monument		North Reynolds Avenue; 39.839928°N 77.246713°W	Frederick & Field	1888	MN 19-C	
77th New York Infantry Monument		Powers' Hill; 39.805204°N 77.219553°W	Thomas & Miller	1889	MN 360-B	
78th and 102nd New York Infantry Regiments Monument "Cameron's Highlanders"		Slocum Avenue; 39.818516°N 77.219489°W	Robert D. Barr sculptor Smith Granite Company	1888	MN 320-B	
80th New York Infantry Monument; 20th New York Militia, "Ulster Guard"		South Reynolds Avenue; 39.831432°N 77.251279°W	Frederick & Field	1888	MN 46-B	
82nd New York Infantry Monument (foreground)		Hancock Avenue; 39.81032°N 77.236081°W	Maurice J. Power	1890	MN 239	
83rd New York Infantry Monument		Doubleday Avenue; 39.842937°N 77.242278°W	J. G. Hamilton, sculptor Smith Granite Company	1888	MN 11-B	
84th New York Infantry Marker		Stone-Meredith Avenue; 39.835815°N 77.252904°W		1893	MN?	
84th New York Infantry Marker		Culp's Hill; 39.817076°N 77.219574°W		1890	MN?	A bronze tablet set into a boulder.
84th New York Infantry Monument; 14th New York State Militia; 14th Brooklyn Regiment "Red Legged Devils"		North Reynolds Avenue; 39.837613°N 77.248494°W	Robert D. Barr, sculptor Smith Granite Company	1887	MN 27-D	
86th New York Infantry Monument		Sickles Avenue, above Devil's Den; 39.793574°N 77.242615°W	Frederick and Field	1888	MN 130-B	
93rd New York Infantry Monument		Leister Farm; 39.81461°N 77.23201°W	Frederick & Field	1890	MN 278-B	
94th New York Infantry Monument		Doubleday Avenue; 39.841285°N 77.242966°W	Smith Granite Company	1888	MN 16-B	
95th New York Infantry Monument		North Reynolds Avenue, by the railroad cut 39.837428°N 77.248073°W	Frederick & Field	1893	MN 25-F	
97th New York Infantry Monument		Doubleday Avenue; 39.842506°N 77.242457°W	Frederick & Field	1889	MN 12-B	
102nd New York Infantry Monument (See 78th New York Infantry Regiment)						
104th New York Infantry Monument		Robinson Avenue; 39.843207°N 77.241572°W	Frederick & Field	1888	MN 17-B	
107th New York Infantry Monument		South Slocum Avenue; 39.814736°N 77.216708°W	A. W. Ayres & Son	1888	MN 336-B	
108th New York Infantry Monument		Hancock Avenue; 39.816262°N 77.234598°W	Robert D. Barr, sculptor Smith Granite Company	1888	MN 209-B	
111th New York Infantry Monument		Hancock Avenue; 39.815416°N 77.235392°W	Caspar Buberl, sc. Frederick & Field; Henry-Bonnard Bronze Company	1891	MN 210-B	Recognizes the role of the 111th as skirmishers throughout the battle.
119th New York Infantry Monument		East Howard Avenue; 39.843132°N 77.230757°W	Smith Granite Company	1888	MN 60-B	
120th New York Infantry Monument		Sickles Avenue; 39.804666°N 77.246115°W	Frederick & Field	1889	MN 192-B	
121st New York Infantry Monument		Sykes Avenue, Little Round Top; 39.793652°N 77.235478°W	S. J. O'Kelley, sculptor Frederick & Field	1889	MN 103-B	
122nd New York Infantry Monument (on right)		Slocum Avenue, Culp's Hill; 39.817933°N 77.219274°W	Francis & Company	1888	MN 322-A	
123rd New York Volunteer Infantry Monument		Slocum Avenue, Culp's Hill; 39.816256°N 77.218041°W	J. G. Hamilton, sculptor Smith Granite Company	1888	MN 329-C	
124th New York Infantry Monument, Colonel Augustus van Horne Ellis Statue		Houck's Ridge, Sickles Avenue; 39.792376°N 77.242274°W	Maurice J. Power; P. B. Laird	1884	MN 129-C	Colonel Ellis was killed in the battle.
124th New York Infantry Marker		Hummelbaugh Field, Pleasonton Avenue; 39.808672°N 77.235274°W	E.F. Carr & Company	1889	MN 256	A 2-stepped granite monument with a bronze roundel of the Seal of New York. Marks the regiment's position during Pickett's Charge, July 3, 1863.
125th New York Infantry Monument		Cemetery Ridge, Hancock Avenue; 39.81474°N 77.23524°W	Frederick & Field	1888	MN 214-B	
"Willard's Brigade" Marker; 125th New York Infantry		Sickles Avenue; 39.80668°N 77.244846°W		1893	MN 641	
126th New York Infantry Monument		Ziegler's Grove, Hancock Avenue; 39.8167°N 77.23444°W	Caspar Buberl, sculptor	1888	MN 208-B	The monument features a bronze relief bust of General Eliakim Sherrill.
134th New York Infantry Monument		Cemetery Hill; 39.822103°N 77.229421°W	Frederick & Field	1888	MN 826-A	
136th New York Infantry Monument		West of Taneytown Road; 39.81994°N 77.232919°W	Frederick & Field	1888	MN 827-B	
137th New York Infantry Monument		Slocum Avenue, Culp's Hill; 39.817585°N 77.21947°W	Frederick & Field	1888	MN 324-B	
140th New York Infantry Monument; Colonel Patrick H. O'Rorke bas-relief		Little Round Top; 39.791284°N 77.237089°W	J. G. Hamilton, sculptor Smith Granite Company	1889	MN 94-B	The monument features a bronze relief portrait of Colonel Patrick H. O'Rorke.
145th New York Infantry Monument		Slocum Avenue, Culp's Hill; 39.815659°N 77.217528°W	New England Monument Company	1890	MN 332	
146th New York Infantry Monument		Little Round Top; 39.792704°N 77.236808°W	Frederick & Field	1880	MN 100-B	
147th New York Infantry Monument		North Reynolds Avenue; 39.838085°N 77.2478°W	Frederick & Field	1888	MN 22-C	
149th New York Volunteer Infantry Regiment Monument		Slocum Avenue, Culp's Hill; 39.817931°N 77.219274°W	Ralph Cook, sculptor Smith Granite Company	1892	MN 321-A	The bronze bas-relief panel depicts Color Sergeant William C. Lilly repairing the flagstaff in the midst of a firefight. See Soldiers and Sailors Monument (Syracuse, New York).
150th New York Infantry Monument		Culp's Hill; 39.819114°N 77.21958°W	George Edwin Bissell, sculptor Van Wyck & Collins Company	1889	MN 319-C	
154th New York Infantry Monument		Coster Avenue; 39.835133°N 77.227571°W	Frederick & Field	1890	MN 50-B	
157th New York Infantry Marker		Biglerville Road; 39.845535°N 77.231352°W				
157th New York Infantry Monument		Howard Avenue & Carlisle Road; 39.842954°N 77.231477°W	New England Monument Company	1886	MN 59-A	
157th New York Infantry Monument		Howard Avenue & Carlisle Road; 39.840154°N 77.236502°W	New England Monument Company	1886	MN 52	
Excelsior Brigade Monument ("Sickle's Brigade"); 70th New York Infantry; 71st New York Infantry; 72nd New York Infantry; 73rd New York Infantry; 74th New York Infantry		Sickles Avenue, near Peach Orchard; 39.80179°N 77.247491°W	Theodore Bauer, sculptor Maurice J. Power, sc. New England Monument Company	1893	MN 184-E	
Irish Brigade Monument (63rd, 69th & 83rd New York Infantry Regiments and 14th New York Independent Battery Artillery)		Sickles Avenue, Rose Woods; 39.797052°N 77.245093°W	William Rudolph O'Donovan, sculptor John Hemingway Duncan, designer Maurice J. Power, contractor	1888	MN 156-A	A statue of an Irish wolfhound, the regiment's mascot, guards the monument. A bronze bas-relief panel on the base honors the 14th New York Independent Battery Artillery.
15th & 50th New York Engineers Monument		Pleasonton Avenue; 39.808079°N 77.233273°W	Beattie & Brooks; Frederick & Field	1890	MN 258	
New York Sharpshooters Monument (1st United States Sharpshooters, Companies A, B, D & H)		Berdan Avenue; 39.807994°N 77.257555°W	Frederick & Field	1889	MN 75	
20th New York State Militia (80th New York Infantry Regiment) Monument		Hancock Avenue	Unknown sculptor	1982	MN 798	
OHIO
Battery H, 1st Ohio Artillery Monument "Huntington's Battery H"		National Cemetery; 39.81825°N 77.2315°W	Smith Granite Company	1887	MN 283-D	
Battery I, 1st Ohio Artillery Monument		West Howard Avenue; 39.841919°N 77.233868°W	Thomas Fox	1887	MN 56-F	
Battery K, 1st Ohio Artillery Monument		Carlisle & Lincoln Streets; 39.83686°N 77.23130°W	Frederick & Field	1887	MN 51-B	
Battery L, 1st Ohio Artillery Monument		Sykes Avenue; 39.793588°N 77.236384°W	Ryegate Granite Company	1887	MN 102-D	
1st Ohio Cavalry Monument		Taneytown Road, near Hummelbaugh Farm; 39.808268°N 77.23062°W	M. V. Mitchell & Sons	1887	MN 273	
6th Ohio Cavalry Monument		Taneytown Road & Pleasonton Avenue; 39.807846°N 77.230599°W	Frederick & Fox	1887	MN 272	
4th Ohio Infantry Monument		East Cemetery Hill; 39.82097°N 77.228745°W	Peter B. Laird, designer Monumental Bronze Company	1887	MN 309-B	The monument's bronze infantryman statue is in storage.
Companies G & I, 4th Ohio Infantry Monument		Emmitsburg Road; 39.81673°N 77.2363°W		1887	MN 205-B	
5th Ohio Infantry Monument		Geary Avenue; 39.816248°N 77.22031°W	J. McElwaine	1887	MN 345-D	
7th Ohio Volunteer Infantry Monument		Slocum Avenue; 39.817313°N 77.21962°W	Smith Granite Company	1887	MN 325-B	
8th Ohio Infantry Monument "Ohio's Tribute"		Steinwehr Avenue; 39.81605°N 77.23705°W	R.R. King, sculptor New England Granite Works	1887	MN 204-B	A granite infantryman statue originally crowned the monument. This was replaced by the bronze drum and knapsack.
25th & 75th Ohio Infantry Monument		Wainwright Avenue; 39.845317°N 77.226656°W	Thomas Fox, sculptor	1887	MN 294-D	
25th and 75th Ohio Infantry Monument		East Howard Avenue; 39.845326°N 77.226659°W	Smith Granite Company	1887	MN 66	
29th Ohio Infantry Monument		Slocum Avenue; 39.817861°N 77.219315°W	Patrick McGinn, sculptor Ryegate Granite Company	1887	MN 323-B	
55th Ohio Infantry Monument		Taneytown Road; 39.8214668°N 77.232914°W	R.R. King, sculptor Karkadoulias Bronze Art	1887	MN 818-A	The monument is made of brownstone, and has eroded.
61st Ohio Infantry Monument		South Howard Avenue; 39.841563°N 77.234024°W	M. V. Mitchell & Son	1887	MN 55-B	
66th Ohio Infantry Monument		Culp's Hill, Slocum Avenue; 39.820096°N 77.219591°W	J. McElwaine	1887	MN 315-A	
73rd Ohio Infantry Monument		National Cemetery Annex; 39.82042°N 77.232745°W	New England Granite Works	1887	MN 287-B	
82nd Ohio Infantry Monument		East Howard Avenue; 39.843268°N 77.230014°W	Thomas Fox	1887	MN 61-B	
107th Ohio Volunteer Infantry Monument		East Howard Avenue; 39.84514°N 77.22714°W	Smith Granite Company	1887	MN 65-B	
Candy's Brigade Marker; 5th, 7th, 29th, 66th Ohio Infantry and 28th & 147th Pennsylvania Infantry		Sedgwick Avenue; 39.818668°N 77.21967°W		1902	MN 390	
PENNSYLVANIA
Battery B, 1st Pennsylvania Artillery Monument "Cooper's Battery B"		East Cemetery Hill; 39.82138°N 77.228668°W	Sholl & Robinson	1889	MN 307-E	
Battery C, 1st Pennsylvania Light Artillery Monument; Thompson's Battery C"		Wheatfield Road at the Peach Orchard; 39.801431°N 77.249693°W	Ryegate Granite Company	1893	MN 179-B	
Combined Battery C & F, 1st Pennsylvania Light Artillery Marker		Hancock Avenue; 39.801341°N 77.249433°W	Unknown sculptor	1885	MN 264-B	
Battery E, 1st Pennsylvania Artillery Monument "Knap's Battery E"		Culp's Hill; 39.820018°N 77.220036°W	Smith Granite Company	1885–86	MN 314-A	
Battery E, 1st Pennsylvania Artillery Monument "Knap's Battery E"		Powers' Hill, Granite Schoolhouse Lane; 39.80606°N 77.22015°W	Bureau Brothers Foundry; Smith Granite Company	1897	MN 358	
Battery F, 1st Pennsylvania Light Artillery Monument "Hampton's Battery F"		Wheatfield Road at the Peach Orchard; 39.801341°N 77.249433°W	C. F. Hamilton (Murray Hamilton?), sculptor A. E. Windsor & Company	1890	MN 180-B	
Battery F & G, 1st Pennsylvania Artillery Monument "Rickett's Battery F & G"		East Cemetery Hill; 39.821617°N 77.228724°W	Bas-relief carved by John B. DeRocchi Smith Granite Company	1894	MN 306-C	
Battery H, 3rd Pennsylvania Heavy Artillery Monument		Hanover Road; 39.818835°N 77.17299°W	Beattie & Brooks, sc. Bureau Brothers Foundry	1891	MN 381-B	
1st Pennsylvania Cavalry Monument with two flank markers		east of Hancock Avenue; 39.79793°N 77.234628°W	Henry Jackson Ellicott, sculptor	1890	MN 225-B	The position of the 1st PA Cavalry on July 3, 1863, at the time of Longstreet's assault.
2nd Pennsylvania Cavalry Monument		Leister Farm; 39.814338°N 77.233665°W	Henry Jackson Ellicott, sculptor Bureau Brothers Foundry	1889	MN 242-A	
3rd Pennsylvania Cavalry Monument		East Cavalry Battlefield; 39.8273°N 77.16255°W	Unknown sculptor	1889–90	MN 386-B	
4th Pennsylvania Cavalry Monument		South Hancock Avenue; 39.804776°N 77.234526°W	Dalbeattie Granite Works	1889	MN 266-B	
6th Pennsylvania Cavalry Regiment Monument "Rush's Lancers"		South Cavalry Field, Emmitsburg Road; 39.779537°N 77.26068°W	Frank Furness, designer Gessler & Sons	1888	MN 369-B	Furness, the monument's designer, had been a captain in the regiment.
Companies E & I, 6th Pennsylvania Cavalry Monument		Leister Farm, Taneytown Road; 39.777113°N 77.264928°W	Unknown sculptor	1891	MN 277	A six-sided granite obelisk, with bronze plaques and crossed swords.
8th Pennsylvania Cavalry Monument		Pleasonton Avenue; 39.80836°N 77.23463°W	John M. Gessler & Sons	1890	MN 257	
11th Pennsylvania Infantry Monument		Doubleday Avenue; 39.842165°N 77.242589°W	Edward Adolph Kretschman (1849-1923), sculptor Bureau Brothers Foundry	1890	MN 13-B	A statue of Sallie Ann Jarrett, known as "Sallie," the regiment's mascot, guards the monument.
16th Pennsylvania Cavalry Monument		Highland Avenue; 39.817554°N 77.197766°W	Unknown sculptor	1884	MN 365	
17th Pennsylvania Cavalry Monument		Buford Avenue; 39.84733°N 77.24547°W	Bas-relief carved by Angelo Zerbarini Smith Granite Company	1889	MN 5-B	Veteran George Ferree, wearing his uniform and equipment served as the model for this memorial.
18th Pennsylvania Cavalry Monument		Bushman Hill, South Confederate Avenue; 39.78475°N 77.2496°W	Smith Granite Company	1889	MN 368-B	
21st Pennsylvania Cavalry Monument		Baltimore Pike; 39.809129°N 77.218617°W	Francis Edwin Elwell, sculptor John Ferguson Company	1893	MN 355	Marks the location where Private George Washington Sandoe was killed, June 26, 1863 – the first Union soldier to die in the battle.
21st Pennsylvania Cavalry Regimental Association Monument		Baltimore Pike; 39.808888°N 77.218376°W	Unknown sculptor	1894	MN 356	
23rd Pennsylvania Volunteer Infantry Monument "Birney's Zouaves"		Slocum Avenue; 39.817581°N 77.219741°W	Unknown sculptor	1886 relocated 1888	MN 349-B	Originally topped by a pyramid of cannonballs, the statue was added in 1888 when the monument was relocated.
26th Pennsylvania Infantry Monument		Emmitsburg Road; 39.80894°N 77.242991°W	John M. Gessler	early 1890s	MN 202-B	
27th Pennsylvania Infantry Monument		East Cemetery Hill; 39.822066°N 77.2297°W	Unknown sculptor	1889	MN 293-B	Marks the position of the regiment, July 1 to 3, 1863.
27th Pennsylvania Infantry Monument		Coster Avenue; 39.835111°N 77.22801°W	A. Donnelly, sculptor J. C. Moore Company	1884	MN 49	
28th Pennsylvania Infantry Monument		Slocum Avenue; 39.819178°N 77.220142°W	Smith Granite Company	1885 altered 1889 relocated 1895	MN 353-B	The large 5-pointed star was added to the monument in 1889.
28th Pennsylvania Infantry Monument		East Confederate Avenue; 39.81674°N 77.214712°W	Unknown sculptor	1904	MN 337	
29th Pennsylvania Infantry Monument		Slocum Avenue; 39.816472°N 77.218408°W	John M. Gessler & Sons	1889	MN 346-B	
29th Pennsylvania Infantry Marker		Slocum Avenue; 39.816901°N 77.220017°W	John M. Gessler & Sons	1885	MN 347-B	
30th Pennsylvania Infantry (See 1st Pennsylvania Reserves Monument)						
31st Pennsylvania Infantry (See 2nd Pennsylvania Reserves Monument)						
34th Pennsylvania Infantry (See 5th Pennsylvania Reserves Monument)						
35th Pennsylvania Infantry (See 6th Pennsylvania Reserves Monument)						
38th Pennsylvania Infantry (See 9th Pennsylvania Reserves Monument)						
39th Pennsylvania Infantry (See 10th Pennsylvania Reserves Monument)						
40th Pennsylvania Infantry (See 11th Pennsylvania Reserves Monument)						
41st Pennsylvania Infantry (See 12th Pennsylvania Reserves Monument)						
42nd Pennsylvania Infantry (See 13th Pennsylvania Reserves Monument)						
46th Pennsylvania Volunteer Infantry Monument		Culp's Hill; 39.81527°N 77.217155°W	Ryegate Granite Company	1889	MN 333-B	
49th Pennsylvania Infantry Monument		Howe Avenue; 39.783256°N 77.22767°W	Gorham Manufacturing Company, foundry Ryegate Granite Company	1889	MN 379-B	
53rd Pennsylvania Infantry Monument		Brooke Avenue; 39.7951°N 77.2470°W	A. Wagner, sculptor Henry-Bonnard Bronze Company; Oursler & Sons	1889	MN 145-B	
56th Pennsylvania Infantry Monument		North Reynolds Avenue; 39.838952°N 77.247287°W	Bureau Brothers Foundry	1889	MN 21-B	
57th Pennsylvania Infantry Monument		Emmitsburg Road; 39.803688°N 77.248642°W	McMenamin	1888	MN 190-B	
61st Pennsylvania Infantry Monument		Neill Avenue; 39.808015°N 77.209404°W	Unknown sculptor	1888	MN 364-B	
62nd Pennsylvania Infantry Monument		Wheatfield, DeTrobriand Avenue; 39.79589°N 77.244082°W	H. Oursler & Sons	1889	MN 151-B	
63rd Pennsylvania Infantry Monument		Emmitsburg & Wheatfield Roads; 39.801802°N 77.250123°W	Bureau Brothers Foundry; Gunden, Young & Drumm	1889	MN 187	
68th Pennsylvania Infantry Monument		Peach Orchard, Wheatfield Road; 39.80141°N 77.24915°W	W. C. Gallagher	1888	MN 186-A	
68th Pennsylvania Infantry Monument "Scott's Legion"		Emmitsburg Road; 39.800599°N 77.250442°W	Unknown sculptor	1886	MN 177	
69th Pennsylvania Infantry Monument; 2nd California Regiment "Philadelphia Brigade"		Hancock Avenue; 39.813001°N 77.236272°W	Joseph E. Burk, sculptor	1887	MN 228-J	
71st Pennsylvania Infantry Regiment Monument; 1st California Regiment "Philadelphia Brigade"		The Angle; 39.813001°N 77.236272°W	Smith Granite Company	1887	MN 223-B	To show California's sympathy with the Union cause, longtime San Francisco resident and U.S. Senator from Oregon Edward D. Baker of California recruited soldiers in the Philadelphia area to fight in four regiments representing California. He commanded the 1st California and the entire brigade until his death in October 1861, after which the four were renamed as the 69th, 71st, 72nd and 106th Pennsylvania Regiments. This brigade earned the sobriquet "Philadelphia Brigade" after the transfer, although many soldiers continued to use the "California Regiment" term as well.
72nd Pennsylvania Infantry Monument; 3rd California Regiment "Philadelphia Brigade"		The Angle; 39.81299°N 77.236267°W	[Frank?] Stephens, sculptor J. Reed, designer Bureau Brothers Foundry	1891	MN 226	
72nd Pennsylvania Volunteer Infantry Monument; 3rd California Regiment "Philadelphia Brigade"		Hancock Avenue; 39.813032°N 77.2357°W	John Flaherty	1883	MN 227	
73rd Pennsylvania Infantry Monument		East Cemetery Hill; 39.821917°N 77.229215°W	Alexander Milne Calder, sculptor Giles, Michael & Company	1889	MN 295-B	Bas-relief by Alexander Milne Calder.
74th Pennsylvania Infantry Monument		Howard Avenue; 39.840974°N 77.23437°W	Unknown sculptor	1888	MN 54-C	
75th Pennsylvania Infantry Monument		East Howard Avenue; 39.84334°N 77.229609°W	Bureau Brothers Foundry	1888	MN 62-B	
75th Pennsylvania Infantry Monument		National Cemetery; 39.821427°N 77.230473°W	Unknown sculptor	1886	MN 290	A 4-stepped granite monument: "In Memoriam of Our Comrades."
81st Pennsylvania Infantry Monument		Wheatfield Road; 39.7966°N 77.24196°W	Eisenbrown & Sons, Reading, PA	1888	MN 138-B	
82nd Pennsylvania Infantry Monument		Slocum Avenue; 39.8179°N 77.219653°W	Unknown sculptor	1888	MN 351-B	
83rd Pennsylvania Infantry Monument; General Strong Vincent Statue		Little Round Top; 39.789957°N 77.236969°W	S. J. O'Kelley, sculptor P. F. Eisenbrown & Sons Company, Reading, PA	1889	MN 91-B	
84th Pennsylvania Infantry Monument		Pleasonton Avenue; 39.808219°N 77.235325°W	Eisenbrown & Sons, Reading, PA	1889	MN 259-B	
88th Pennsylvania Infantry Monument		Doubleday Avenue; 39.84341°N 77.24208°W	John Lackner, sculptor	1889	MN 9-E	
88th Pennsylvania Infantry Marker		Oak Ridge; 39.843592°N 77.242902°W				
88th Pennsylvania Infantry Marker		Cemetery Ridge; 39.806506°N 77.235006°W				
88th Pennsylvania Infantry Marker		Ziegler's Grove; 39.81698°N 77.23414°W				
90th Pennsylvania Infantry Monument ("Granite Tree Monument")		Doubleday Avenue, at Mummasburg Road; 39.84436°N 77.241971°W	John M. Gessler Granite Company	1888	MN 7-B	A sculpted granite stump marks the regiment's right flank.
90th Pennsylvania Volunteer Infantry Monument ("Eagle Monument")		Ziegler's Grove; 39.816676°N 77.234434°W	J. M. Gessler	1888	MN 206-C	
90th Pennsylvania Infantry Marker		Hancock Avenue; 39.806202°N 77.234914°W	Unknown sculptor	1888		
91st Pennsylvania Veteran Volunteers Infantry Monument (See Weed and Hazlett Monument)		Little Round Top; 39.792121°N 77.236583°W	Schell, contractor	1883 relocated 1889	MN 96	When the 91st Pennsylvania Infantry decided to build a much larger monument (see next), the original monument was relocated to a nearby boulder and repurposed to honor Brigadier-General Stephen H. Weed and Lieutenant Charles E. Hazlett.
91st Pennsylvania Infantry Monument		Little Round Top; 39.792147°N 77.236728°W	Ryegate Granite Company	1889	MN 97-B	
93rd Pennsylvania Infantry Monument		Weikert Farm Lane; 39.797007°N 77.237573°W	Eisenbrown & Sons	1888	MN 119-B	
93rd Pennsylvania Infantry Monument		west of Sedgwick Avenue; 39.796059°N 77.234611°W	Unknown sculptor	1884	MN 110	
95th Pennsylvania Infantry Monument		Wheatfield Road; 39.795426°N 77.236518°W	Unknown sculptor	1888	MN 115-A	
96th Pennsylvania Infantry Monument		Wheatfield Road; 39.796094°N 77.237696°W	August Zeller, sculptor Richard Collins Granite Works	1888	MN 116-B	
98th Pennsylvania Infantry Monument		North slope of Little Round Top; 39.793652°N 77.235483°W	Unknown maker	1884	MN 104-B	
98th Pennsylvania Infantry Monument		Althoff Farm; 39.797611°N 77.236655°W	Unknown sculptor	1889	MN 122	
99th Pennsylvania Infantry Monument		Hancock Avenue; 39.813502°N 77.235172°W	William Clark Company	1886 relocated 1889	MN 222	
99th Pennsylvania Infantry Monument		Houk's Ridge above Devil's Den; 39.792372°N 77.242264°W	Cunningham Company	1889	MN 137-B	
102nd Pennsylvania Infantry Monument		Plum Run Valley; 39.79745°N 77.2374°W	H. Oursler & Sons	1889	MN 121-B	
105th Pennsylvania Infantry Monument "Wildcat Regiment"		Emmitsburg Road; 39.80428°N 77.247905°W	H. Oursler & Sons	1889	MN 191-A	
106th Pennsylvania Infantry Monument "Philadelphia Brigade"		Hancock Avenue at The Angle; 39.81259°N 77.23563°W	John Walz sculptor John M. Gessler Granite Company	1889	MN 229-C	Bronze bas-relief by John Walz.
106th Pennsylvania Infantry Monument "Philadelphia Brigade"		Codori Farm, Emmitsburg Road; 39.811699°N 77.239909°W		1885 relocated 1889	MN 637	
106th Pennsylvania Infantry Marker "Philadelphia Brigade"		East Cemetery Hill; 39.82232°N 77.22944°W				A 2-stepped granite monument marking the regiment's position on July 3, 1863.
107th Pennsylvania Infantry Monument		Doubleday Avenue; 39.8419°N 77.24271°W	Ryegate Granite Company	1889	MN 14-C	
109th Pennsylvania Infantry Monument		Slocum Avenue; 39.81699°N 77.21931°W	Eisenbrown & Sons	1889	MN 326-B	
110th Pennsylvania Infantry Monument		DeTrobriand Avenue; 39.79656°N 77.24609°W	John A. Fox, architect	1889	MN 147-B	
111th Pennsylvania Infantry Monument		Slocum Avenue; 39.816771°N 77.21876°W	Ryegate Granite Company	1889	MN 327-B	
114th Pennsylvania Infantry Monument		Sherfy Farm, Emmitsburg Road; 39.80353°N 77.24877°W	Edward Adolph Kretschman (1849-1923), sculptor Bureau Brothers Foundry	1886	MN 189-A	
114th Pennsylvania Infantry Marker		Hancock Avenue; 39.813499°N 77.23464°W	Unknown sculptor	1902	MN 275	The monument marks the regiment's position on July 3, 1863.
115th Pennsylvania Infantry Monument		Wheatfield, west of DeTrobriand Avenue; 39.7959°N 77.24432°W	Unknown sculptor	1889	MN 149-B	
116th Pennsylvania Infantry Monument		Sickles Avenue; 39.79753°N 77.24588°W	J. Henderson Kelley	1889	MN 166-B	The soldiers who died in the battle
118th Pennsylvania Infantry Monument		Sickles Avenue; 39.79765°N 77.24682°W	Ryegate Granite Company	1889	MN 160-F	
118th Pennsylvania Infantry Monument		Northwest slope of Big Round Top; 39.7874°N 77.2388°W	Unknown maker	1884	MN 86	
119th Pennsylvania Infantry Monument		Big Round Top; 39.7867°N 77.2394°W	Unknown sculptor	1885	MN 374	
119th Pennsylvania Volunteer Infantry Monument		Howe Avenue; 39.7838°N 77.2293°W	Ferguson Company	1888	MN 377-B	
121st Pennsylvania Infantry Monument		South Reynolds Avenue; 39.830439°N 77.251625°W	Bureau Brothers Foundry; Heins & Bye Company	1888	MN 47-B	
121st Pennsylvania Infantry Monument		Hancock Avenue; 39.8109°N 77.23544°W	Unknown sculptor	1886	MN 246	
139th PA Infantry Monument		Sickles Avenue; 39.80112°N 77.24702°W	Smith Granite Company	1886	MN 172	
139th Pennsylvania Infantry Monument		Althoff Avenue; 39.79661°N 77.23789°W	Smith Granite Company	1889	MN 118-B	
140th Pennsylvania Volunteer Infantry Monument		Between the Wheatfield and Peach Orchard; 39.797561°N 77.245595°W	John Flaherty, sculptor	1885	MN 165	
140th Pennsylvania Infantry Monument		Sickles Avenue; 39.79765°N 77.246225°W	Eisenbrown & Sons	1889	MN 164-B	
141st Pennsylvania Infantry Monument		Wheatfield Road; 39.80109°N 77.24881°W	Unknown sculptor	1889	MN 181-B	
142nd Pennsylvania Volunteer Infantry Monument		South Reynolds Avenue; 39.83274°N 77.25083°W	Smith Granite Company	1889	MN 45-B	
143rd Pennsylvania Volunteer Infantry Monument		Chambersburg Pike & Reynolds Avenue; 39.836596°N 77.249245°W	Smith Granite Company	1889	MN 38-E	
143rd Pennsylvania Volunteer Infantry Monument		Hancock Avenue; 39.809861°N 77.236135°W		1895		A 3-stepped granite monument marking the regiment's position on July 2 & 3, 1863, and listing its casualties.
145th Pennsylvania Infantry Monument		Brooke Avenue; 39.795622°N 77.247105°W	Stephens, sculptor Ryegate Granite Company	1889	MN 146-B	
147th Pennsylvania Volunteer Infantry Monument		Sykes Avenue, Little Round Top; 39.794561°N 77.234346°W	Smith Granite Company	1885	MN 105-B	
147th Pennsylvania Volunteer Infantry Monument; Pardee Field Monument		Pardee Field; 39.815725°N 77.219618°W	Unknown sculptor	1905–06	MN 344	
147th Pennsylvania Veterans Volunteer Infantry Monument		Geary Avenue; 39.81583°N 77.220388°W	Smith Granite Company?	1882	MN 343-C	
148th Pennsylvania Infantry Monument		Ayres Avenue, the Wheatfield; 39.795958°N 77.241974°W	Eisenbrown & Sons	1889	MN 139-C	
148th Pennsylvania Infantry Marker		Hancock Avenue; 39.805447°N 77.234837°W		1901		
149th Pennsylvania Infantry Monument		Chambersburg Pike, McPherson Ridge; 39.83756°N 77.25141°W	H. Oursler & Sons	1889	MN 31-C	
Company D, 149th Pennsylvania Infantry Monument		West Confederate Avenue; 39.829512°N 77.244018°W		1886	MN?	
149th Pennsylvania Infantry Monument		Hancock Avenue; 39.810125°N 77.23577°W	Smith Granite Company	1886	MN 248	
150th Pennsylvania Infantry Monument		Hancock Avenue; 39.810648°N 77.235518°W	Unknown sculptor	1888	MN 247	
150th Pennsylvania Infantry Monument		Stone-Meredith Avenue; 39.83688°N 77.25223°W	Ryegate Granite Company	1889	MN 32-B	
151st Pennsylvania Infantry Monument		South Reynolds Avenue, near Herbst Woods; 39.83375°N 77.25103°W	Unknown sculptor	1888	MN 42-B	
153rd Pennsylvania Infantry Monument		Barlow's Knoll, Howard Avenue; 39.845684°N 77.226152°W	Fredrick & Field	1889	MN 68-B	
153rd Pennsylvania Infantry Monument		Wainwright Avenue; 39.821641°N 77.22742°W	Unknown sculptor	1884	MN 301	Marks the position of the regiment on July 2, 1863.
155th Pennsylvania Infantry Monument		Little Round Top; 39.792964°N 77.236508°W	Ryegate Granite Company	1886	MN 101-B	The statue was added to the monument in 1889.
1st Pennsylvania Reserves, 30th Infantry Regiment Monument		Ayres Avenue; 39.79665°N 77.24062°W	Smith Granite Company	1890	MN 134-B	
Company K, 1st Pennsylvania Reserves, 30th Infantry Regiment Monument		Stoever-Schick Building, Lincoln Square		1991		Company K was made up of men from the Gettysburg area.
2nd Pennsylvania Reserves, 31st Infantry Regiment Monument		Ayres Avenue; 39.796275°N 77.241204°W	Smith Granite Company	1890	MN 133-B	Topped by a Maltese Cross
5th Pennsylvania Reserves, 34th Infantry Regiment Monument		Big Round Top; 39.78644°N 77.239058°W	Smith Granite Company	1890	MN 375-B	
6th Pennsylvania Reserves, 35th Infantry Regiment Monument		Wheatfield Road; 39.797524°N 77.240099°W	Smith Granite Company	1890	MN 123-B	
9th Pennsylvania Reserves, 38th Infantry Regiment Monument		Warren Avenue; 39.78965°N 77.236965°W	Smith Granite Company	1890	MN 90-B	"By a Comrade's Grave"
10th Pennsylvania Reserves, 39th Infantry Regiment Monument		Warren & Sykes Avenues; 39.7887°N 77.23694°W	Frederick Kohlhagen, sculptor Gorham Manufacturing Company, foundry	1890	MN 88-D	Skirmishers
11th Pennsylvania Reserves, 40th Infantry Regiment Monument		Ayres Avenue; 39.7970°N 77.24009°W	Smith Granite Company	1890	MN 135-B	
12th Pennsylvania Reserves, 41st Infantry Regiment Monument		Big Round Top; 39.7863°N 77.2393°W	Smith Granite Company	1890	MN 373-B	
13th Pennsylvania Reserves, 42nd Infantry Regiment Monument "Bucktails"		Ayres Avenue, at Rose Grove; 39.79525°N 77.24135°W	Smith Granite Company	1890	MN 132-B	
26th Pennsylvania Emergency Militia Marker		Chambersburg Pike, 3 miles west of Gettysburg		1912	MN 48-A	
26th Pennsylvania Emergency Militia Monument		Chambersburg Pike & Springs Avenue; 39.830983°N 77.236972°W	Edward Ludwig Albert Pausch, sculptor Smith Granite Company	1892	MN 48-B	Organized at Harrisburg on June 22, 1863, in response to an anticipated invasion of Pennsylvania by the Confederate Army, the regiment consisted of 750 mostly young men. Hastily trained and inexperienced, they fought at Gettysburg, and were mustered out 4 weeks later.
RHODE ISLAND
Battery A, 1st Rhode Island Light Artillery Monument		Hancock Avenue; 39.813551°N 77.235456°W	Smith Granite Company	1886	MN 219-D	
Battery B, 1st Rhode Island Light Artillery Monument "Brown's Battery B"		Hancock Avenue; 39.812315°N 77.235411°W	John Flaherty, sculptor	1886	MN 243-C	
Battery E, 1st Rhode Island Artillery Monument "Randolph's Battery E"		Emmitsburg Road; 39.80235°N 77.2494°W	Smith Granite Company	1886	MN 188-B	
2nd Rhode Island Infantry Monument		Sedgwick Avenue; 39.795597°N 77.234104°W	Smith Granite Company	1886	MN 108-A	
VERMONT
1st Regiment Vermont Cavalry Monument		John Snyder Farm; 39.7869°N 77.243801°W	Wells, Lamson & Company	1889	MN 85	
1st Vermont Infantry Brigade Monument		Wright Avenue; 39.784973°N 77.232374°W	C.W. Reed, designer H.W. Beattie, sculptor Carrick Brothers	1889	MN 376	
Stannard's Vermont Brigade Monument; 2nd Vermont Infantry Brigade; Vermont State Monument		Hancock Avenue; 39.80945°N 77.23636°W	Karl Gerhardt sculptor Frederick & Field	1889	MN 250	The Corinthian column is topped by a bronze statue of Brigadier-General George Stannard.
13th Vermont Infantry Monument		Hancock Avenue; 39.809665°N 77.236269°W	James H. Walling, designer F. Moynehan, sculptor Gorham Manufacturing Company, foundry	1899	MN 249-C	13th Vermont Infantry/Stephen F. Brown
14th Vermont Volunteer Infantry Monument		Hancock Avenue; 39.80882°N 77.236594°W	Estabrook Granite Works, Bennington, VT	1889	MN 253	
16th Vermont Infantry Monument		Hancock Avenue; 39.809134°N 77.236551°W	Unknown sculptor	1892	MN 252	
Vermont Sharpshooters Monument (Company F, 1st United States Sharpshooters)		Pitzer Woods, Berdan Avenue; 39.80812°N 77.257118°W	F. Moynehan, sculptor	1898	MN 74	
Vermont Sharpshooters Monument (Companies E & H, 2nd United States Sharpshooters)		Granite Farm Lane; 39.788971°N 77.246873°W	F. Moynehan, sculptor	1889	MN 84	
WEST VIRGINIA
Battery C, 1st West Virginia Artillery Monument		National Cemetery; 39.81878°N 77.231575°W	Unknown sculptor	1898	MN 284-B	
1st West Virginia Cavalry Monument		Taneytown Road; 39.808668°N 77.230652°W	John M. Gessler & Sons	1898	MN 274	
3rd West Virginia Cavalry Monument		Buford Avenue; 39.84359°N 77.247926°W	Unknown sculptor	1898	MN 2	
7th West Virginia Infantry Monument		East Cemetery Hill; 39.82169°N 77.22899°W	Spragg Granite & Marble Works	1898	MN 304-C	
WISCONSIN
2nd Wisconsin Infantry Monument		Stone-Meredith Avenue; 39.83555°N 77.25387°W	Unknown sculptor	1888	MN 35-D	
3rd Wisconsin Infantry Monument		Colgrove Avenue; 39.81251°N 77.21598°W	Unknown sculptor	1888	MN 341-B	
5th Wisconsin Infantry Monument		Howe Avenue; 39.78318°N 77.22723°W	Unknown sculptor	1888	MN 380-B	
6th Wisconsin Infantry Monument		North Reynolds Avenue; 39.83741°N 77.24813°W	B & M Granite Company	1888	MN 26-C	
7th Wisconsin Infantry Monument		McPherson Woods, Stone-Meredith Avenue; 39.835747°N 77.253888°W	B & M Granite Company	1888	MN 34-C	
26th Wisconsin Infantry Monument		East Howard Avenue; 39.8434°N 77.2293°W	Ryegate Granite Company	1888	MN 63-B	
Wisconsin Sharpshooters Monument (Company G, 1st United States Sharpshooters)		Emmitsburg Road; 39.80805°N 77.2444°W	Ryegate Granite Company	1888	MN 198	

== Other monuments ==
Other monuments on the Gettysburg Battlefield
Name	Image	Location/GPS Coordinates	Designer/Sculptor	Year	MN ID	Comments
Civil War Women's Memorial		Evergreen Cemetery; 39.820609°N 77.229231°W	Ron Tunison	2002		Depicts Elizabeth Thorn, the Evergreen Cemetery caretaker who buried 100 fallen soldiers while six months pregnant amid the summer heat.
Brevet-Major-General Charles H. T. Collis Memorial		Gettysburg National Cemetery; 39.81994°N 77.23197°W	Unknown sculptor	1906	MN 406	Gen. Collis, a colonel in 1863, was not present at the Battle of Gettysburg.
Culp Brothers Memorial; Brother Against Brother Memorial		Steinwehr Avenue; 39°49.188′N 77°14.06′W	Gary Casteel, sculptor	2013		Honors Confederate Pvt. John Wesley Culp and his brother, Union Lt. William E. Culp. Located near Gettysburg Heritage Center (formerly American Civil War Museum).
Eternal Light Peace Memorial		Oak Hill; 39.84848°N 77.24344°W	Paul Philippe Cret, designer Lee Lawrie, sculptor	1938	MN 6	
Friend to Friend Masonic Memorial		Gettysburg National Cemetery; 39.8210°N 77.23177°W	Ron Tunison, sculptor Tallix, foundry	1994	MN 829	Honors "Confederate and Union Masons"
Grand Army of the Republic Memorial; Albert Woolson Memorial		Ziegler's Grove	Avard Fairbanks, sculptor Roman Bronze Works	1956	MN 212	Honors Albert Woolson (1847–1956), the last surviving Union veteran of the American Civil War. Another casting is in Duluth, Minnesota, Woolson's home town.
Gregg Cavalry Shaft		East Cavalry Field; 39.826414°N 77.162993°W	P. F. Eisenbrown, designer Eagle Granite Works, Reading, PA	1884	MN 387	Site of the July 3, 1863 battle between the U.S. Cavalry, led by Gen. David Gregg, and the CSA Cavalry, led by Gen. J.E.B. Stuart.
High Water Mark of the Rebellion Monument		The Angle; 39.812467°N 77.23573°W	John B. Bachelder, designer Henry-Bonnard Bronze Company, foundry	1892	MN 230	Honors the dead and wounded of Pickett's Charge, the deepest penetration of Confederate forces into the Union line.
Kentucky State Monument		Gettysburg National Cemetery	Unknown sculptor	1975	MN 286	Honors Abraham Lincoln, born in Kentucky.
Lincoln Address Memorial		Gettysburg National Cemetery; 39.81754°N 77.231854°W	Henry K. Bush-Brown, sculptor Louis R. Henrick, designer Smith Granite Company (ordered by Van Amringe Granite Company)	1912	MN 281	Bust by Henry K. Bush-Brown.
"Return Visit" Lincoln Statue		David Wills House; 8 Lincoln Square; 39.830667°N 77.230833°W	John Seward Johnson II, sculptor	1991		President Lincoln was the houseguest of David Wills, the night before giving his Gettysburg Address. The Wills House is now a museum.
Maryland State Monument		Taneytown Road	Lawrence Monroe Ludtke, sculptor Codori Memorials	1994	MN 830	Depicts two soldiers - one Union, one Confederate, helping each other up. Signifies the fact that Marylanders were divided in their allegiance in the war and often knew each other.
John Page Nicholson Marker		Ziegler's Grove; 39.814462°N 77.235218°W	Emmor Cope	1922	MN 396	Lt. Nicholson (1842-1922) was a veteran of the battle, a military historian, and served as Chairman of the Gettysburg National Military Park Commission, 1893–1922.
Soldiers' National Monument		Gettysburg National Cemetery; 39.819801°N 77.231198°W	Randolph Rogers, sculptor George Keller, architect (New England Granite Works)	1869	MN 288	Honors "All Soldiers at Gettysburg"
"Jennie Wade Memorial"		Evergreen Cemetery; 39.819702°N 77.230386°W	Anna M. Miller	1901	MN ?	A civilian casualty of the battle
