= Black Aggie =

Felix Agnus grave sculpture, subject of Maryland folklore

The Agnus grave prior to the statue's removal.

Black Aggie is the folkloric name given to a statue formerly placed on the grave of General Felix Agnus in Druid Ridge Cemetery in Pikesville, Maryland, United States. It is an unauthorized replica – rendered by Edward Ludwig Albert Pausch – of sculptor Augustus Saint-Gaudens' 1891 allegorical figure, popularly called “Grief”, at the Adams Memorial in Rock Creek Cemetery in Washington, D.C. The statue is of a somber seated figure in a cowl or shroud.

== History ==
Beginning with its installation in 1926, the replica was surrounded by many urban legends, principally that someone spending a night in its lap would be haunted by the ghosts of those buried there; that the spirits of individuals buried at Druid Ridge would annually convene at the statue; that no grass would grow on the ground where the statue's shadow would lie during the daytime; or that the statue would animate itself during the night, whether by physically moving or by showing glowing red eyes.

These legends led to much unwelcome attention toward the statue; many people were caught breaking into the cemetery at night to visit it, and the pedestal was frequently vandalized. The Agnus family, disturbed by the attention the statue received, donated it to the Smithsonian in 1967. It sat for many years in storage at the National Museum of American Art (later named the Smithsonian American Art Museum) where an authorized recasting of the original Adams Memorial statue now sits.

Black Aggie was moved from her previous home at the museum to a courtyard behind the Dolley Madison House on Lafayette Square in Washington, D.C. The bare, blank pedestal remains at the statue's former home at Druid Ridge Cemetery.

In 2026, local community groups began to advocate for the return of the statue back to Pikesville. This is for the purpose of preserving local history and promoting tourism.
