= North Carolina State Monument (Gettysburg, Pennsylvania) =

Coordinates: 39.81833°N 77.247258°W

North Carolina Monument
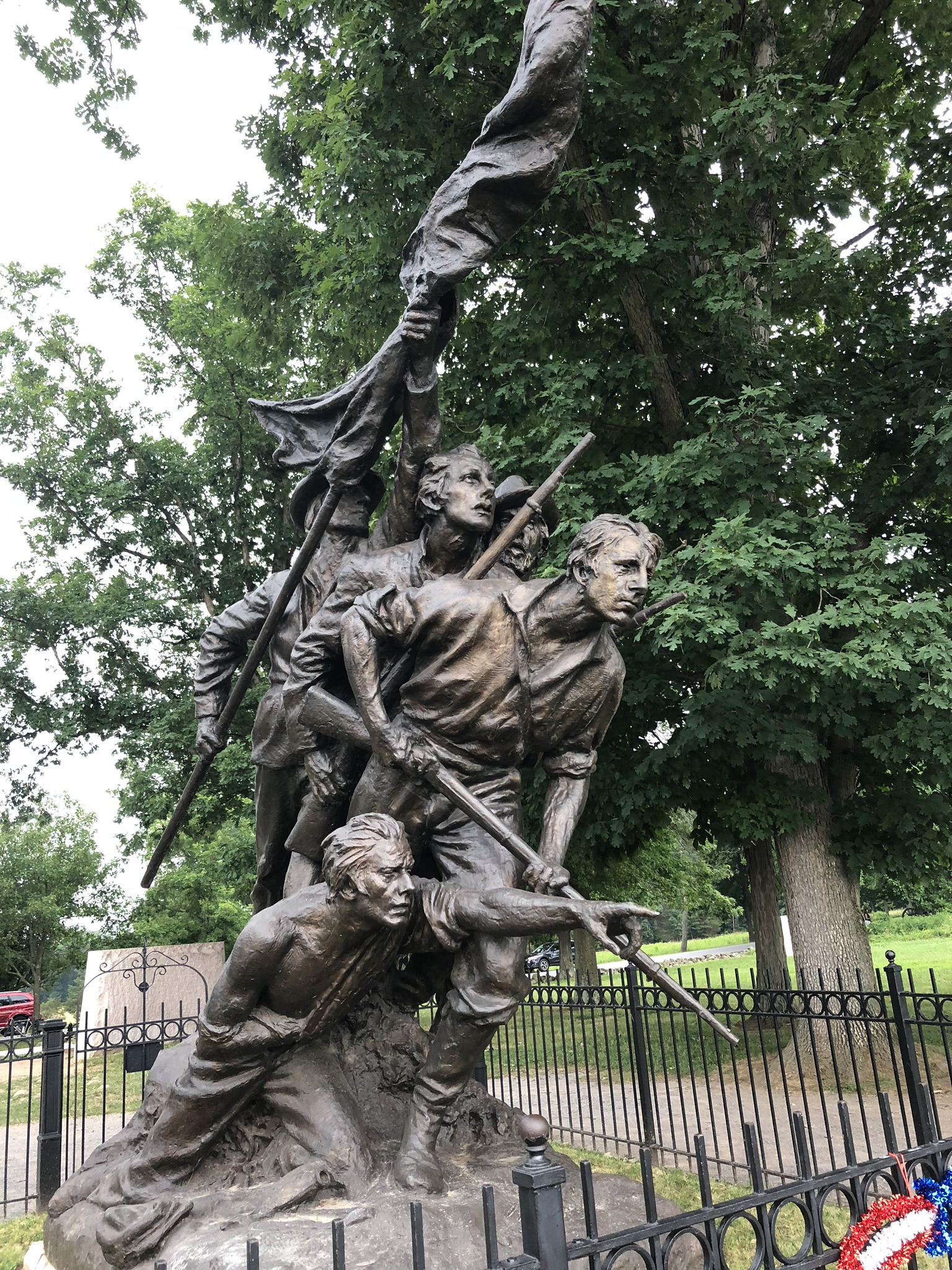
- Interactive map of North Carolina Monument
- Location: Seminary Ridge, Gettysburg National Military Park
- Beginning date: 1928
- Completion date: July 3, 1929

The North Carolina Monument is a North Carolina memorial of the American Civil War commemorating the 32 Carolina regiments in action at the Battle of Gettysburg. The monument is a public artwork by American sculptor Gutzon Borglum located on Seminary Ridge, West Confederate Avenue, in the Gettysburg National Military Park.

== Description ==
Surrounded by dogwood trees (the North Carolina state flower), the monument features figures of North Carolina infantrymen advancing during Pickett's Charge, where fifteen infantry regiments from North Carolina participated and suffered heavy casualties. One man kneels injured on the ground, pointing towards the enemy with his proper left hand while two men wield guns and look forward. A fourth man holds a flag in both hands as he glances forward. The sculpture is signed "Gutzon Borglum 1929 (illegible) AKUNST FDY NYC". The back of the base is inscribed: "NORTH CAROLINA".

== History ==
A 1913 North Carolina commission of Civil War veterans presented a monument proposal after visiting the Gettysburg Battlefield, and after World War I, the North Carolina United Daughters of the Confederacy and Governor Angus McLean continued the planning in 1927. with a commission visiting the battlefield on September 28, 1926. North Carolina appropriated $50,000 to purchase and landscape the site and to commission Gutzon Borglum, who was approached while working on Mount Rushmore. Borglum designed the monument in Texas and posed the Confederate flag designer (Orren Smith) as the flag bearer, while the other soldiers were sculpted from photographs of posed Confederate soldiers. Postponed from May 1929, the US Navy and 6th Field Artillery bands played at the monument's dedicationon July 3, 1929. By 1949, a glass-faced display at the site, and a wooden marker for the site was cut down by vandals in 1954. President Kennedy left his car to visit the monument in April 1963 prior to the rededication on the 100th anniversary. After a 1985 restoration required lifting by helicopter for shipment to Cincinnati, a fence was added in 1993; and after the 1995 Smithsonian's Save Outdoor Sculpture! survey reported the sculpture needed treatment, the monument was rehabilitated in 1999.

== Images ==
External image
- 1929 dedication

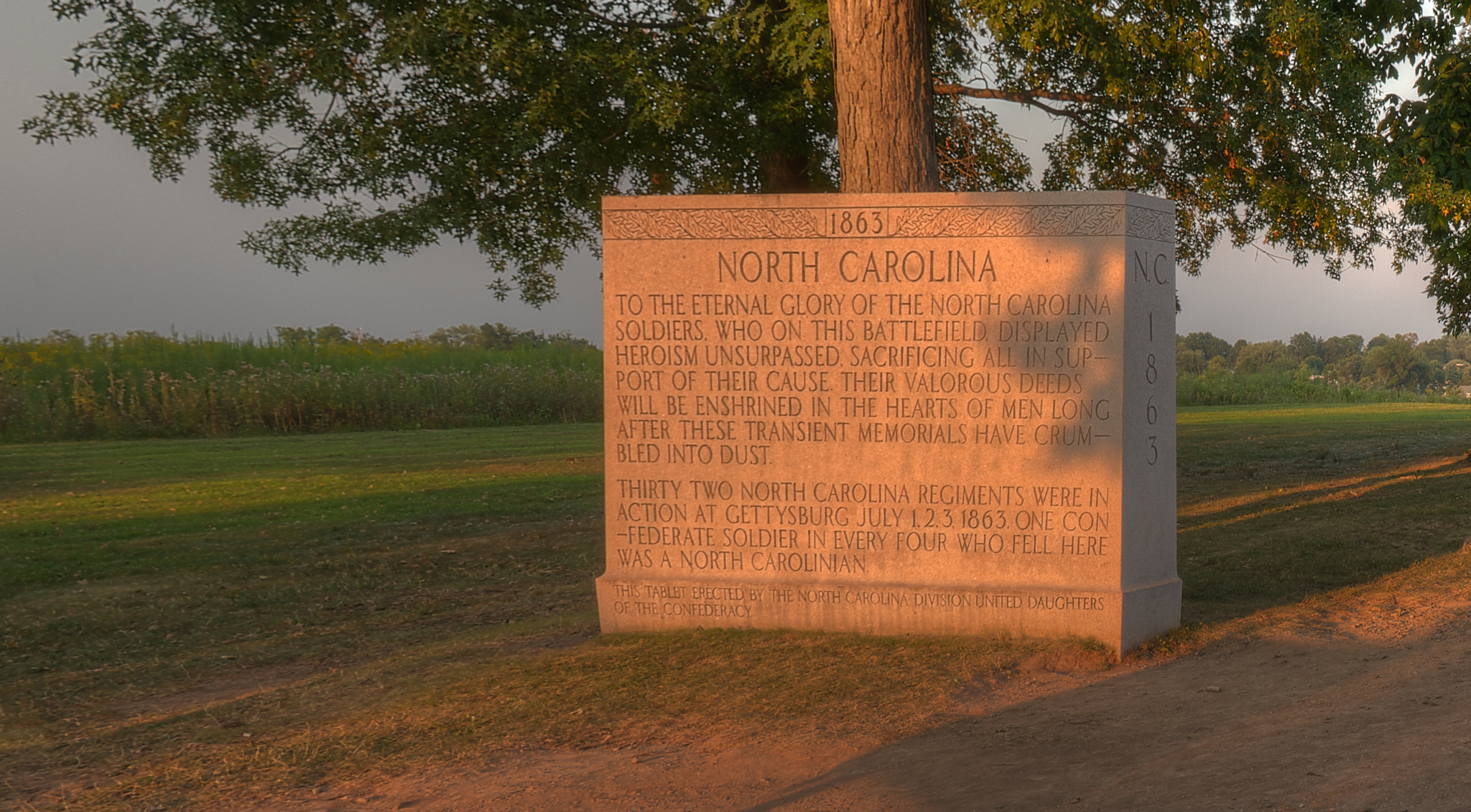
Detail of inscription at North Carolina Monument

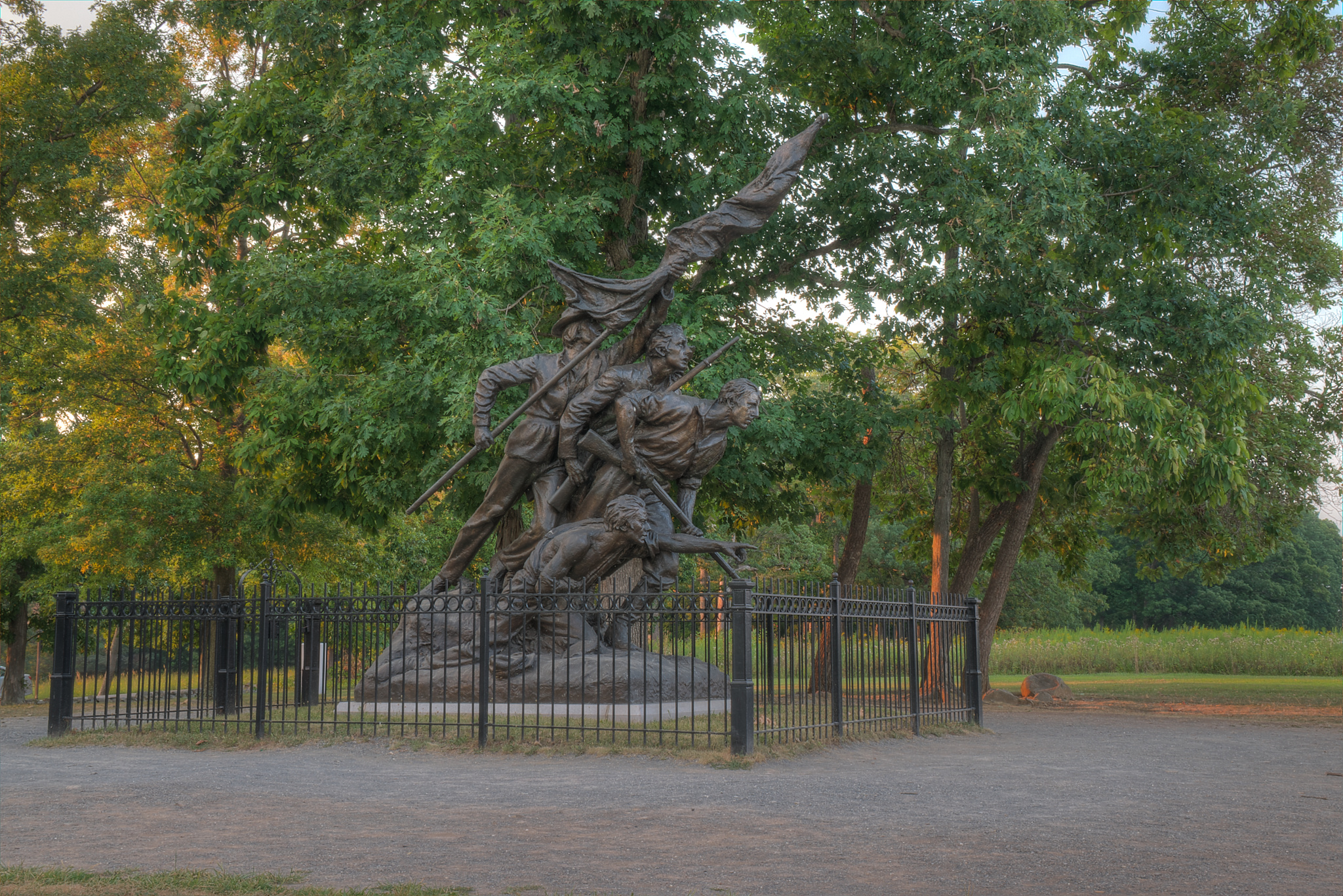
North Carolina Monument (side view)

== See also ==
- List of monuments of the Gettysburg Battlefield
