= Smith Granite Company =

Smith Granite Company In 1845 Orlando Smith discovered a granite outcrop on the property owned by Joshua Babcock in Westerly, Rhode Island, and a year later purchased the site from him. He established a granite quarry shortly thereafter and by the 1850s was cutting granite monuments. In 1887 the Smith Granite Company was incorporated, with family members holding all the stock.

The company's sculptors included James G. C. Hamilton, Edward Ludwig Albert Pausch, Robert D. Barr, and Stanley Edwards.

== Works ==
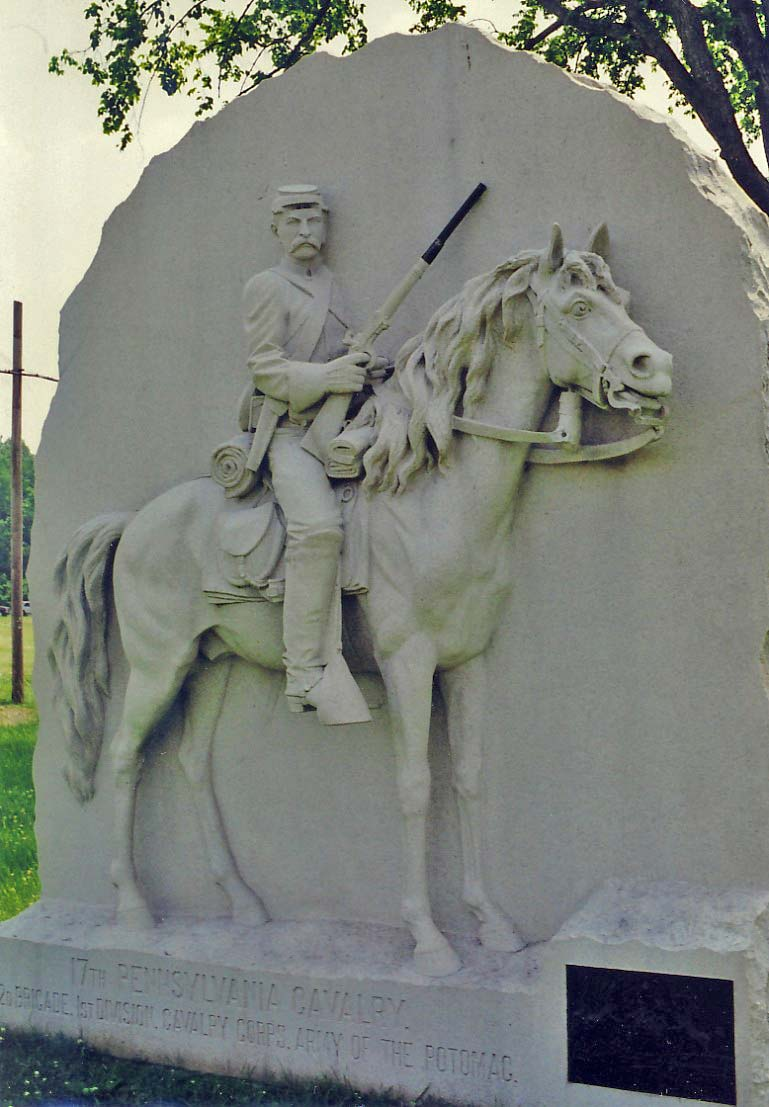
17th Pennsylvania Monument, Gettysburg Battlefield

The firm is best remembered for creating Civil War monuments.

- Gettysburg Battlefield, at least 57 monuments.
- Chickamauga and Chattanooga National Military Park, at least 16 monuments.
- as well as numerous other Civil War monuments including ones in:

Norfolk, Connecticut, 1870
Galena, Illinois, 1883
Danbury, Connecticut, 1894
Gardner, Massachusetts, 1885
New Haven, Connecticut, 1887
Meadville, Pennsylvania, 1891
Big Rapids, Michigan, 1892
Ypsilanti, Michigan, 1895
New London, Connecticut, 1896
Norwalk, Connecticut, 1900
Wallingford, Connecticut, 1902
Norwich, Connecticut, 1902
New Haven, Connecticut, 1905
Griswold, Connecticut, 1913

- Firemen's Monument, New London, Connecticut, 1898
- World War I monument, Templeton, Massachusetts, 1922
- the bases or granite components of many public monuments including:

General William Tecumseh Sherman Monument, Washington D.C.
