= Edward Ludwig Albert Pausch =

Danish-American sculptor

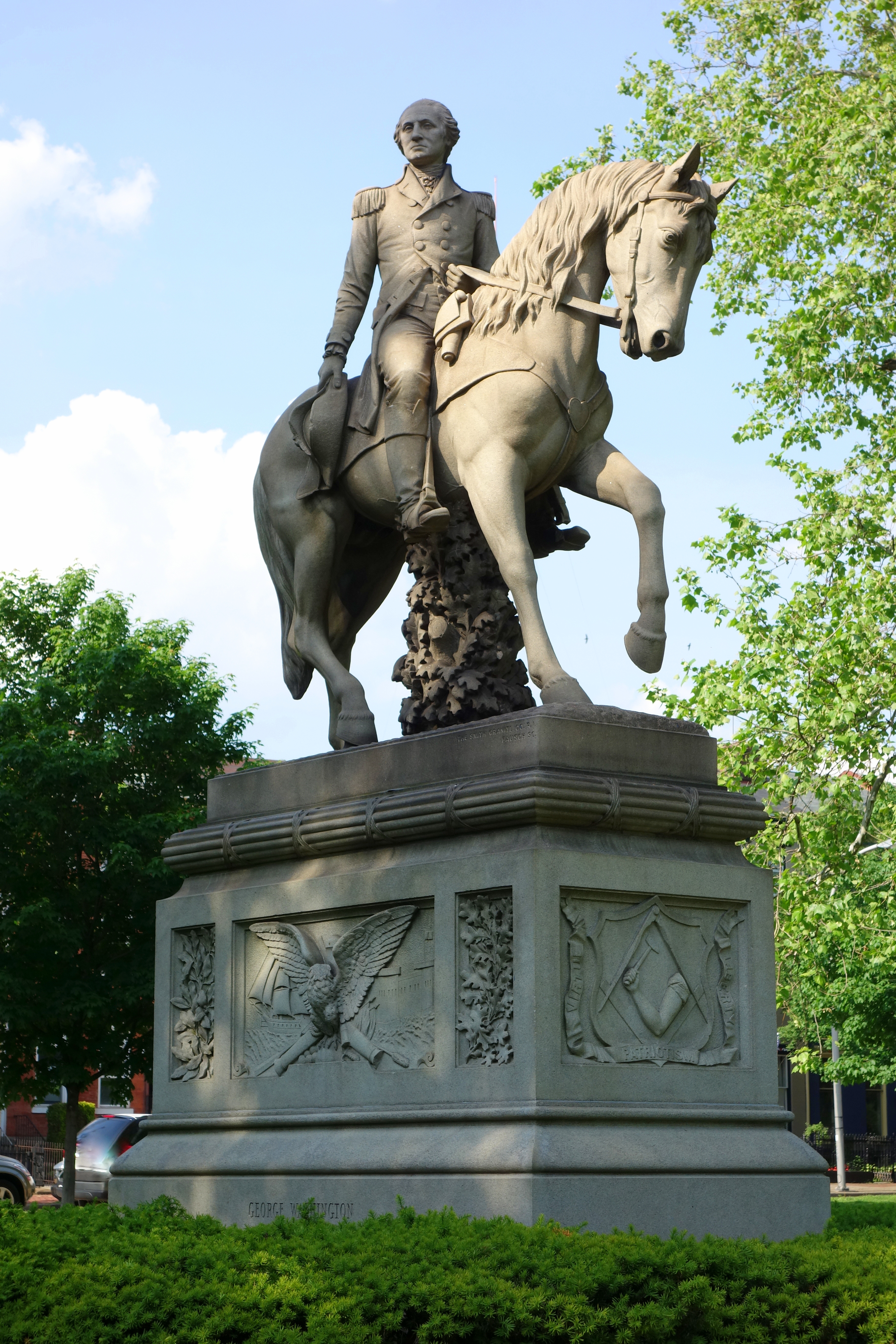
George Washington Memorial (1889–91), Pittsburgh, Pennsylvania.

Edward Ludwig Albert Pausch (September 30, 1856 – 1931) was a Danish-American sculptor noted for his war memorials.

== Life ==
He was born in Copenhagen, Denmark, the son of Henry and Annette P. Pausch. The family emigrated to Hartford, Connecticut when he was a child. He apprenticed for eleven years under Carl Conrads in Hartford, beginning at age 14. He worked as an assistant to Domingo Mora in New York City for six years, and with Karl Gerhardt in Hartford for three years. In 1889, he joined sculptor James G. C. Hamilton at the Smith Granite Company in Westerly, Rhode Island.

Pausch's most ambitious work, created while at Smith Granite Company, is the George Washington Memorial (1889–91) in Pittsburgh, Pennsylvania. A one-and-one-half-lifesize equestrian statue carved from granite, it depicts Washington as a 23-year-old colonel in the French and Indian War. He modeled the head on Houdon's bust.

Smith Granite Company created at least fifty-seven monuments for the Gettysburg Battlefield, and at least sixteen monuments for Chickamauga and Chattanooga National Military Park. —seven of these have been documented to Pausch. Van Amringe Granite Company (sub-contracting with Smith Granite Company) created six monuments for the Antietam Battlefield—all documented to Pausch.

Pausch opened his own studio in Hartford in 1900. Within hours of President William McKinley's assassination on September 14, 1901, he was summoned from Hartford to Buffalo, New York to make the death mask. He made a plaster cast the following morning, and completed the mask in about a month. He later used it to model a bust of the late president for the Philadelphia Main Post Office (1902), and his McKinley statue (1903–05) in Reading, Pennsylvania.

Pausch settled permanently in Buffalo, opening a studio at Delaware & Delavan Avenues. Among his students were sculptors Robert D. Barr, Stanley Edwards, and William Stephenson. He exhibited at the Albright Art Gallery in 1919.

Pausch married Julia Ellenberger of Hartford in 1878. The spelling of his first name alternates between "Edward" and "Eduard."

=== Black Aggie ===
His most infamous work, Black Aggie (1906–07), is an unauthorized near-copy of Augustus Saint-Gaudens's 1891 Adams Memorial. General Felix Agnus was led to believe that he was ordering a cast from Saint-Gaudens's original molds for the Angus family plot in Druid Ridge Cemetery, Pikesville, Maryland. John Salter, a granite supplier in Connecticut, misled Agnus and hired Pausch to model the freehand bronze copy. Saint-Gaudens's widow sued Salter, and won a court judgment. Pausch's actions were publicly denounced by sculptors such as Karl Bitter and Daniel Chester French, which dealt a serious blow to his professional reputation. The bootleg statue remained in the cemetery, and became the subject of ghost stories and urban legends. Following repeated acts of vandalism, it was removed and donated to the Smithsonian Institution in 1967 (as a work by Saint-Gaudens). Deaccessioned, it is now installed in the courtyard between the Cutts-Madison House and the National Courts Building in Washington, D.C.

== Selected works ==
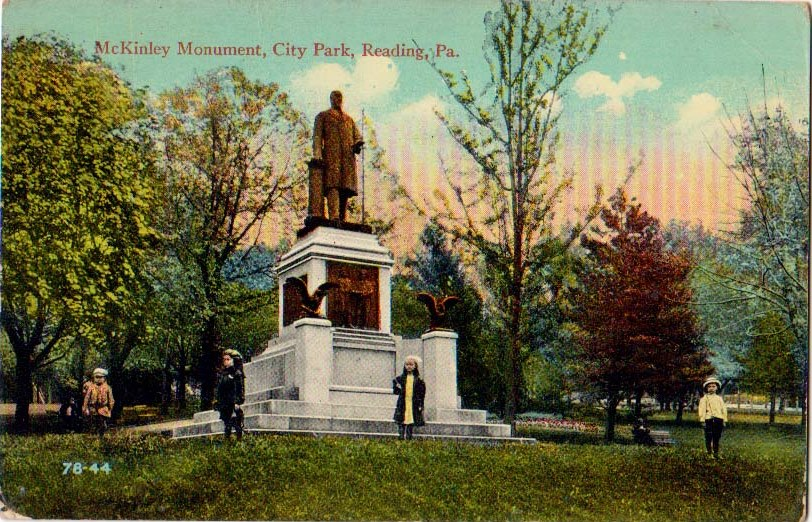
McKinley Memorial (1903–05), City Park, Reading, Pennsylvania.

- Equestrian Statue of George Washington, George Washington Memorial (1889–91), Allegheny Commons Park, Pittsburgh, Pennsylvania.
- Death mask of President William McKinley (1901), Smithsonian Institution, Washington, D.C.
- Bust of President William McKinley (1902), Main Post Office, Philadelphia, Pennsylvania. Relocated to Waterworks Park, Canton, Ohio (McKinley's hometown), 1959.
- President William McKinley, McKinley Memorial (1903–05), City Park, Reading, Pennsylvania.
- Black Aggie, Agnus Memorial (circa 1906–07), Druid Ridge Cemetery, Pikesville, Maryland. Relocated to the Cutts-Madison House, Washington, D.C.
- Bust of Elbert Hubbard (1916), McLean County Historical Society, Bloomington, Illinois.

=== Soldiers' monuments ===
- Seneca County Soldiers' Monument (1884–85), Frost Parkway, Tiffin, Ohio.
- Soldiers' Monument (1889), St. Bernard Cemetery, New Haven, Connecticut.
- Soldiers' Memorial Monument (1890–91), Diamond Park, Meadville, Pennsylvania.
- Mecosta County Soldiers' Monument (1893), Mecosta County Courthouse, Big Rapids, Michigan.
- Ypsilanti Civil War Memorial (1895), Highland Cemetery, Ypsilanti, Michigan.
- Rhode Island Soldiers Home Monument (1901–02), North Burial Ground, Bristol, Rhode Island.
- Guernsey County Soldiers' Monument (1902–03), Guernsey County Courthouse, Cambridge, Ohio.
- Broadway Civil War Monument (1905), Broadway Triangle, 318 Elm Street, New Haven, Connecticut. Pausch modeled the Artilleryman figure; Stanley Edwards modeled the Infantryman figure.

=== Battlefield monuments ===
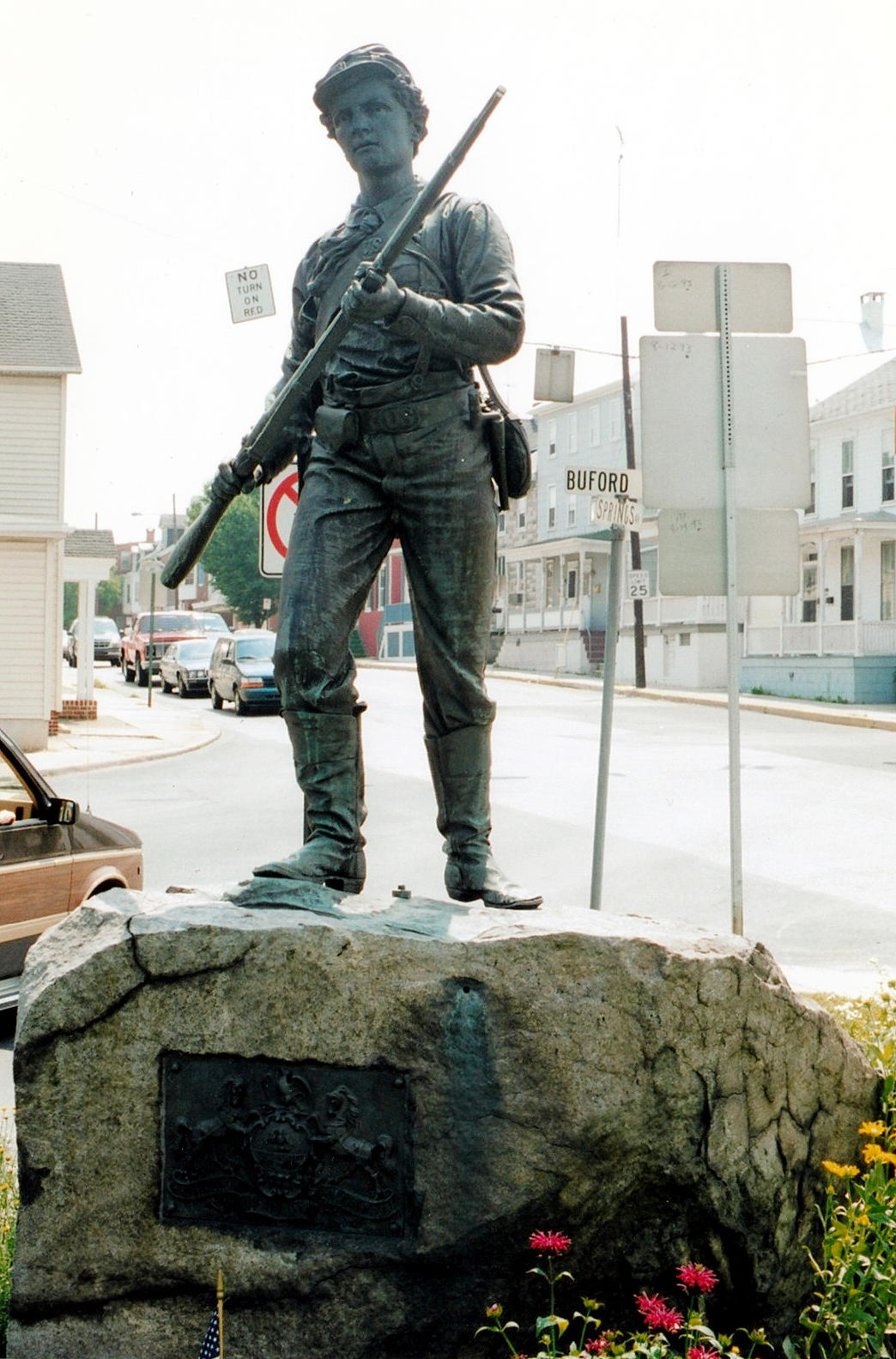
26th Pennsylvania Emergency Militia Monument (1892), Gettysburg, Pennsylvania.

==== Gettysburg Battlefield, Gettysburg, Pennsylvania ====
- 13th Massachusetts Volunteer Infantry Monument (1885), Robinson Avenue.
- 26th Pennsylvania Emergency Militia Monument (1892), Chambersburg Pike & West Street.

==== Chickamauga and Chattanooga National Military Park ====
- 10th Wisconsin Infantry Monument (1895).
- 77th Pennsylvania Infantry Regiment Monument, Brock's Field (1897).
- 3rd Maryland Infantry & Latrobe's Battery Monument, Orchard Knob (1902–03). The monument's base originally featured two soldier figures, one Union and one Confederate, but these were removed following repeated vandalism.
- Ohio State Monument, Missionary Ridge (1902–03).
- 7th Pennsylvania Cavalry Monument (circa 1905).

==== Antietam Battlefield, Sharpsburg, Maryland ====
- 12th Pennsylvania Cavalry Monument (1904).
- 45th Pennsylvania Volunteer Infantry Monument (1904).
- 51st Pennsylvania Volunteer Infantry Monument (1904).
- 125th Pennsylvania Infantry Monument (1904).
- "Durell's Battery," Independent Battery D, Pennsylvania Artillery Monument (1904).
- 128th Pennsylvania Volunteer Infantry Monument (circa 1905).
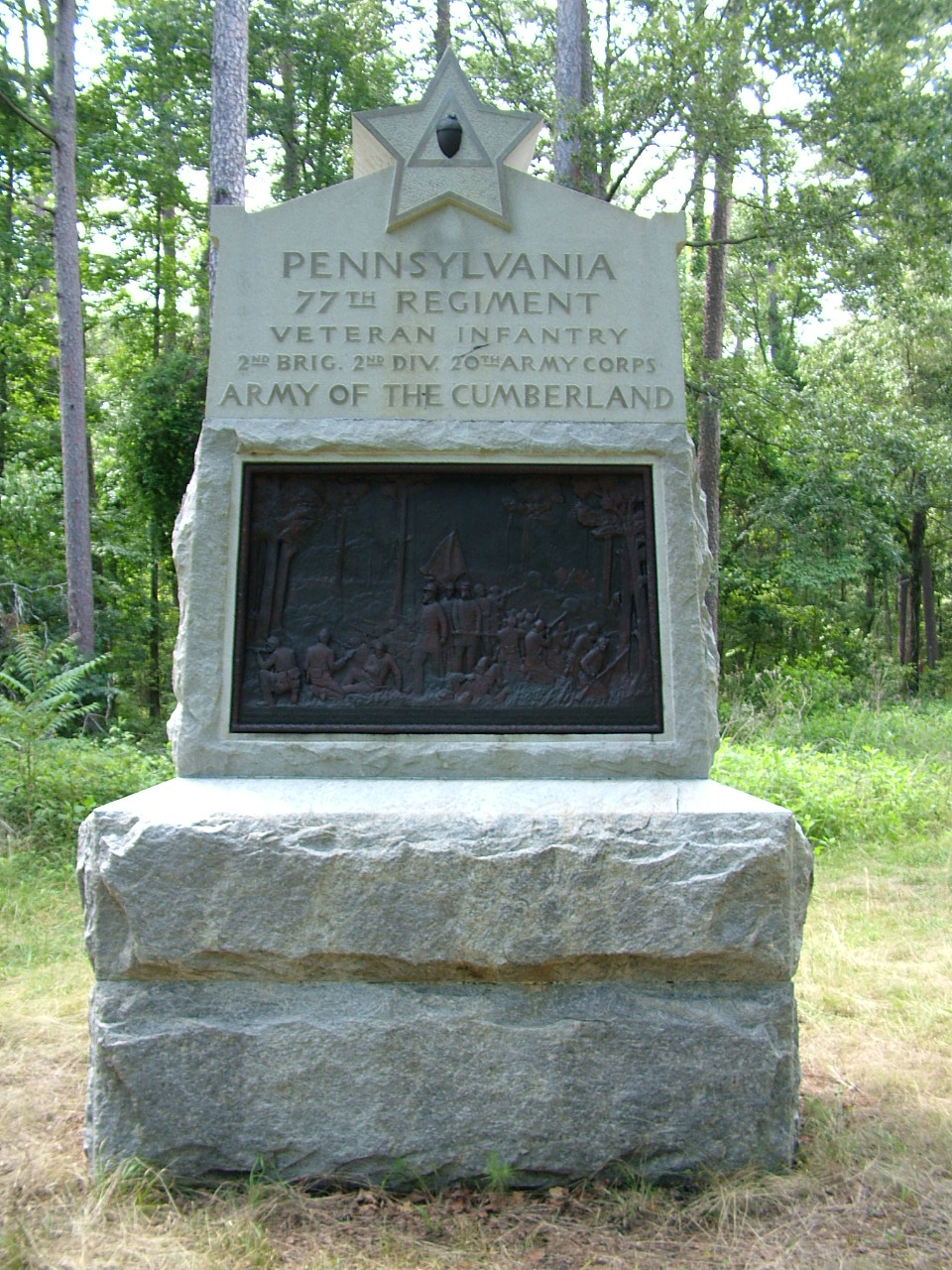
77th Pennsylvania Infantry Regiment Monument (1897), Chickamauga and Chattanooga National Military Park.

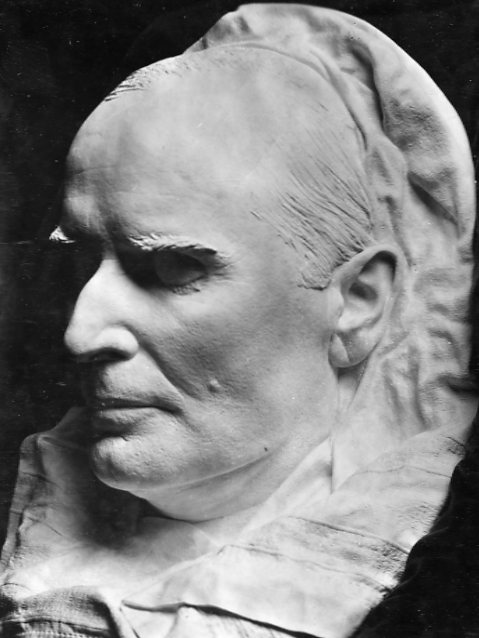
Death mask of President William McKinley (1901).

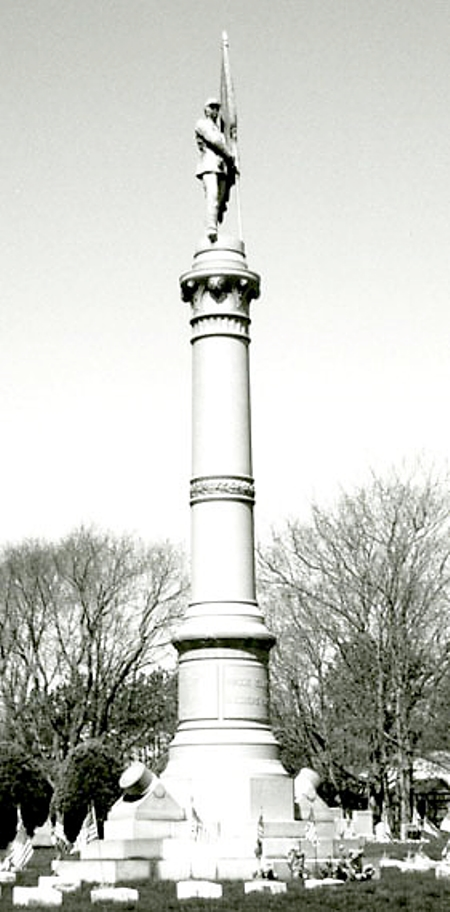
Rhode Island Soldiers Home Monument (1901–02), Bristol, Rhode Island.

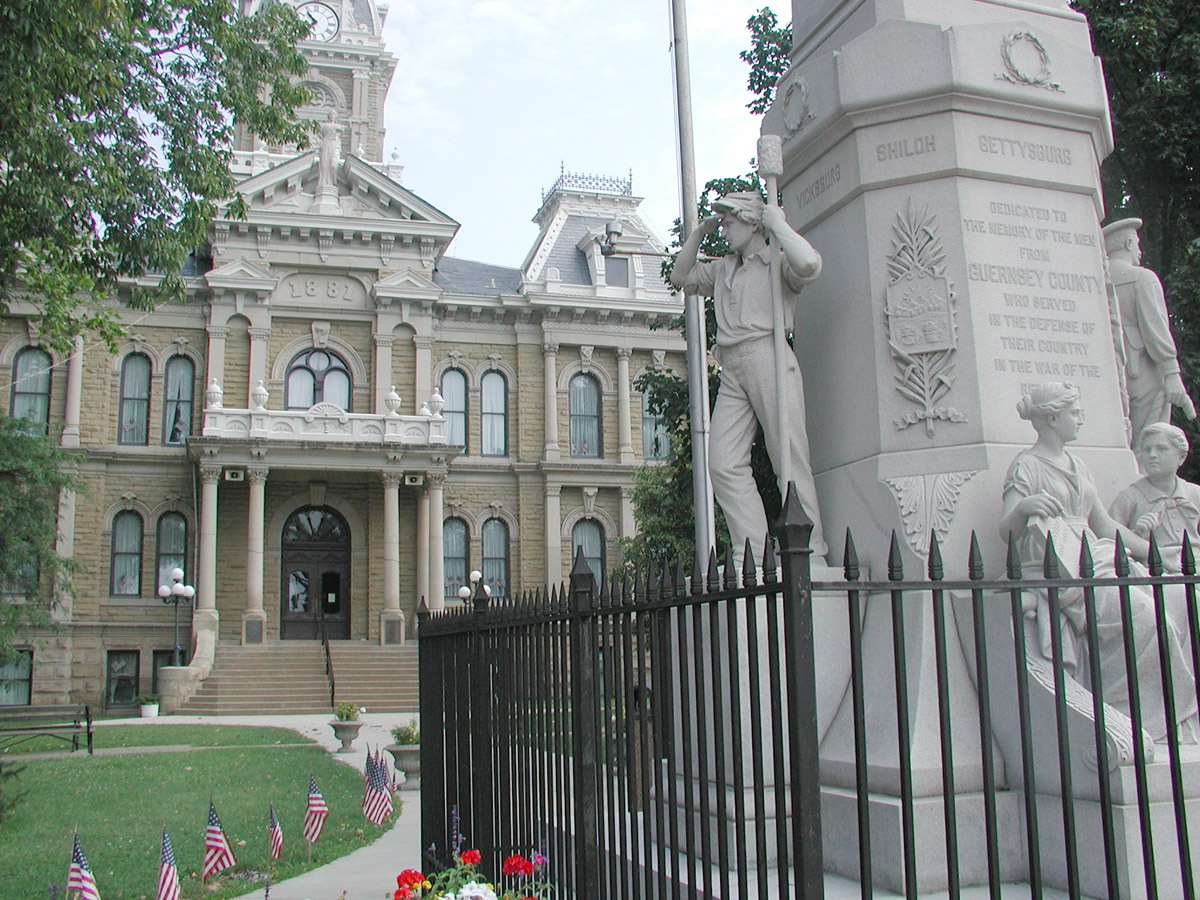
Guernsey County Soldiers' Monument (1902–03), Cambridge, Ohio.

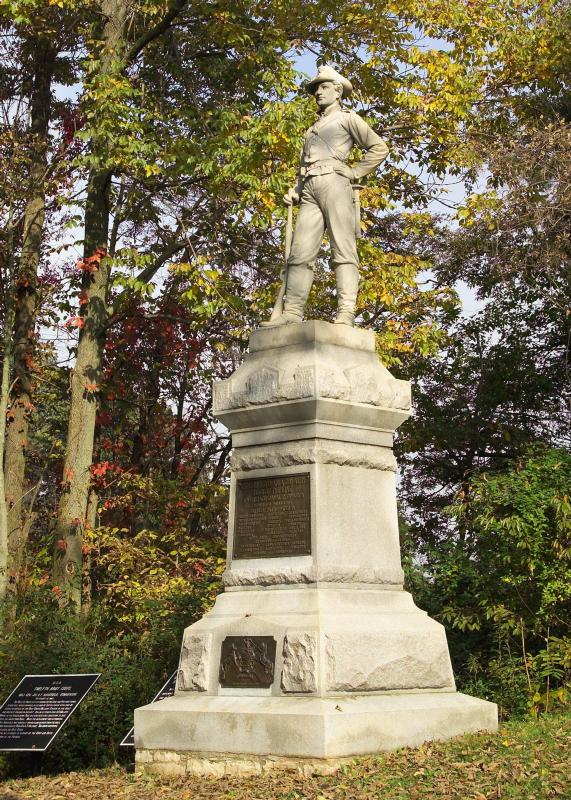
12th Pennsylvania Cavalry Monument (1904), Antietam Battlefield.

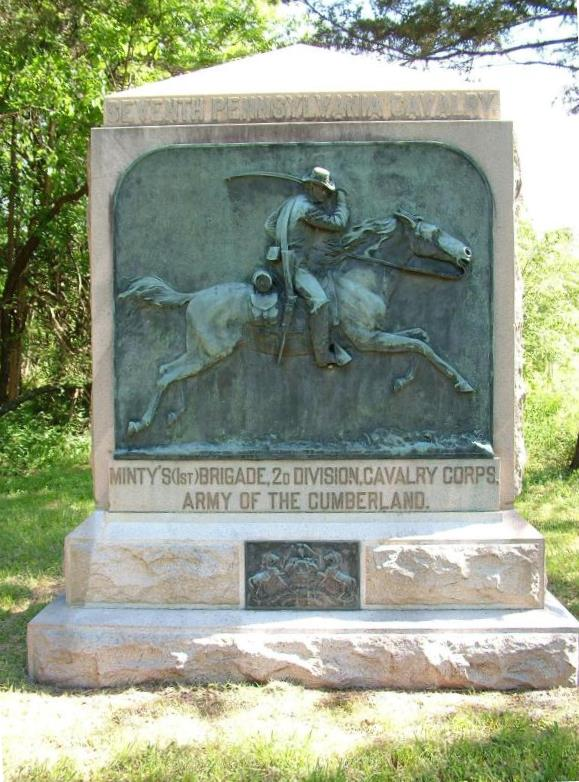
7th Pennsylvania Cavalry Monument (circa 1905), Chickamauga and Chattanooga National Military Park.
