= 1892 =

1892 in various calendars
- Gregorian calendar: 1892; MDCCCXCII
- Ab urbe condita: 2645
- Armenian calendar: 1341; ԹՎ ՌՅԽԱ
- Assyrian calendar: 6642
- Baháʼí calendar: 48–49
- Balinese saka calendar: 1813–1814
- Bengali calendar: 1298–1299
- Berber calendar: 2842
- British Regnal year: 55 Vict. 1 – 56 Vict. 1
- Buddhist calendar: 2436
- Burmese calendar: 1254
- Byzantine calendar: 7400–7401
- Chinese calendar: 辛卯年 (Metal Rabbit); 4589 or 4382 — to — 壬辰年 (Water Dragon); 4590 or 4383
- Coptic calendar: 1608–1609
- Discordian calendar: 3058
- Ethiopian calendar: 1884–1885
- Hebrew calendar: 5652–5653
- Hindu calendars
- Vikram Samvat: 1948–1949
- Shaka Samvat: 1813–1814
- Kali Yuga: 4992–4993
- Holocene calendar: 11892
- Igbo calendar: 892–893
- Iranian calendar: 1270–1271
- Islamic calendar: 1309–1310
- Japanese calendar: Meiji 25 (明治２５年)
- Javanese calendar: 1821–1822
- Julian calendar: Gregorian minus 12 days
- Korean calendar: 4225
- Minguo calendar: 20 before ROC 民前20年
- Nanakshahi calendar: 424
- Thai solar calendar: 2434–2435
- Tibetan calendar: ལྕགས་མོ་ཡོས་ལོ་ (female Iron-Hare); 2018 or 1637 or 865 — to — ཆུ་ཕོ་འབྲུག་ལོ་ (male Water-Dragon); 2019 or 1638 or 866

1892 (MDCCCXCII) was a leap year starting on Friday of the Gregorian calendar and a leap year starting on Wednesday of the Julian calendar, the 1892nd year of the Common Era (CE) and Anno Domini (AD) designations, the 892nd year of the 2nd millennium, the 92nd year of the 19th century, and the 3rd year of the 1890s decade. As of the start of 1892, the Gregorian calendar was 12 days ahead of the Julian calendar, which remained in localized use until 1923.

In Samoa, 1892 had 367 days instead of 366, repeating July 4 twice. This means that the International Date Line was drawn from the east of the country to go west.

== Events ==
=== January ===
- January 1 – Ellis Island begins processing immigrants to the United States.

=== February ===
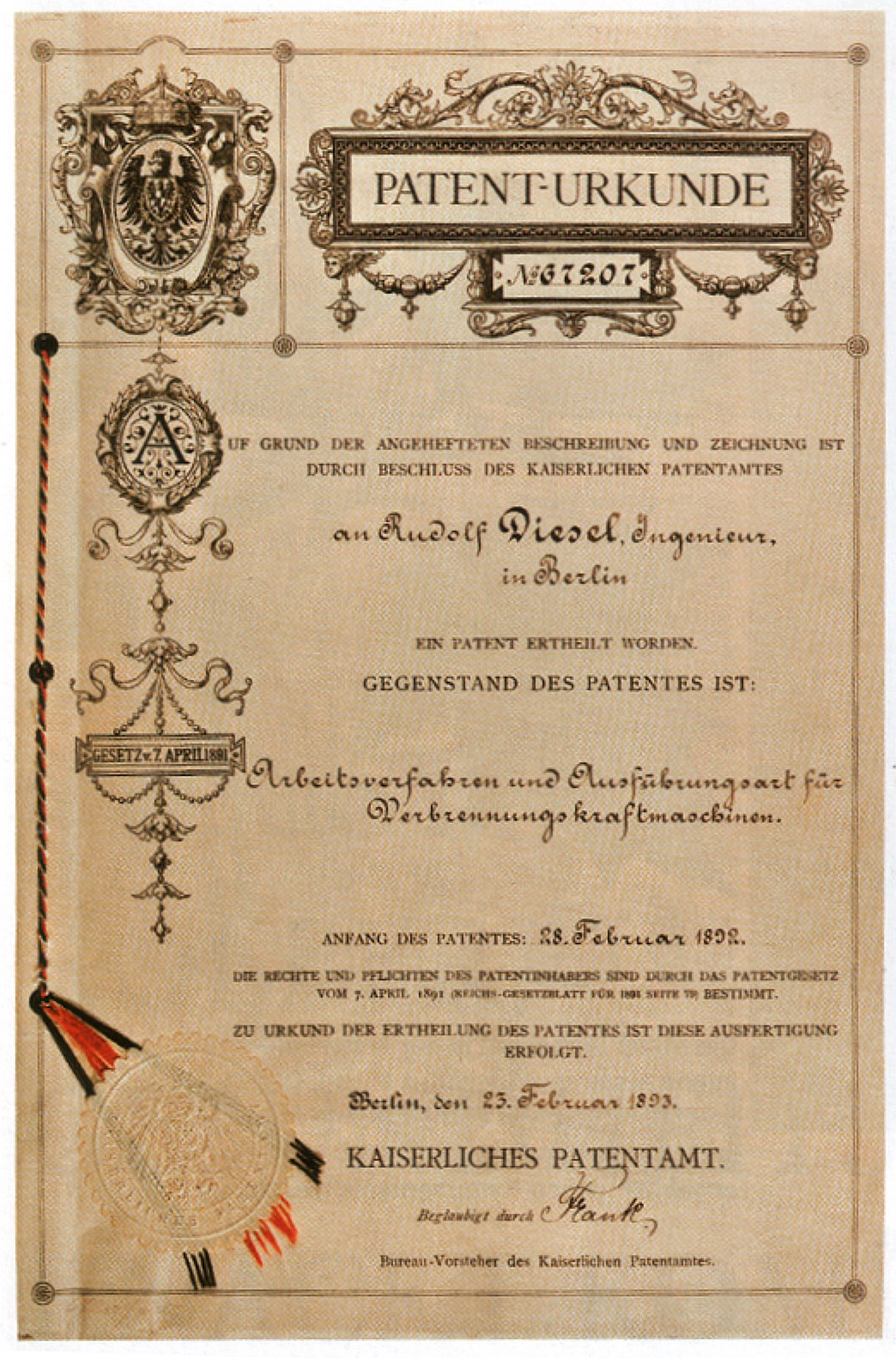
February 27: Rudolf Diesel's patent.

- February 27 – Rudolf Diesel applies for a patent in Germany, on his compression ignition engine (the Diesel engine).
- February 29 – St. Petersburg, Florida is incorporated as a town.

=== March ===
- March 1 – Theodoros Deligiannis ends his term as Prime Minister of Greece and Konstantinos Konstantopoulos takes office.
- March 6–8 – Exclusive Agreement: Rulers of six Trucial States (Abu Dhabi, Dubai, Sharjah, Ajman, Ras al-Khaimah and Umm al-Quwain) and Bahrain sign an agreement, by which they become de facto British protectorates.
- March 11 – The first basketball game is played in public, between students and faculty at the Springfield, Massachusetts, YMCA before 200 spectators. The final score is 5–1 in favor of the students, with the only goal for the faculty being scored by Amos Alonzo Stagg.
- March 13 – Ernest Louis, a grandson of Queen Victoria, becomes Grand Duke of Hesse and the Rhine on the death of his father, Grand Duke Louis IV.
- March 15
  - The Liverpool Football Club is founded in England by John Houlding, the owner of Anfield; Houlding decides to form his own team after Everton leaves Anfield, in an argument over rent.
  - Jesse W. Reno patents the first escalator, installed at Coney Island as a pleasure ride.
- March 17 – The St. Patrick's Day Snowstorm besieges Tennessee with upwards of 26 inches of snow, establishing accumulation records that still stand.
- March 18 – Sir Frederick Stanley, Governor General of Canada, announces his intention to donate the Stanley Cup for ice hockey.
- March 20 – The first ever French rugby championship final takes place in Paris. Pierre de Coubertin referees the match, which Racing Club de France wins 4–3 over Stade Français.
- March 31 – The world's first fingerprinting bureau is formally opened by the Buenos Aires Chief of Police; it has been operating unofficially since the previous year.

=== April ===
- April 15 – The General Electric Company is established through the merger of the Thomson-Houston Electric Company and the Edison General Electric Company.
- April – The Johnson County War breaks out between small farmers and large ranchers in Wyoming.

=== May ===
- May 19 – Battle of Yemoja River: British troops defeat Ijebu infantry in modern-day Nigeria, using a maxim gun.
- May 20 – The last broad gauge train runs from Paddington on the Great Western Railway of England.
- May 22 – The British conquest of Ijebu Ode marks a major extension of colonial power into the Nigerian interior.
- May 24 – Prince George (later George V of the United Kingdom) becomes Duke of York.

=== June ===
- June 3 – Liverpool Football Club officially comes into existence
- June 5 – An oil fire in Oil City, Pennsylvania, United States, kills 130 people.
- June 6 – The Chicago "L" begins operation for the first time with the opening of the Chicago and South Side Rapid Transit Railroad.
- June 7 – Homer Plessy, a mixed-race man, is arrested for deliberately sitting in a whites-only railroad car in Louisiana, leading to the landmark United States Supreme Court decision Plessy v. Ferguson, which legitimizes "separate but equal" racial segregation in the United States.
- June 11 – The Limelight Department, later one of the world's first film studios, is officially established in Melbourne, Australia.
- June 30 – The Homestead Strike begins in Homestead, Pennsylvania, culminating in a battle between striking workers and private security agents on July 6.

=== July ===
- July 4 – Samoa changes its time zone from 4 hours ahead of Japan to being 3 hours behind California, such that it crosses the International Date Line, and Monday, July 4 occurs twice.
- July 4–26 – British general election: The Conservative and Liberal Unionist coalition government loses its majority in the House of Commons, eventually leading to Prime Minister Lord Salisbury's resignation on August 12.
- July 6
  - Dr. José Rizal, Filipino writer, philosopher and political activist, is arrested by Spanish authorities in connection with La Liga Filipina.
  - Homestead Strike: The arrival of a force of 300 Pinkerton detectives from New York and Chicago results in a fight in which about 10 men are killed.
- July 8 – The Great Fire of 1892 devastates the city of St. John's, Newfoundland.
- July 12 – A hidden lake bursts out of a glacier on the side of Mont Blanc, flooding the valley below and killing around 200 villagers and holidaymakers in Saint-Gervais-les-Bains.
- July 13 – The United International Bureau for the Protection of Intellectual Property (UIBPIP or BIRPI) is established in Bern, Switzerland.
- July 16 – Liberian freed slave Martha Ann Ricks meets Queen Victoria.
- July 25 – The Community of the Resurrection, an Anglican religious community for men, is founded by Charles Gore and Walter Frere, initially in Oxford.

=== August ===
- August 4 – The father and stepmother of Lizzie Borden are found murdered in their Fall River, Massachusetts home; she will be acquitted of their murder.
- August 9 – Thomas Edison receives a patent for a two-way telegraph.
- August 15 – Valparaíso, Chile founds its first football team, Santiago Wanderers.
- August 18 – William Ewart Gladstone assumes the U.K. premiership, as head of the Liberal government, with Irish Nationalist Party support.

=== September ===
- September 8 – The Pledge of Allegiance is first recited in the United States.
- September 9 – Amalthea, the fifth moon of Jupiter, is discovered by Edward Emerson Barnard.
- September 15 – Sergei Witte replaces Ivan Vyshnegradsky as Russian finance minister.
- September 22 – The 'Little Pastry Chef', a French police informant among anarchists, is murdered in Saint-Denis.
- September – Women are first admitted to Yale University's graduate school.

=== October ===
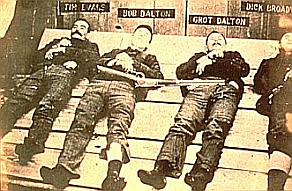
October 5: Dalton Gang.

- October 1 – The University of Chicago holds its first classes.
- October 5
  - The Dalton Gang, attempting to rob two banks in Coffeyville, Kansas, is shot by the townspeople; only Emmett Dalton, with 23 wounds, survives, to spend 14 years in prison.
  - Master criminal Adam Worth is captured in Liège, Belgium, during an attempted robbery of a money delivery cart.
- October 12 – To mark the 400th anniversary Columbus Day holiday, the "Pledge of Allegiance" is first recited in unison by students in U.S. public schools.
- October 30 – The Historical American Exposition opens in Madrid.
- October 31 – The first collection of Arthur Conan Doyle's Sherlock Holmes stories from The Strand Magazine, The Adventures of Sherlock Holmes, is published in London.

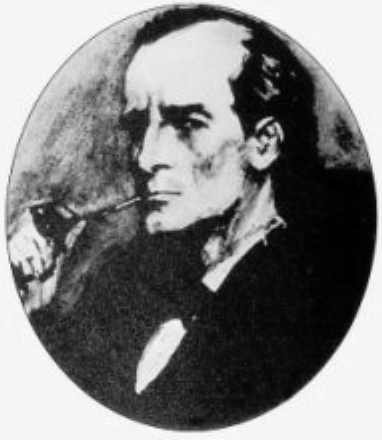
Oct.31: "Sherlock Holmes"

=== November ===
- November 2 – The first football club in Bohemia, Slavia Praha is established, originally under name of Akademický cyklistický odbor Slavia (A.C.O.S.), focusing on cycling.
- November 8
  - 1892 United States presidential election: Grover Cleveland is elected over Benjamin Harrison and James B. Weaver, to win the second of his non-consecutive terms.
  - An anarchist bomb kills six in a police station in Avenue de l'Opéra, Paris.
  - The four-day New Orleans General Strike begins.
- November 17 – French troops occupy Abomey, capital of the kingdom of Dahomey.
- November 24 – The Hotel Zinzendorf catches fire in the city of Winston-Salem, North Carolina; 45 people die.

=== December ===
- December 5 – John Thompson becomes Canada's fourth prime minister.
- December 8 – The various congregations of Trappists leave the Cistercian Order entirely and merge to form a new order with the approval of Pope Leo XIII named the 'Order of Reformed Cistercians of Our Lady of La Trappe', formalising their identity and spirituality as a separate monastic community.
- December 9 – The Newcastle East End F.C. is renamed Newcastle United F.C., following the demise of the Newcastle West End F.C. and East End's move to St James' Park, formerly West End's home, in the north east of England.
- December 17 – First issue of Vogue is published in the United States.
- December 18 – The Nutcracker ballet, with music by Pyotr Ilyich Tchaikovsky, is premiered at the Imperial Mariinsky Theatre in Saint Petersburg, Russia.

=== Date unknown ===
- Diplomat Henry Galway secures a treaty by which Ovonramwen, Oba of Benin, ostensibly accepts British protection for his kingdom.
- A cholera outbreak occurs in Hamburg, Germany.
- A 50-year-old tortoise called Timothy, previously serving as a naval mascot, is brought to the estate of Powderham Castle in England, where she lives until her death in 2004.
- Viruses are first described by Russian biologist Dmitri Ivanovsky.

== Births ==
=== January ===
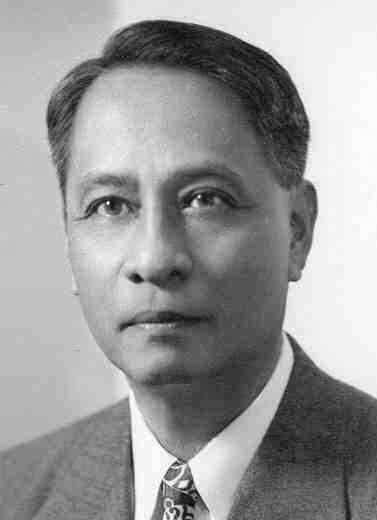
Manuel Roxas

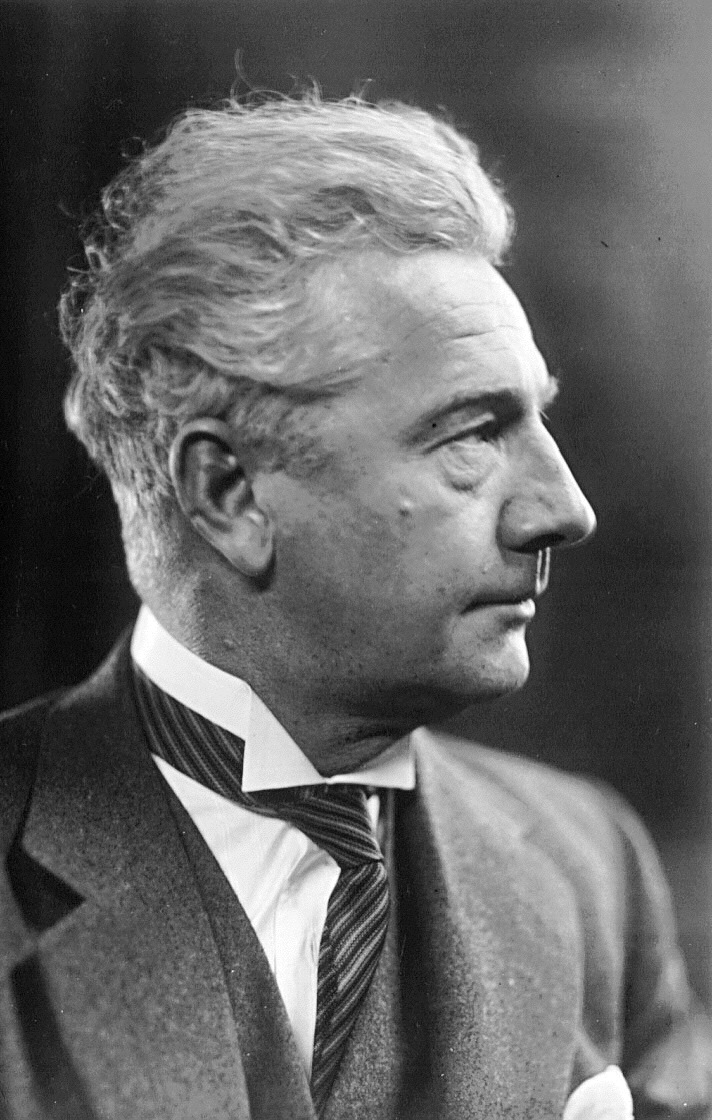
Ólafur Thors

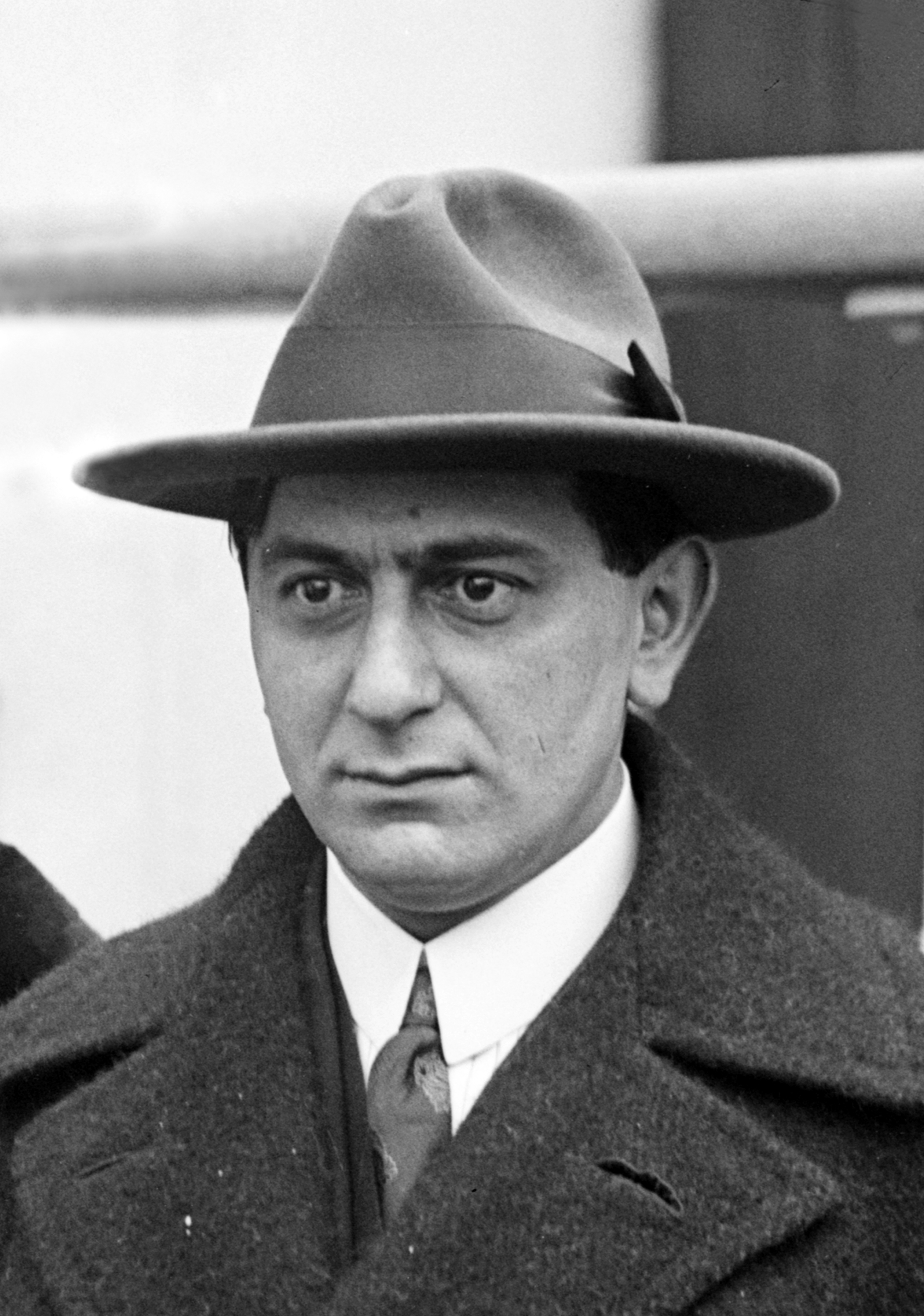
Ernst Lubitsch

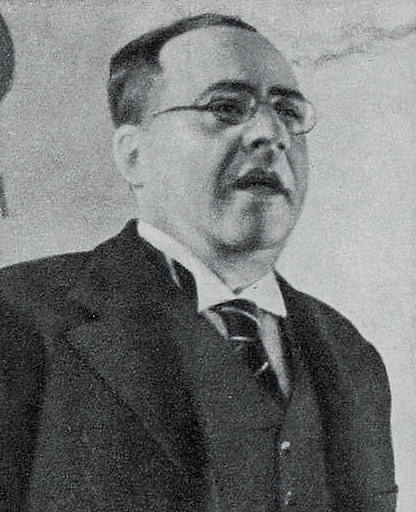
Juan Negrín

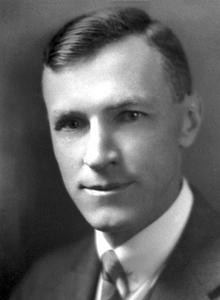
William P. Murphy

- January 1
  - Artur Rodziński, Polish conductor (d. 1958)
  - Manuel Roxas, 5th President of the Philippines (d. 1948)
- January 3 – J. R. R. Tolkien, English professor and writer (d. 1973)
- January 12 – Mikhail Kirponos, Soviet general (d. 1941)
- January 13 – Mohammad-Ali Jamalzadeh, Iranian writer (d. 1997)
- January 14
  - Martin Niemöller, German theologian and prisoner in the Nazi Holocaust (d. 1984)
  - Hal Roach, American film, television producer (d. 1992)
  - Franz Dahlem, German politician (d. 1981)
- January 15
  - Rex Ingram, Irish film director (d. 1950)
  - Hobey Baker, American athlete (d. 1918)
  - William Beaudine, American film director (d. 1970)
- January 18 – Oliver Hardy, American comedian, actor (d. 1957)
- January 19 – Ólafur Thors, Icelandic politician, 5-times prime minister (d. 1964)
- January 22
  - Marcel Dassault, French aircraft industrialist (d. 1986)
  - Bahruz Kangarli, Azerbaijani artist (d. 1922)
- January 25 – Takeo Takagi, Japanese admiral (d. 1944)
- January 26 – Bessie Coleman, American aviator (d. 1926)
- January 28
  - Ernst Lubitsch, German-born film director (d. 1947)
  - Fyodor Raskolnikov, Soviet revolutionary, writer, journalist, naval commander and diplomat (d. 1939)
- January 31 – Eddie Cantor, American actor, singer (d. 1964)

=== February ===
- February 3 – Juan Negrín, Spanish physician, politician and 67th Prime Minister of Spain (d. 1956)
- February 5 – William Bostock, Australian senior army commander (d. 1968)
- February 6 – William P. Murphy, American physician, recipient of the Nobel Prize in Physiology or Medicine (d. 1987)
- February 9 – Peggy Wood, American actress (d. 1978)
- February 10 – Alan Hale Sr., American actor (d. 1950)
- February 13 – Robert H. Jackson, Associate Justice of the Supreme Court of the United States, chief prosecutor at the Nuremberg Trials (d. 1954)
- February 14 – Radola Gajda, Czech commander and politician (d. 1948)
- February 15 – James Forrestal, first United States Secretary of Defense (d. 1949)
- February 18 – Wendell Willkie, U.S. Republican presidential candidate (d. 1944)
- February 21 – Harry Stack Sullivan, American psychiatrist, psychoanalyst (d. 1949)
- February 22
  - Edna St. Vincent Millay, American writer (d. 1950)
  - David Dubinsky, Belarusian-American labor leader and politician (d. 1982)
- February 23 – Kathleen Harrison, English actress (d. 1995)
- February 27 – William Demarest, American actor (d. 1983)
- February 29
  - Augusta Savage, American sculptor (d. 1962)
  - Dietrich von Jagow, German naval officer, politician, SA-Obergruppenführer and diplomat (d. 1945)

=== March ===
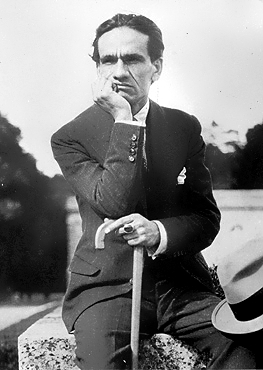
César Vallejo

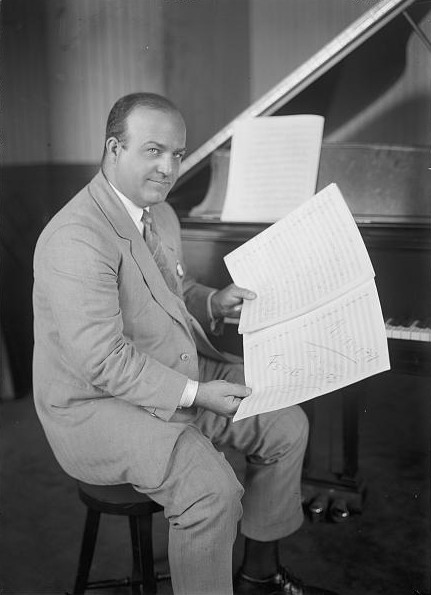
Ferde Grofé

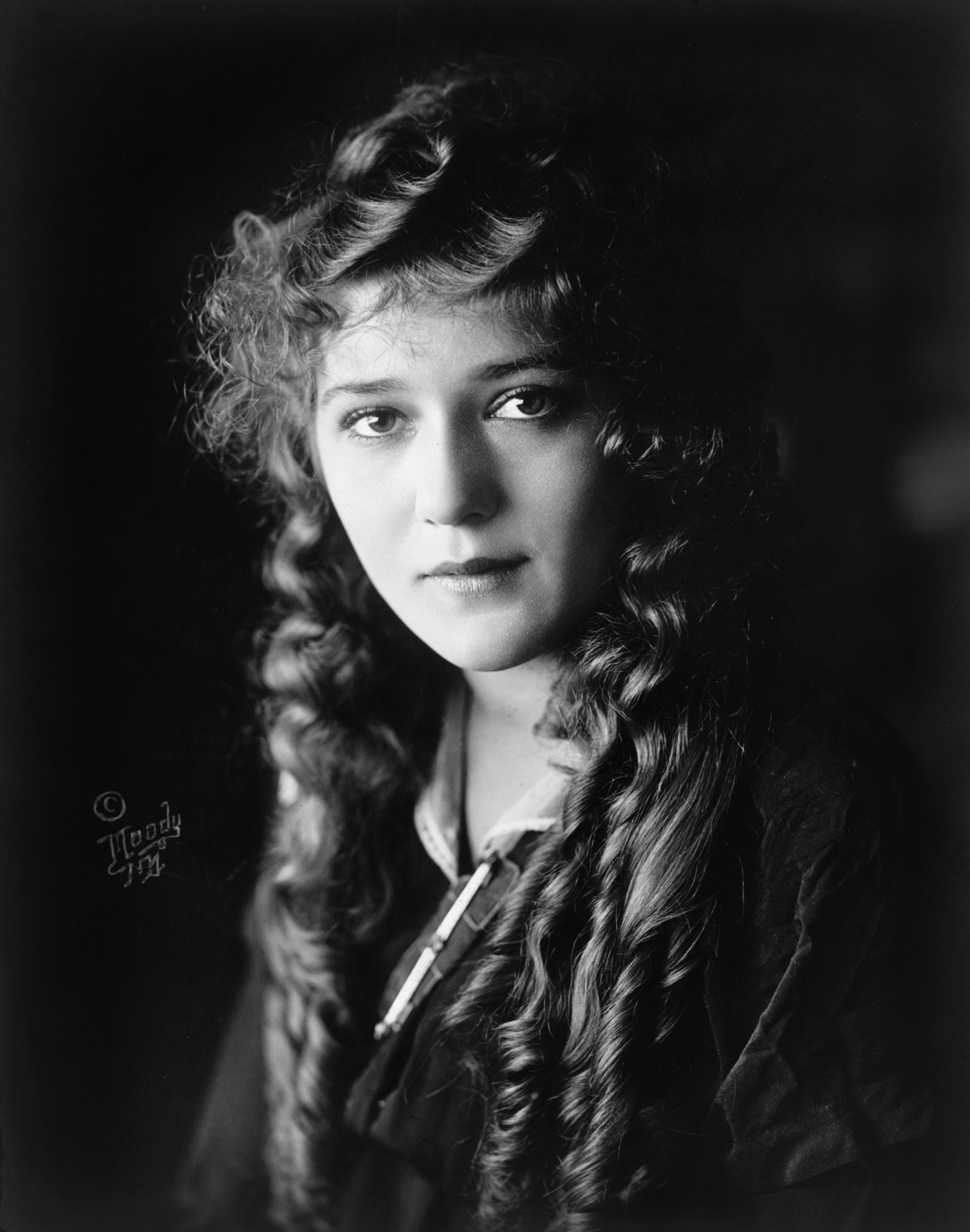
Mary Pickford

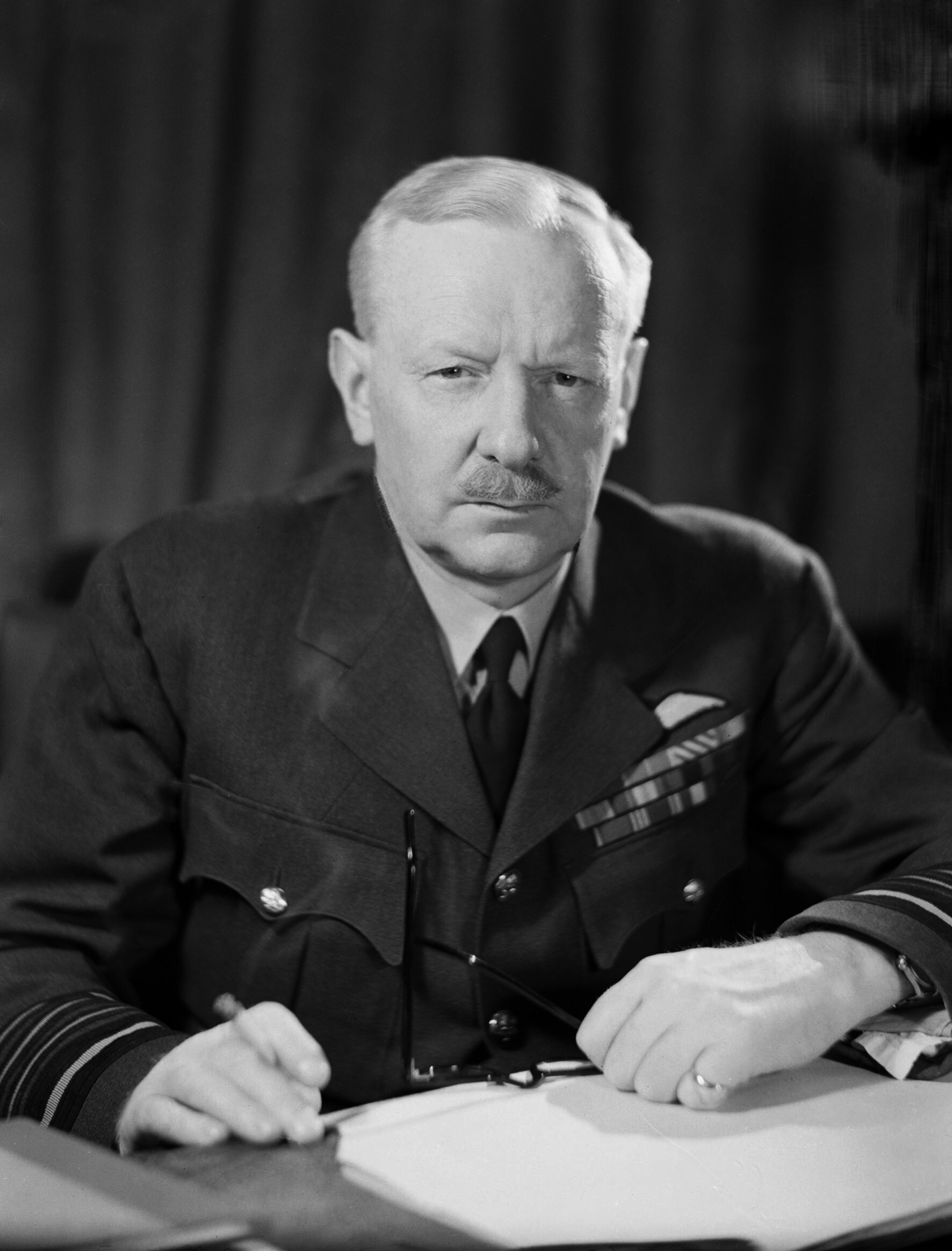
Arthur "Bomber" Harris

- March 1
  - Ryūnosuke Akutagawa, Japanese writer (d. 1927)
  - Mercedes de Acosta, American poet, playwright, costume designer, and socialite (d. 1968)
- March 3 – R. V. C. Bodley, British army officer, author and journalist (d. 1970)
- March 8 – Mississippi John Hurt (some sources give his year of birth as 1893), American country blues singer, guitarist (d. 1966)
- March 9
  - David Garnett, English novelist and writer (d. 1981)
  - Mátyás Rákosi, 43rd prime minister of Hungary (d. 1971)
  - Vita Sackville-West, English writer and gardener (d. 1962)
- March 10
  - Arthur Honegger, French-born Swiss composer (d. 1955)
  - Gregory La Cava, American director, producer and writer (d. 1952)
  - Eva Turner, English operatic soprano (d. 1990)
- March 14 – John Fulton Folinsbee, American painter (d. 1972)
- March 15 – Charles Nungesser, French aviator, World War I fighter ace (d. 1927)
- March 16
  - César Vallejo, Peruvian poet (d. 1938)
  - Abdul Majid Daryabadi, Indian Islamic scholar and philosopher (d. 1977)
  - Gregory Kelly, American actor (d. 1927)
- March 17
  - Sayed Darwish, Egyptian singer and composer (d. 1923)
  - LeRoy P. Hunt, United States Marine Corps general (d. 1968)
- March 21 – Robert S. Beightler, American major general (d. 1978)
- March 25 – Andy Clyde, Scottish-born screen actor (d. 1967)
- March 27 – Ferde Grofé, American pianist, composer (d. 1972)
- March 28
  - Corneille Heymans, Belgian physiologist, Nobel Prize laureate (d. 1968)
  - Tom Maguire, Irish republican (d. 1993)
- March 30
  - Stefan Banach, Polish mathematician (d. 1945)
  - Erhard Milch, German field marshal, Luftwaffe officer (d. 1972)
  - Sanzō Nosaka, Japanese Communist Party chairman and leader of JPEL (d. 1993)
- March 31 – Stanisław Maczek, Polish general (d. 1994)

=== April ===
- April 6
  - Donald Wills Douglas Sr., American industrialist (d. 1981)
  - Lowell Thomas, American journalist (d. 1981)
- April 7 – Julius Hirsch, German footballer (d. 1945)
- April 8 – Mary Pickford, Canadian actress, studio founder (d. 1979)
- April 10 – Victor de Sabata, Italian conductor and composer (d. 1967)
- April 11 – Marguerite Gautier-van Berchem, Swiss archaeologist and art historian (d. 1984)
- April 12
  - Johnny Dodds, American jazz clarinettist (d. 1940)
  - Henry Darger, American outsider artist and writer (d. 1973)
- April 13
  - Sir Arthur Harris, British World War II Royal Air Force commander (d. 1984)
  - Sir Robert Watson-Watt, Scottish inventor of radar (d. 1973)
- April 14 – V. Gordon Childe, Australian archaeologist (d. 1957)
- April 15 – Bessie Smith, American blues singer (d. 1937)
- April 16
  - Dora Richter, German transgender woman and the first known person to undergo complete male-to-female gender-affirming surgery (d. 1966)
  - George Chaney, American boxer (d. 1958)
- April 18
  - Bolesław Bierut, Polish activist and politician (d. 1956)
  - Jack Critchley, Australian politician (d. 1964)
- April 19 – Germaine Tailleferre, French composer (d. 1983)
- April 20 – Caresse Crosby, American inventor of the modern bra and socialite (d. 1970)
- April 24 – Louise Lincoln Kerr, American musician, composer, and philanthropist (d. 1977)
- April 26 – Richard L. Conolly, American admiral (d. 1962)
- April 27 – Raizō Tanaka, Japanese admiral (d. 1969)
- April 28 – Joseph Dunninger, American mentalist (d. 1975)

=== May ===
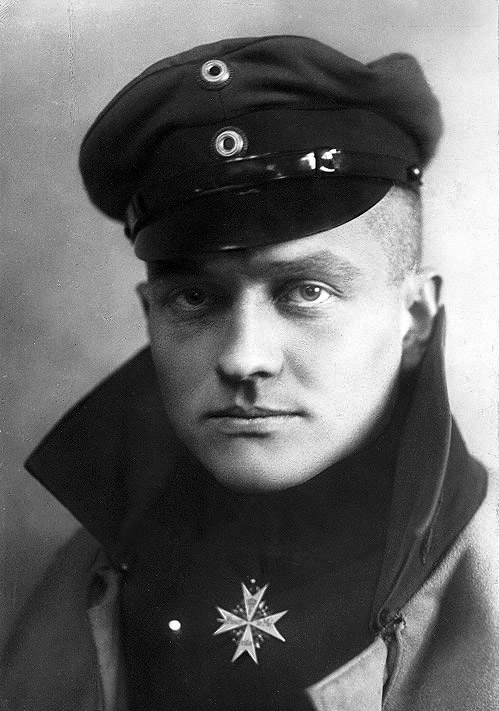
Manfred von Richthofen

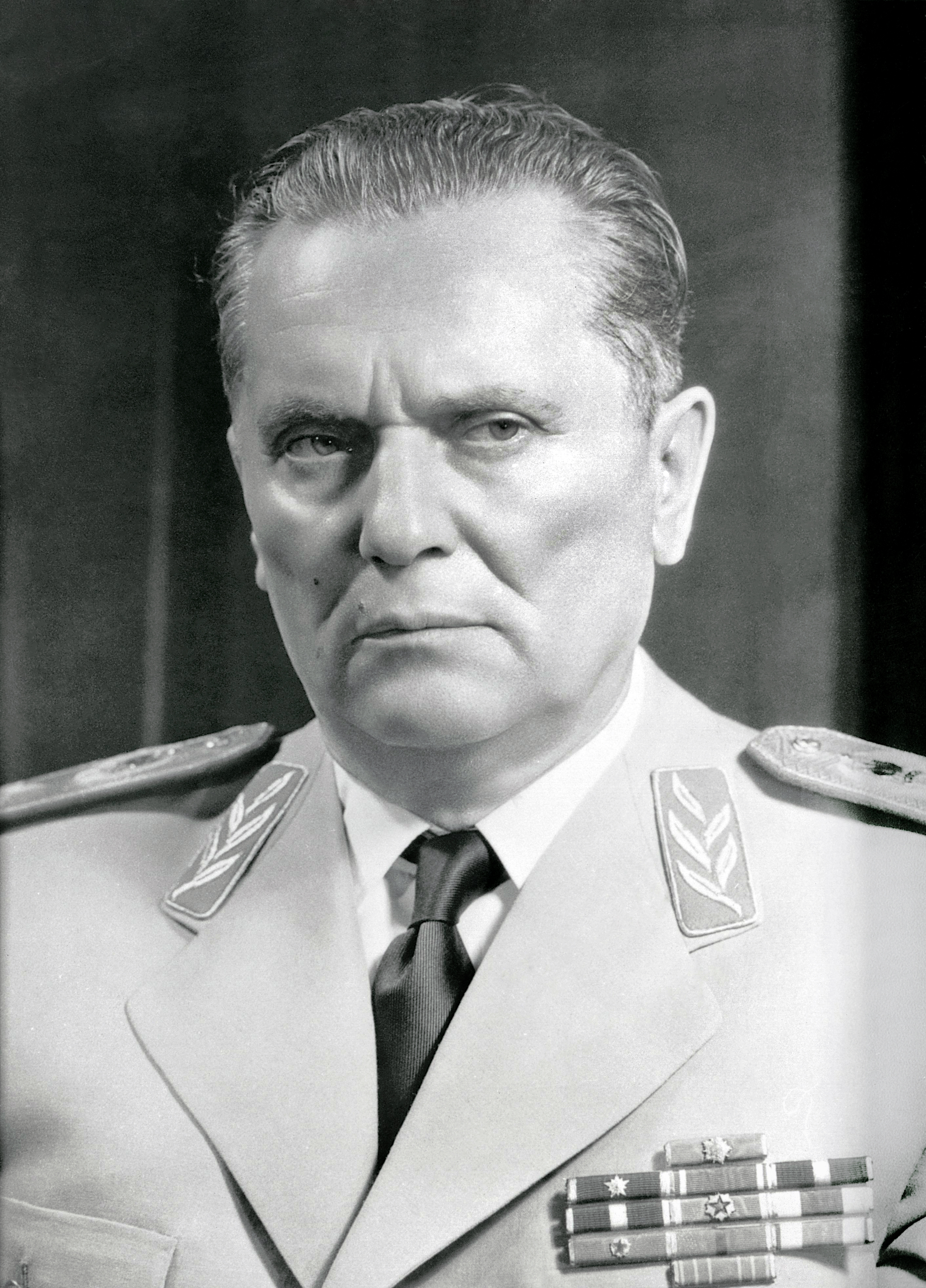
Josip Broz Tito

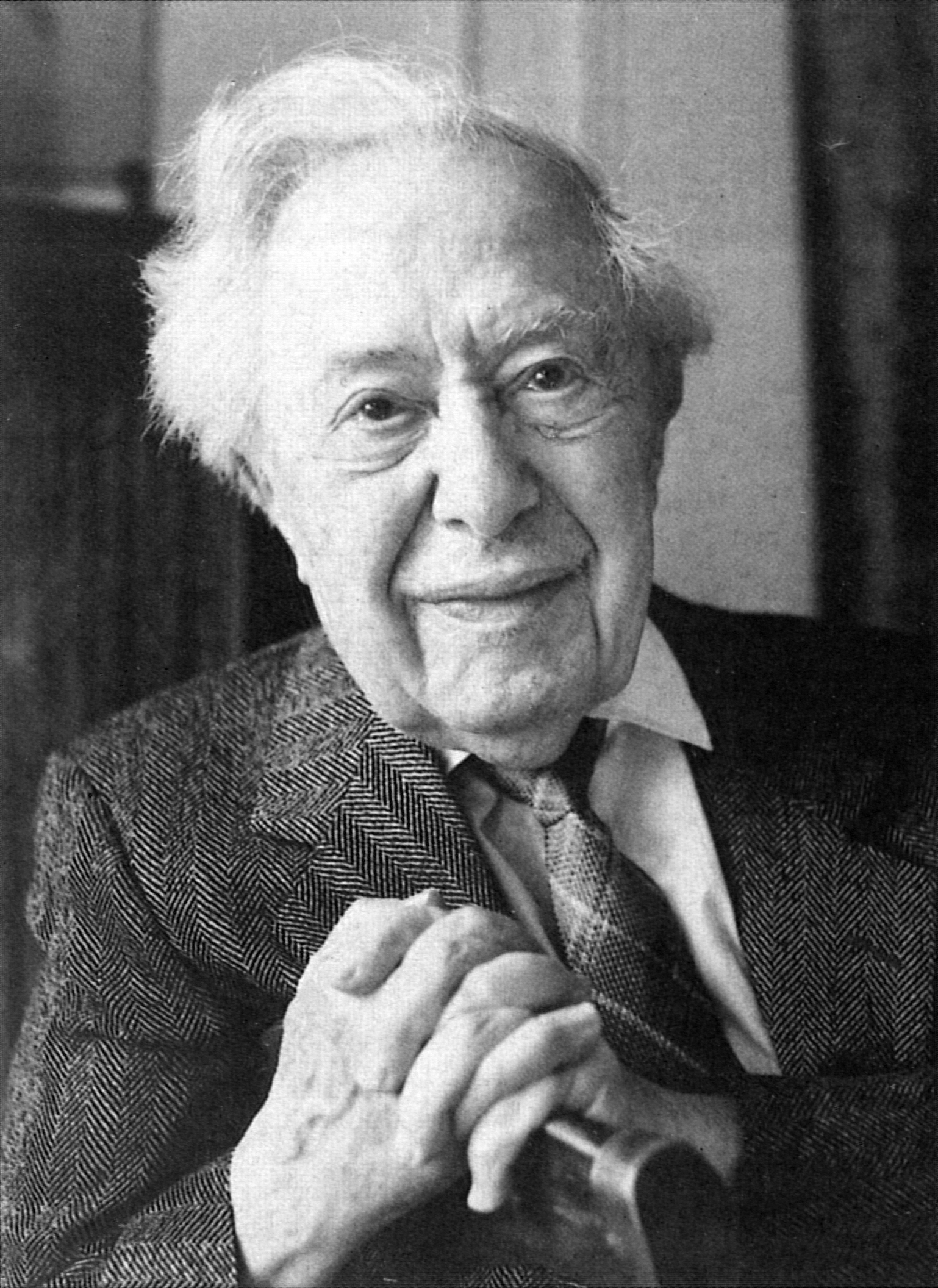
Mieczysław Horszowski

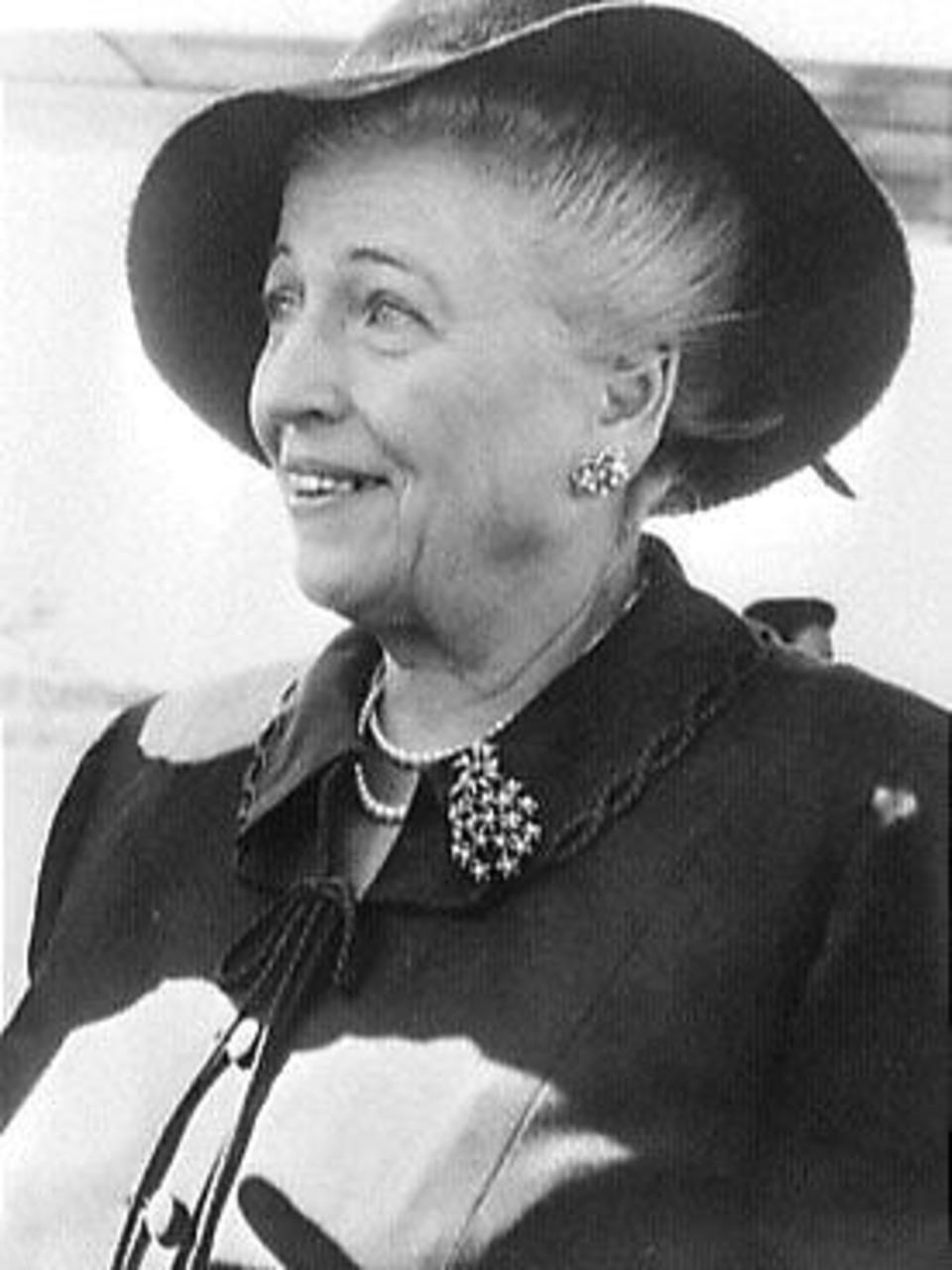
Pearl S. Buck

- May 2 – Manfred von Richthofen (the "Red Baron"), German World War I fighter pilot (d. 1918)
- May 3
  - George Paget Thomson, English physicist, Nobel Prize laureate (d. 1975)
  - Jacob Viner, Canadian economist (d. 1970)
- May 5 – Dorothy Garrod, English archaeologist (d. 1968)
- May 7
  - Archibald MacLeish, American poet (d. 1982)
  - Josip Broz Tito, President of Yugoslavia (d. 1980)
- May 8 – Andrés Córdova, President of Ecuador (d. 1983)
- May 9
  - Zita of Bourbon-Parma, Empress of Austria-Hungary (d. 1989)
  - Ștefan Foriș, Hungarian-Romanian journalist and politician (d. 1946)
- May 11 – Margaret Rutherford, English actress (d. 1972)
- May 12
  - Fritz Kortner, Austrian-born director (d. 1970)
  - Jimmy Wilde, Welsh professional boxer (d. 1969)
- May 15 – Shigeyoshi Miwa, Japanese admiral (d. 1959)
- May 16 – Manton S. Eddy, American general (d. 1962)
- May 18 – Ezio Pinza, Italian bass (d. 1957)
- May 20 – Harry J. Anslinger, first commissioner of the Federal Bureau of Narcotics (d. 1975)
- May 23 – Pichichi, Spanish footballer (d. 1922)
- May 26 – Maxwell Bodenheim, American poet and novelist (k. 1954)
- May 28 – Sepp Dietrich, German Nazi politician, general and war criminal (d. 1966)
- May 29 – Leslie Cubitt Bevis, British sculptor and teacher (d. 1984)
- May 30 – Fernando Amorsolo, Filipino painter (d. 1972)
- May 31 – Gregor Strasser, German Nazi politician (d. 1934)

=== June ===
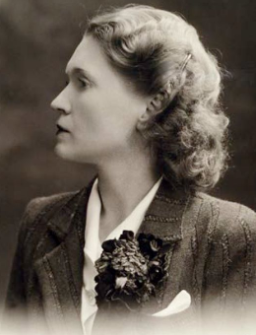
Thérèse Tréfouël

- June 1 – Amānullāh Khān, ruler of Afghanistan (d. 1960)
- June 8 – Nikolai Polikarpov, Soviet aeronautical engineer, aircraft designer (d. 1944)
- June 12 – Djuna Barnes, American artist, illustrator, journalist, and writer (d. 1982)
- June 13
  - Basil Rathbone, British actor (d. 1967)
  - Manuel Nieto, Filipino footballer, businessman, politician, and military official (d. 1980)
- June 16 – Daisy Burrell, British actress (d. 1982)
- June 17 – Thérèse Tréfouël, French chemist known for research on sulfonamides (d. 1978)
- June 21
  - Reinhold Niebuhr, American theologian (d. 1971)
  - Hilding Rosenberg, Swedish composer (d. 1985)
- June 22 – Robert Ritter von Greim, German field marshal (d. 1945)
- June 23 – Mieczysław Horszowski, Polish pianist (d. 1993)
- June 25
  - Katherine Kennicott Davis, American composer (d. 1980)
  - Shirō Ishii, Japanese microbiologist, lieutenant general of Unit 731 (d. 1959)
  - Mongush Buyan-Badyrgy, Tuvan politician and statesman (d. 1932)
- June 26 – Pearl S. Buck, American writer, Nobel Prize laureate (d. 1973)
- June 28
  - Clifford Campbell, Jamaican educator, politician (d. 1991)
  - E. H. Carr, English historian, diplomat, journalist and international relations theorist (d. 1982)
- June 30 – Oswald Pohl, German S.S. officer (d. 1951)

=== July ===
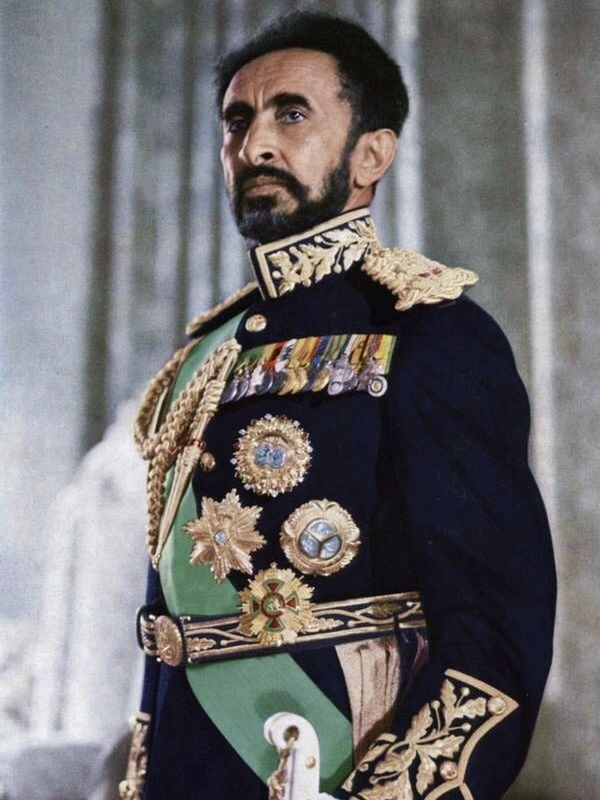
Haile Selassie I

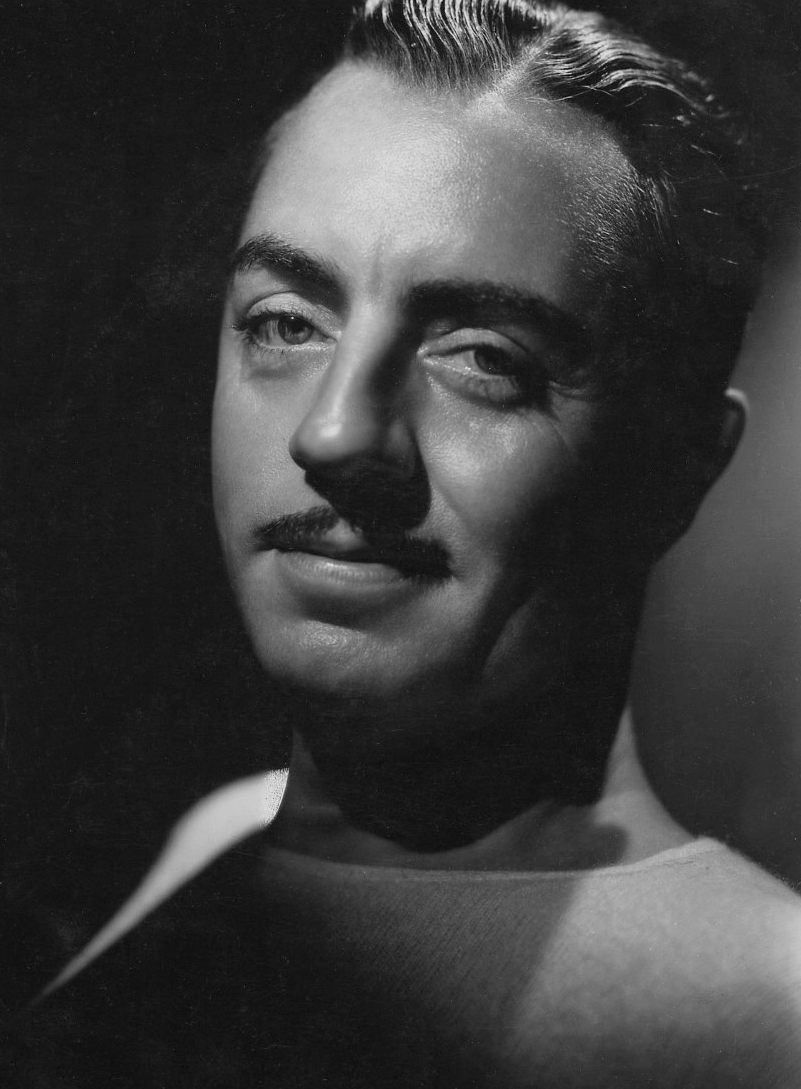
William Powell

- July 1 – James M. Cain, American author and journalist (d. 1977)
- July 2
  - Daniel Mercier, French footballer and soldier (d. 1914)
  - Sweet Evening Breeze, African American drag queen (d. 1983)
- July 4 – A. G. Gaston, American businessman (d. 1996)
- July 6
  - Willy Coppens, Belgian World War I flying ace (d. 1986)
  - John Simpson Kirkpatrick, Australian soldier (d. 1915)
- July 8
  - Richard Aldington, English poet (d. 1962)
  - Dean O'Banion, American gangster (d. 1924)
  - Lester C. Hunt, American politician (d. 1954)
- July 9 – Cromwell Dixon, American pioneer aviator (d. 1911)
- July 11
  - Trafford Leigh-Mallory, British aviator and Royal Air Force Air Chief Marshal (d. 1944)
  - Thomas Mitchell, American actor (d. 1962)
- July 12 – Bruno Schulz, Polish writer and painter (d. 1942)
- July 15
  - Walter Benjamin, German philosopher and cultural critic (suicide 1940)
  - Milena Rudnytska, Ukrainian educator, women's activist, politician and writer (d. 1979)
  - Henry Johnson, African-American Army soldier (d. 1929)
- July 16 – Michel Coiffard, French World War I fighter ace (d. 1918)
- July 21 – Lenore Ulric, American actress (d. 1970)
- July 22 – Arthur Seyss-Inquart, Austrian Nazi politician (d. 1946)
- July 23 – Haile Selassie I, Ethiopian emperor (d. 1975)
- July 24 – Alice Ball, African American chemist (d. 1916)
- July 29 – William Powell, American actor (d. 1984)
- July 31 – Herbert W. Armstrong, American evangelist and founder of the Worldwide Church of God (d. 1986)

=== August ===
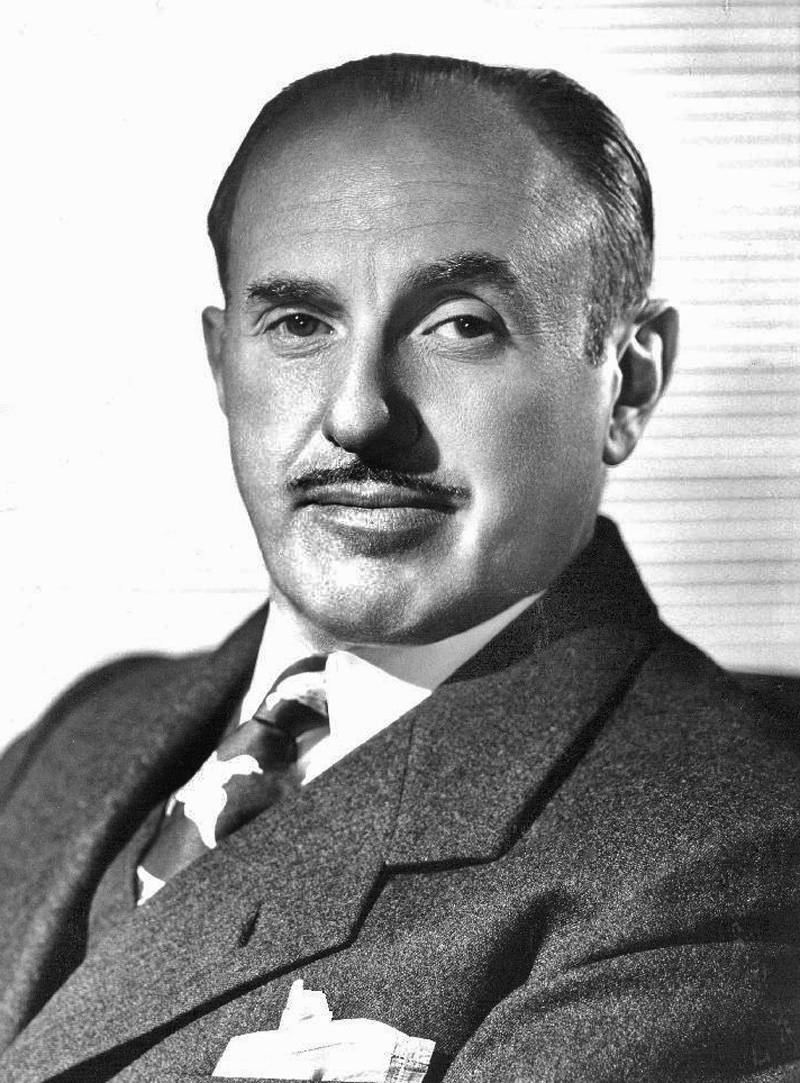
Jack L. Warner

- August 2 – Jack L. Warner, Canadian film producer (d. 1978)
- August 6 – Hoot Gibson, American actor, film director (d. 1962)
- August 7
  - Mohammad Taqi Pessian, Iranian Commander (d. 1921)
- August 11
  - Władysław Anders, Polish general, politician (d. 1970)
  - Hugh MacDiarmid, Scottish poet (d. 1978)
- August 12 – Alfred Lunt, American actor, stage director (d. 1977)
- August 14 – Kaikhosru Shapurji Sorabji, English composer and pianist (d. 1988)
- August 15
  - Louis de Broglie, French physicist, Nobel Prize laureate (d. 1987)
  - Walther Nehring, German general (d. 1983)
- August 17 – Tamon Yamaguchi, Japanese admiral (d. 1942)
- August 20 – George Aiken, American politician and horticulturist (d. 1984)
- August 21 – Charles Vanel, French actor and director (d. 1989)
- August 22 – Percy Fender, English cricketer (d. 1985)
- August 25 – Gabriel Guérin, French World War I fighter ace (d. 1918)
- August 26 – Elizebeth Smith Friedman, American cryptographer (d. 1980)
- August 27 – Helen Gibson, American actress and performer (d. 1977)
- August 29 – Kwan Sung-sing, Chinese construction engineer, architect, and entrepreneur (d. 1960)

=== September ===
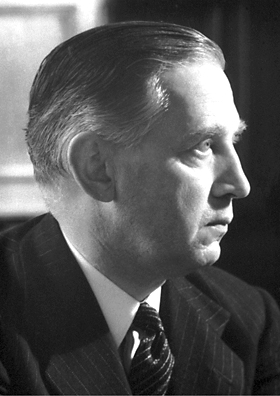
Edward Victor Appleton

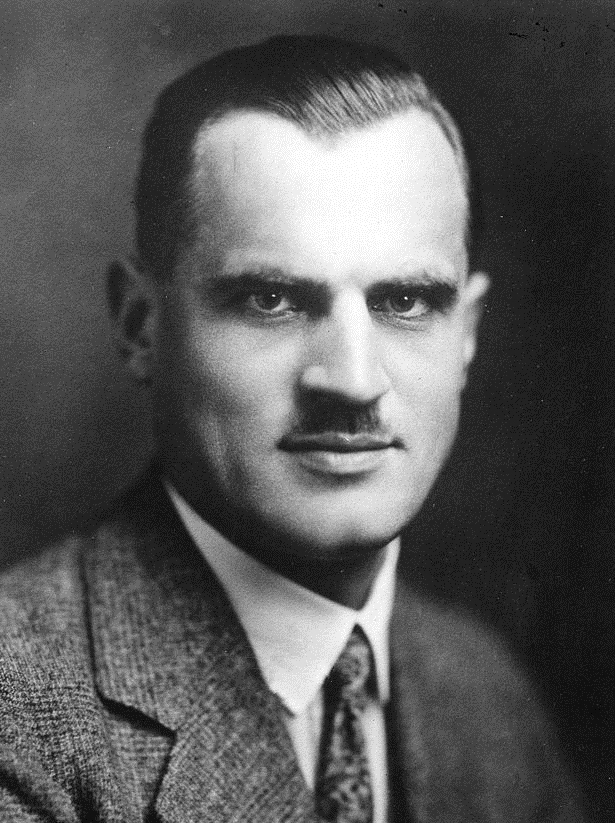
Arthur Compton

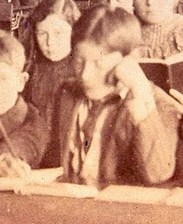
Pinto Colvig

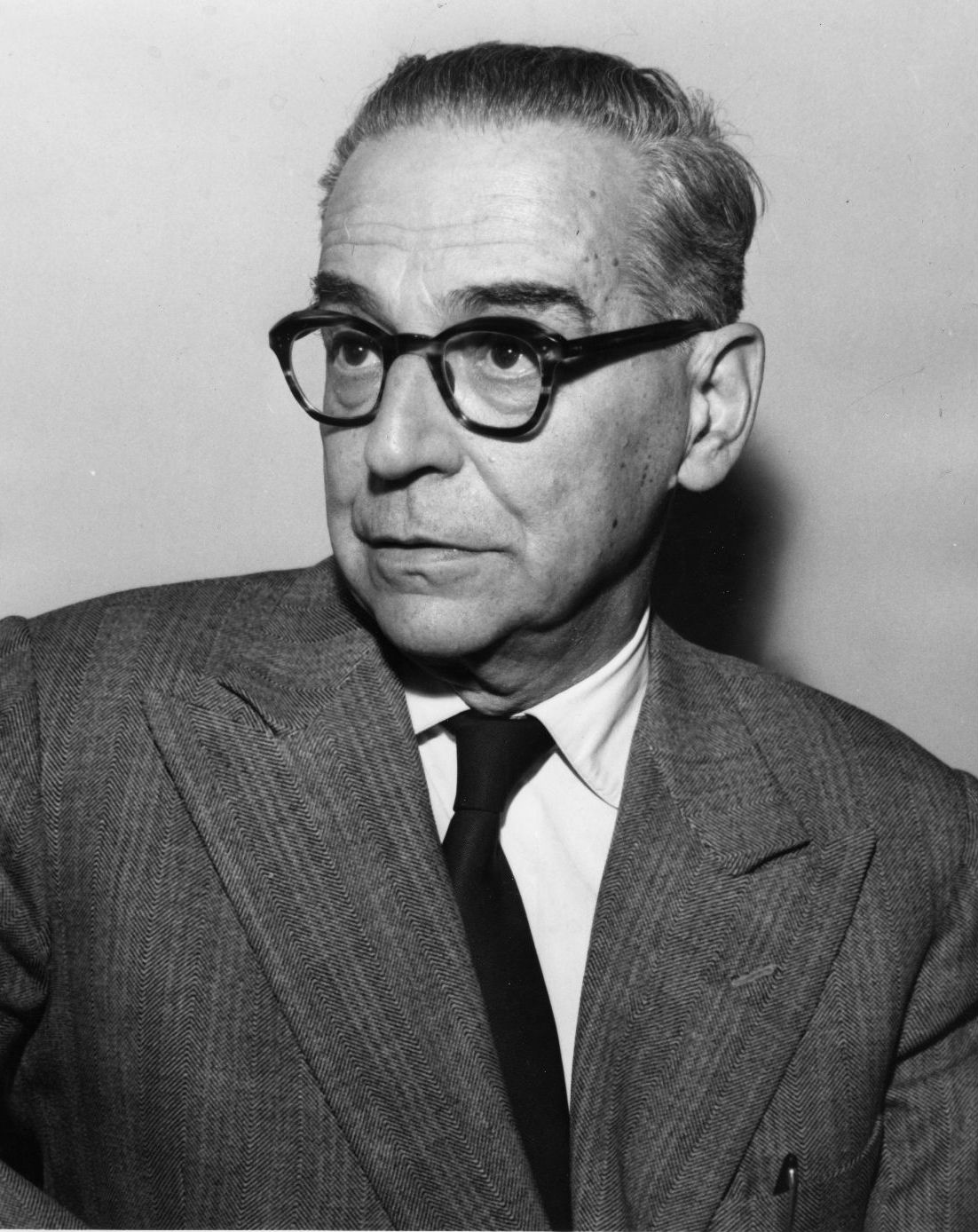
Ivo Andrić

- September 1 – Harold Lamb, American writer, novelist, and historian (d. 1962)
- September 4 – Darius Milhaud, French composer (d. 1974)
- September 5 – Joseph Szigeti, Hungarian violinist (d. 1973)
- September 6 – Edward Victor Appleton, English physicist, Nobel Prize laureate (d. 1965)
- September 9 – Tsuru Aoki, Japanese American actress (d. 1961)
- September 10 – Arthur Compton, American physicist, Nobel Prize laureate (d. 1962)
- September 11 – Pinto Colvig, American vaudeville actor, radio actor, newspaper cartoonist, prolific movie voice actor and circus performer (original voice of Goofy) (d. 1967)
- September 12 – Alfred A. Knopf Sr., American publisher (d. 1984)
- September 13 – Princess Victoria Louise of Prussia, Duchess of Brunswick (d.1980)
- September 20 – Patricia Collinge, Irish-American actress (d. 1974)
- September 24
  - Julia Faye, American actress (d. 1966)
  - Adélard Godbout, Canadian agronomist and politician (d. 1956)

=== October ===
- October 2 – Ilie Crețulescu, Romanian general (d. 1971)
- October 4
  - Engelbert Dollfuss, Austrian statesman, chancellor (d. 1934)
  - Luis Trenker, South Tyrolean film producer, director, writer, actor, architect and alpinist (d. 1990)
- October 7 – Louis C. Fraina, founder of the Communist Party USA (d. 1953)
- October 8 – Marina Tsvetaeva, Russian poet (d. 1941)
- October 9 – Ivo Andrić, Serbo-Croatian writer, Nobel Prize laureate (d. 1975)
- October 14 – Andrei Yeremenko, Soviet military leader, Marshal of the Soviet Union (d. 1970)
- October 16 – Kiyonao Ichiki, Imperial Japanese Army officer (d. 1942)
- October 17
  - R. K. Shanmukham Chetty, Indian jurist, economist (d. 1953)
  - Theodor Eicke, German Nazi and Waffen-SS general (d. 1943)
  - Herbert Howells, English composer, organist, and teacher (d. 1983)
- October 20 – Oliver Goonetilleke, Sri Lankan statesman (d. 1978)
- October 23 – Gummo Marx, American actor, comedian (d. 1977)
- October 25 – Nell Shipman, Canadian actress, writer, and director (d. 1970)
- October 27
  - Graciliano Ramos, Brazilian writer (d. 1953)
  - Charles Ledoux, French wrestler (d. 1967)
- October 29 – Stanisław Ostrowski, President of Poland (d. 1982)
- October 30 – Charles Atlas, Italian-American strongman, sideshow performer (d. 1972)
- October 31 – Alexander Alekhine, Russian chess champion (d. 1946)

=== November ===
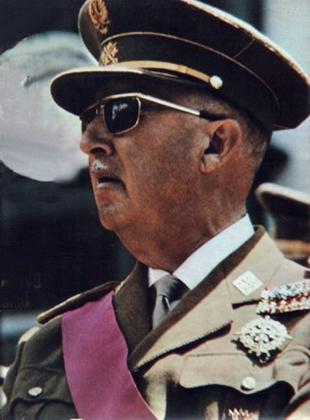
Francisco Franco

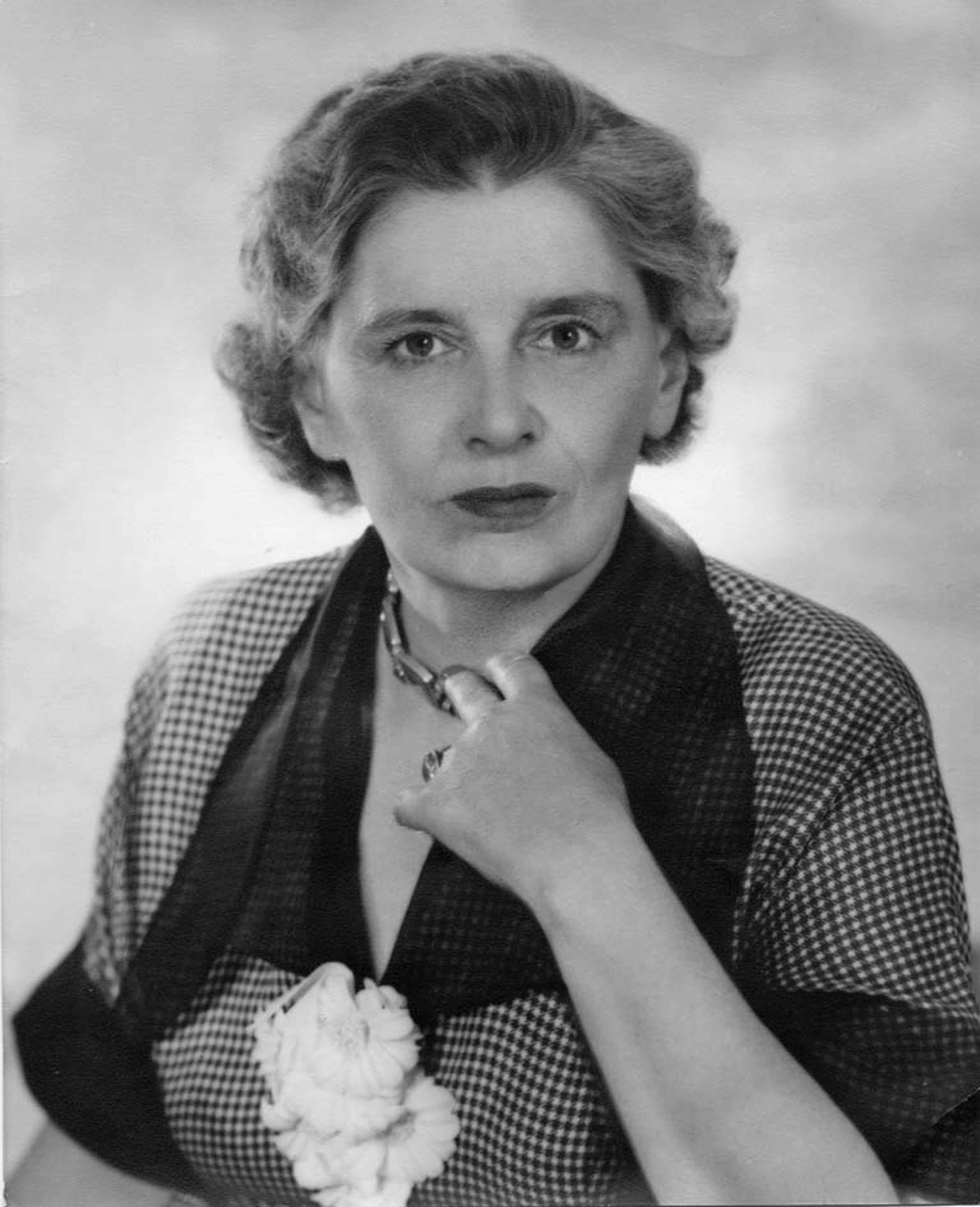
Rebecca West

- November 2 – Alice Brady, American actress (d. 1939)
- November 3 – Maria Antonescu, Romanian socialite and philanthropist (d. 1964)
- November 5 – J. B. S. Haldane, British geneticist (d. 1964)
- November 9 – Erich Auerbach, German philologist (d. 1957)
- November 12 – Guo Moruo, Chinese author, poet (d. 1978)
- November 16
  - Richard Hale, American singer, actor (d. 1981)
  - Tazio Nuvolari, Italian racing driver (d. 1953)
- November 20
  - James Collip, Canadian biochemist (d. 1965)
- November 22 – Emma Tillman, American supercentenarian, briefly the world's oldest living person and last surviving person born in 1892 (d. 2007)
- November 25 – Arthur Blackburn, Australian soldier, lawyer, and politician (d. 1960)

=== December ===
- December 3 – Clarence Kretlow, American politician (d. 1954)
- December 4
  - Francisco Franco, Spanish dictator (d. 1975)
  - Liu Bocheng, Chinese military officer and Marshal(d. 1986)
- December 5 – Cyril Ring, American film actor (d. 1967)
- December 6 – Osbert Sitwell, English writer (d. 1969)
- December 7 – Max Ehrlich, German actor, screenwriter and humor writer (d. 1944 in Auschwitz concentration camp)
- December 8 – Bert Hinkler, Australian aviator (d. 1933)
- December 11 – Arnold Majewski, Finnish military hero of Polish descent (d. 1942)
- December 12
  - Edward Almond, American general (d. 1979)
  - Herman Potočnik, Slovenian rocket engineer (d. 1929)
  - Minnie Evans, African-American artist (d. 1987)
- December 15 – J. Paul Getty, American industrialist (d. 1976)
- December 17 – Sam Barry, American collegiate coach (d. 1950)
- December 21
  - Rebecca West, English author, journalist, literary critic and travel writer (d. 1983)
  - Walter Hagen, American professional golfer (d. 1969)
- December 24
  - Ruth Chatterton, American actress, novelist and aviator (d. 1961)
  - Banarsidas Chaturvedi, Indian writer (d. 1985)
- December 26 – Don Barclay, American actor (d. 1975)
- December 29 – Emory Parnell, American actor (d. 1979)
- December 31 – Stanley Price, American film, television actor (d. 1955)

=== Date unknown ===
- Ahmad Daouk, two-time prime minister of Lebanon (d. 1979)
- Abdallah Khalil, third Prime Minister of Sudan (d. 1970)
- Rashid Ali al-Gaylani, Former Prime Minister of Iraq (d. 1965)

== Deaths ==
=== January–June ===
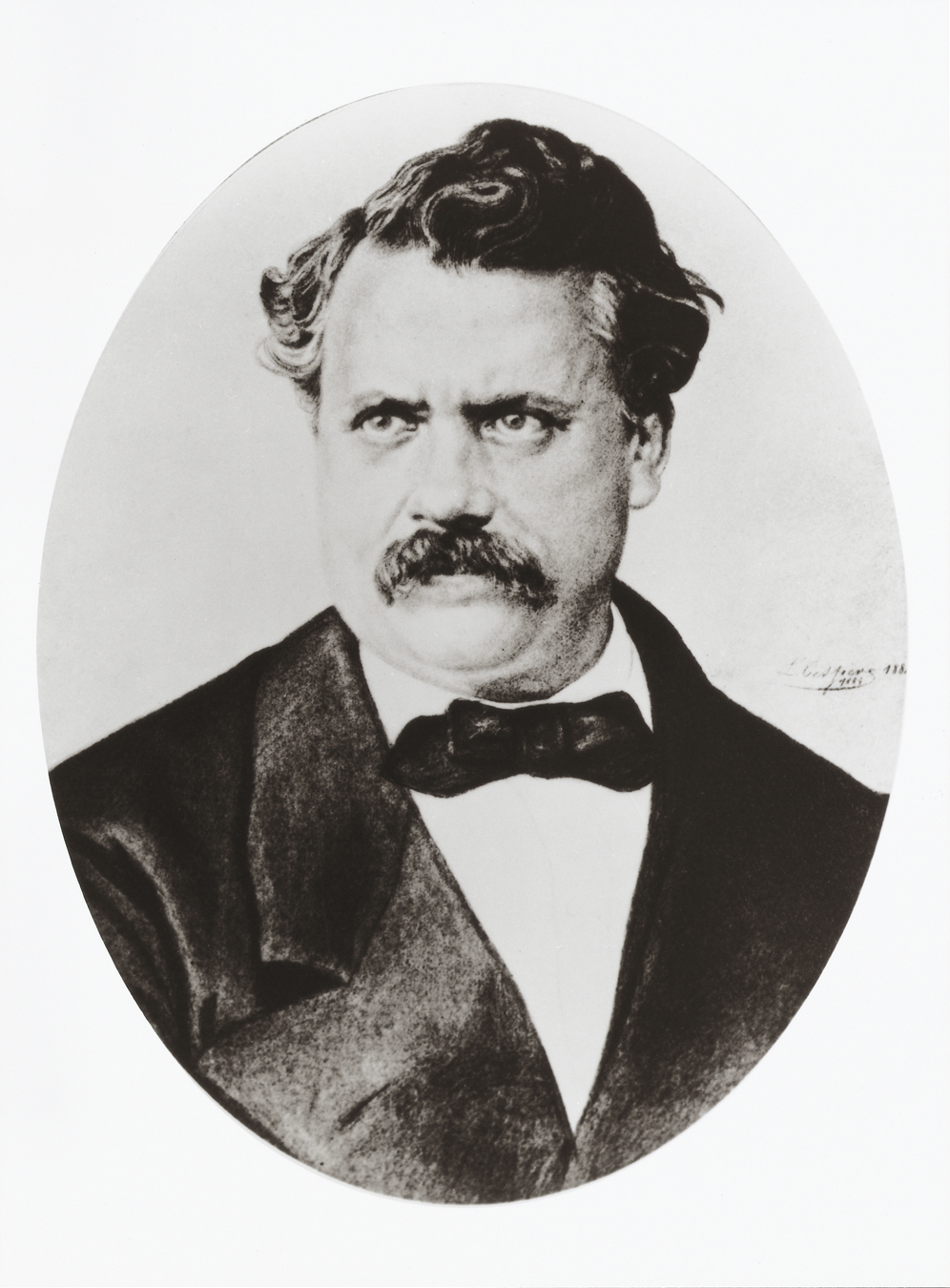
Louis Vuitton

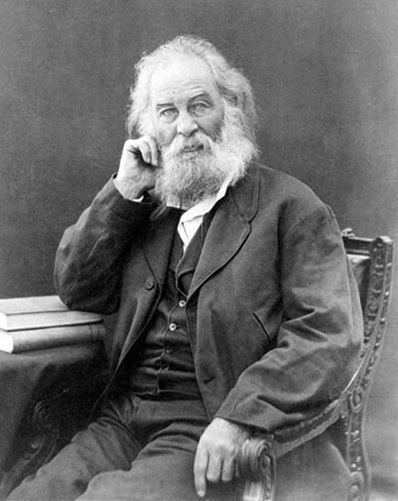
Walt Whitman

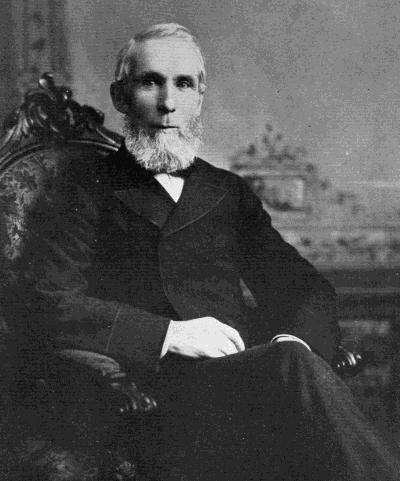
Alexander Mackenzie

- January 2 – Sir George Biddell Airy, English astronomer royal (b. 1801)
- January 7 – Tewfik Pasha, Khedive of Egypt and the Sudan (b. 1852)
- January 7 – Maria Cederschiold, Swedish deaconess (b. 1815)
- January 8 – Christopher Raymond Perry Rodgers, American admiral (b. 1819)
- January 12 – William Reeves, Irish antiquarian (b. 1815)
- January 14 – Prince Albert Victor, Duke of Clarence and Avondale, second in line for the throne of the United Kingdom (b. 1864)
- January 21 – John Couch Adams, English astronomer (b. 1819)
- January 31 – Charles Spurgeon, English preacher (b. 1834)
- February 2 – Darinka Petrovic, princess consort of Montenegro (b. 1838)
- February 5 – Emilie Flygare-Carlén, Swedish novelist (b. 1807)
- February 7 – Andrew Bryson, American admiral (b. 1822)
- February 25 – Charlotte Norberg, Swedish ballerina (b. 1824)
- February 27 – Louis Vuitton, French fashion designer (b. 1821)
- March 5 – Edmond Jurien de La Gravière, French admiral, naval historian and biographer (b. 1812)
- March 13 – Louis IV, Grand Duke of Hesse (b. 1837)
- March 16 – Samuel F. Miller, American politician (b. 1827)
- March 26 – Walt Whitman, American poet (b. 1819)
- March 28 – Emily Lucas Blackall, American author and philanthropist (b. 1832)
- April 4 – José María Castro Madriz, President of Costa Rica (b. 1818)
- April 12 – Ogarita Booth Henderson, American stage actress, daughter of John Wilkes Booth (b. 1859)
- April 17 – Alexander Mackenzie, 2nd Prime Minister of Canada (b. 1822)
- April 19 – Fr. Thomas Pelham Dale SSC, Anglo-Catholic clergyman prosecuted for Ritualist practices in the 1870s (b. 1821)
- April 21 – Emelie Tracy Y. Swett, American author (b. 1863)
- April 22 – Édouard Lalo, French composer (b. 1823)
- April 25 – William Backhouse Astor Jr., American businessman (b. 1830)
- April 26 – Sir Provo William Parry Wallis, British admiral, naval hero (b. 1791)
- May 5 – August Wilhelm von Hofmann, German chemist (b. 1818)
- May 8 – Gábor Baross, Hungarian statesman (b. 1848)
- May 22 – Alexander Campbell, Canadian politician (b. 1822)
- May 29 – Bahá'u'lláh, Persian founder of the Bahá'í Faith (b. 1817)
- May 30 – Mary H. Gray Clarke, American correspondent (b. 1835)
- June 8
  - Dimitrie Brătianu, 15th prime minister of Romania (b. 1818)
  - Robert Ford, American assassin of Jesse James (b. 1862)
- June 9
  - William Grant Stairs, Canadian explorer (b. 1863)
  - Yoshitoshi, Japanese artist (b. 1839)
- June 28 – Sir Harry Atkinson, 10th Premier of New Zealand (b. 1831)

=== July–December ===
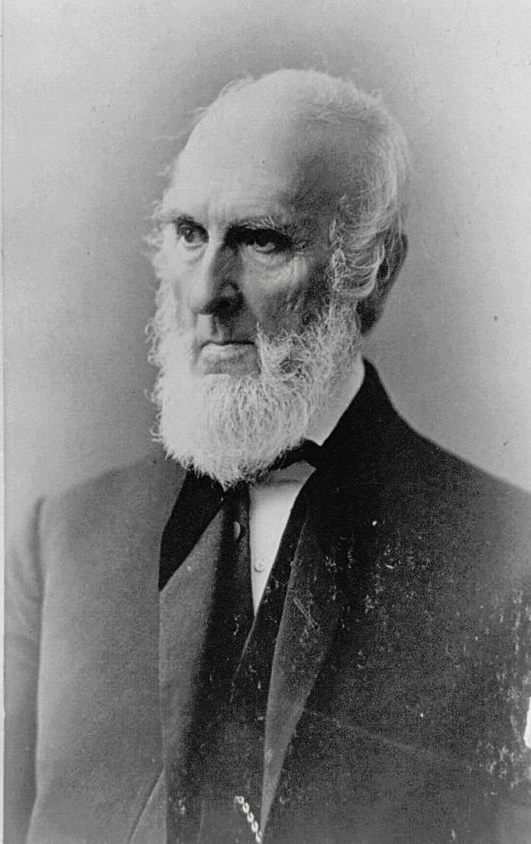
John Greenleaf Whittier

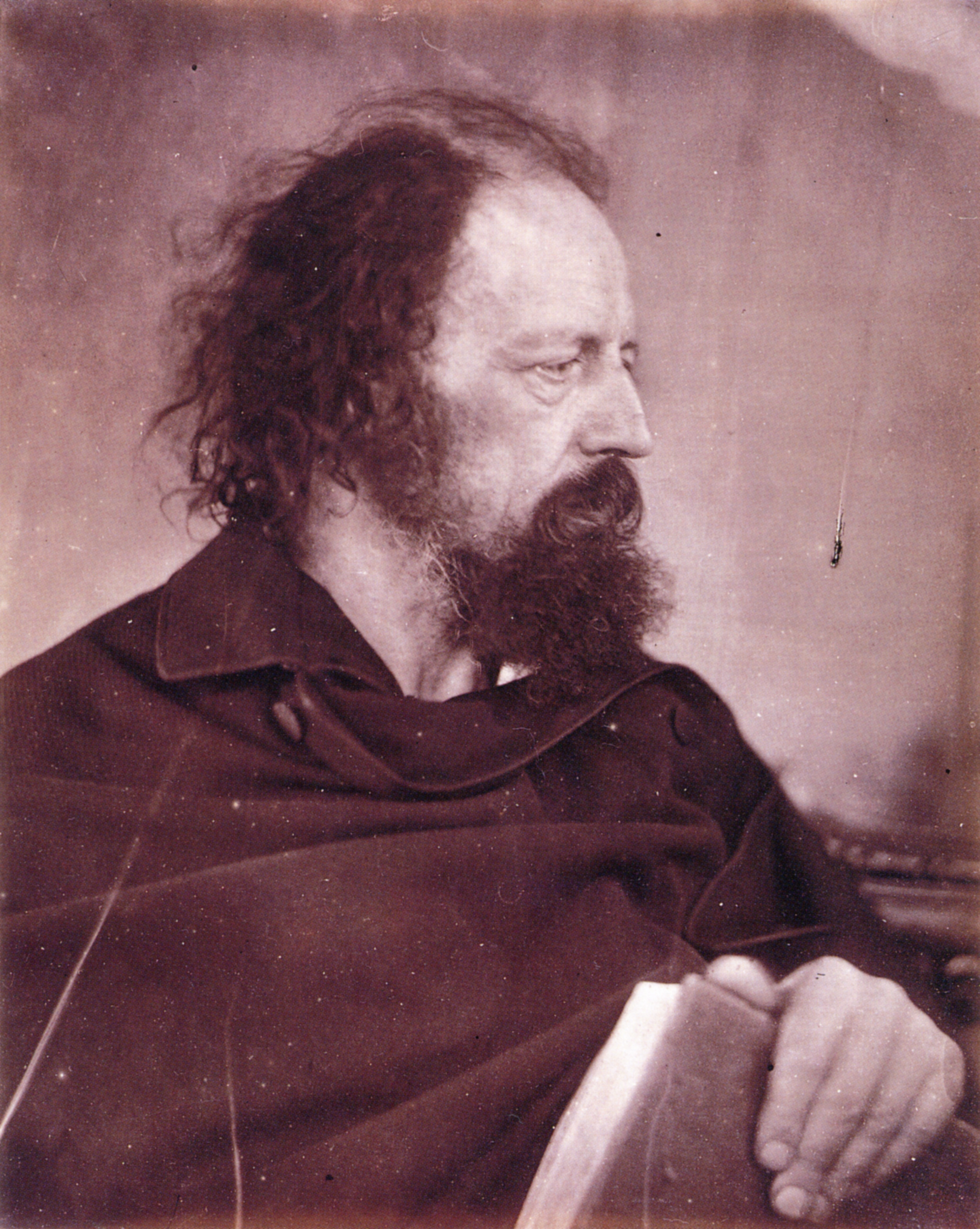
Alfred, Lord Tennyson

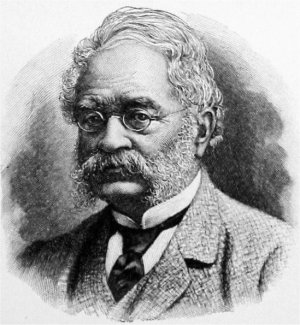
Werner von Siemens

- July 11 – Ravachol, French illegalist anarchist (b. 1859)
- July 17 – Carlo Cafiero, Italian anarchist and leader of the Italian section of the International Workingmen's Association (b. 1846)
- July 18 – Rose Terry Cooke, American author (b. 1827)
- July 30 – Count Joseph Alexander Hübner, Austrian diplomat (b. 1811)
- August 4 – Ernestine Rose, Polish-born feminist (b. 1810)
- August 13 – Charles Lafontaine, Swiss mesmerist (b. 1803)
- August 23 – Deodoro da Fonseca, 1st president of Brazil (b. 1827)
- September 6 – Betty Bentley Beaumont, British merchant (b. 1828)
- September 7 – John Greenleaf Whittier, American poet, abolitionist (b. 1807)
- September 8 – Louisa Jane Hall, American literary critic (b. 1802)
- September 11 – Clarissa Caldwell Lathrop, American social reformer (b. 1847)
- September 12 – John Cummings Howell, United States Navy admiral (b. 1819)
- October 2 – Ernest Renan, French philosopher, philologist, historian and writer (b. 1823)
- October 5 – Bob Dalton, American Wild Western outlaw (b. 1869)
- October 6
  - Alfred, Lord Tennyson, English poet laureate (b. 1809)
  - Jean-Antoine Villemin, French physician (b. 1827)
- October 23
  - Abdyl Frashëri, Albanian politician (b. 1839)
  - Emin Pasha, Ottoman-German doctor, Governor of Equatoria (b. 1840)
- October 24 – Mir-Fatah-Agha, Persian Shiite cleric
- October 25 – Caroline Harrison, First Lady of the United States (b. 1832)
- November 15 – Thomas Neill Cream, Scottish-Canadian serial killer (b. 1850)
- December – Eudora Stone Bumstead, American poet (b. 1860)
- December 1 – Mary Allen West, American superintendent of schools (b. 1837)
- December 2 – Jay Gould, American financier (b. 1836)
- December 6 – Werner von Siemens, German inventor, industrialist (b. 1816)
- December 11 – Nancy Edberg, Swedish pioneer of women's swimming (b. 1832)
- December 14 – Sir Adams Archibald, Canadian lawyer and politician (b. 1814)
- December 18
  - John M. Lloyd, American bricklayer and police officer (b. 1835)
  - Sir Richard Owen, English paleontologist (b. 1804)
