= Izola Forrester =

American writer

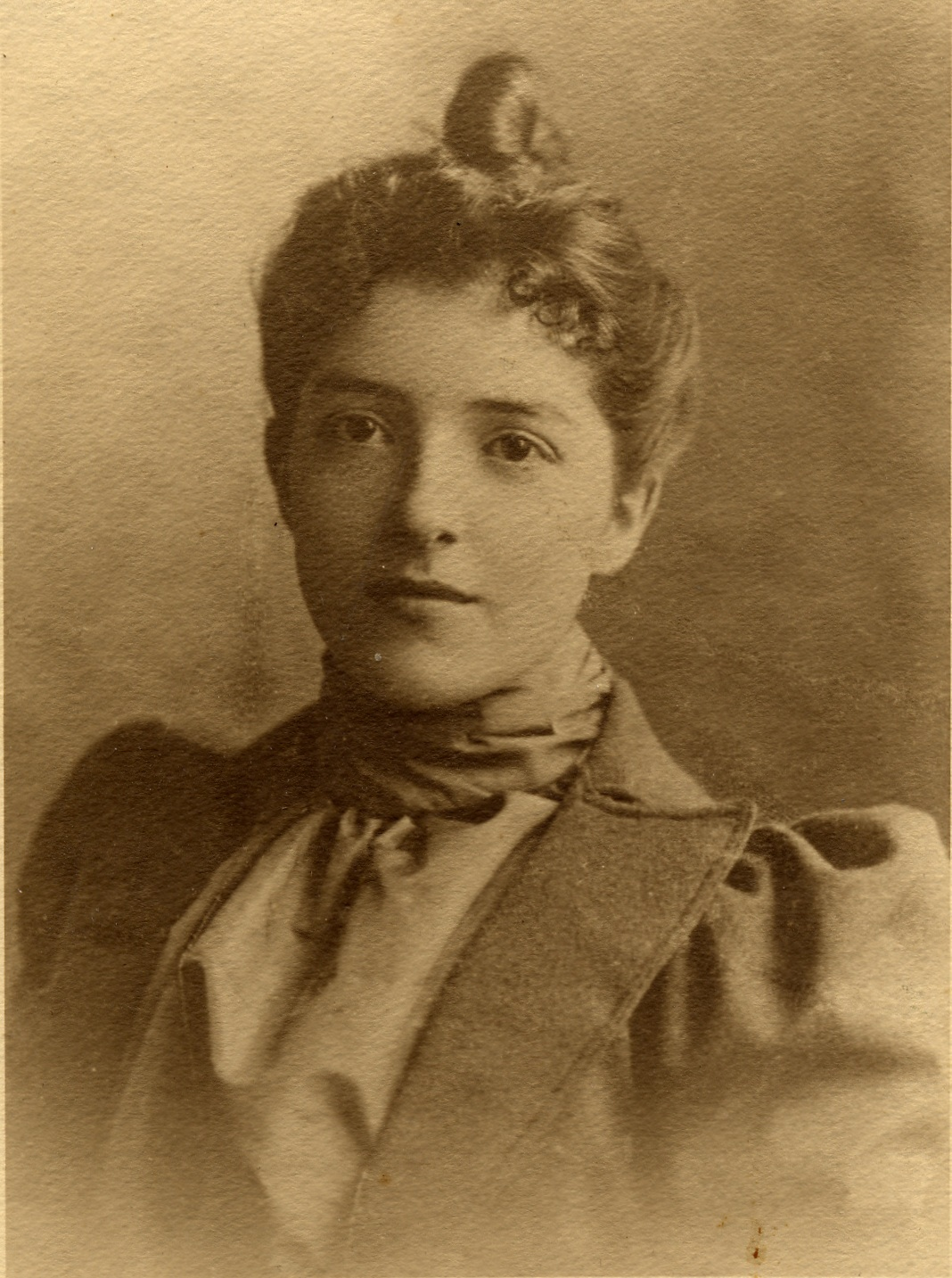
Izola Forrester, 1898.

Izola Forrester (November 15, 1878 – March 6, 1944) was an American author who was born Izola Louise Wallingford.

Forrester was a pioneer journalist in the heyday of magazine and newspaper publishing in the early part of the 20th century. She was also one of the early women screenwriters of silent films, drawing on her books and stories for their plots, as well as the dramas she was familiar with as a child performer in the 1880s, trouping with her mother Ogarita Booth Henderson (Oct. 23, 1859 – April 12, 1892). Ogarita was a stage actress who believed herself to be the daughter of John Wilkes Booth.

== Biography ==
Forrester's father was George Wallingford Hills (Nov. 9, 1853 – Feb. 22, 1923), a Harvard-educated travel writer, but she was brought up by a stepfather, Alexander Henderson, a director of light operas, and later by newspaperman George Forrester and his wife Harriet, who formally adopted her on January 6, 1893, after her mother's death. Izola had one sister, Beatrice Henderson Colony, also a child actress, who became a vaudeville performer, a radio host, and the founder-producer of the Keene Summer Theater in New Hampshire.

Forrester's career as a writer and editor began at the age of 15 in Chicago, where she met banner artist Ruben Robert Merrifield (Sept. 21, 1860 – April 13, 1932). They married on October 29, 1899, in Chicago. She was hired as a feature writer for the New York World, specializing in women's interest stories about public figures, from the leaders of the suffrage movement to the stars of stage and film. She was a regular contributor to many periodicals such as The Saturday Evening Post and McClure's under Managing Editor Willa Cather, as well as the author of over twenty books including the popular Greenacre Girls and Polly Page fiction series. During the period 1907–14, she contributed numerous stories to the pulp magazines, including The Ocean, its successor The Live Wire, and The All-Story.

Forrester's body of work propelled her into a career as a screenwriter in Hollywood with her second husband, playwright Mann Page Jr. (May 29, 1888 – March 15, 1961). Izola and Mann were married (a common law marriage) on Nov. 18, 1913. Their 36 films ranged from the silent era's The Quitter (1915) starring Lionel Barrymore, collaborations with Douglas Fairbanks and Sinclair Lewis, Rent Free (1922) with Wallace Reid to the talkies' She Had to Choose (1934) starring Buster Crabbe.

An embodiment of the post-Victorian independent woman, Forrester pursued her professional career both by choice and economic necessity, managing to balance it with motherhood and the raising of eight children born between 1901 and 1918.

Forrester's last book was This One Mad Act: The Unknown Story of John Wilkes Booth and His Family by His Granddaughter (1937), a memoir of her childhood recollections of her mother's and grandmother's connection with John Wilkes Booth.
