= Theatre Comique (disambiguation) =

The Theatre Comique was a Broadway theater in New York demolished in 1881. New Theatre Comique was a different Broadway theater that burned down in 1884.

Theatre Comique may also refer to:

- Theatre Comique (Jersey City, New Jersey) in Jersey City, New Jersey
- Theatre Comique (Boston)
- Theatre Comique (Providence, Rhode Island), a theater that featured Ogarita Booth Henderson
