= New York Evening Telegram =

Defunct newspaper from New York City

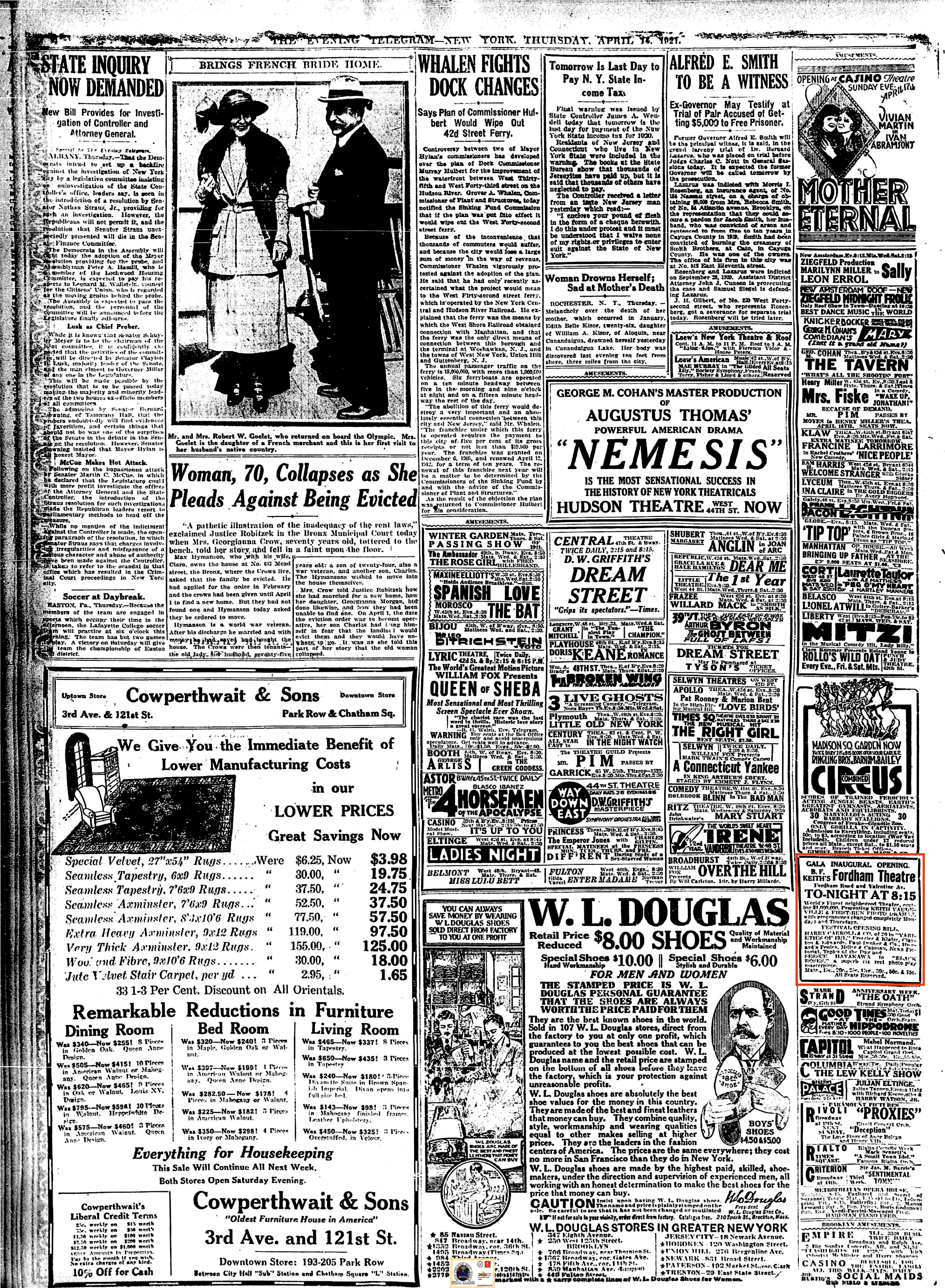
- Page 4 of Evening Telegram on 14 April 1921
- Publisher: James Gordon Bennett Jr.
- Founded: 1867
- Ceased publication: 1924 (Merged with New York Evening Mail)
- Language: English
- City: New York City
- Country: United States

The New York Evening Telegram was a New York City daily newspaper. It was established in 1867. The newspaper was published by James Gordon Bennett Jr., and it was said to be considered to be an evening edition of the New York Herald.

Frank Munsey acquired the Telegram in 1920, which ceased its connection to the Herald. It merged into the New York Evening Mail in 1924. Eventually, it was merged into the New York World-Telegram.
