= Mohican Stores =

Chain of American grocery stores

The Mohican Stores were a chain of grocery stores, founded by Frank Munsey in 1897 in New London, Connecticut. By 1935 there were about seventy-five stores across the northeastern US. They were among the earliest to run as cash and carry stores, and were very profitable for Munsey.

On September 1, 1897, the New London Day carried the announcement of the plan to use the Munsey Building in New London for a department store. The store opened in early November.

When Munsey died in 1925, the stores were acquired, along with many of Munsey's other business interests, for about $13,000,000, by William Dewart, who had worked for Munsey.

In 1956 the 25 Mohican Stores in New England merged with the Kelley stores in Connecticut. At that time there were another 32 Mohican Stores still in business outside New England.

== Sources ==
- Anonymous (September 1, 1897). "Department Stores". The Day. New London, Connecticut. p. 5.
- Anonymous (October 28, 1897). "New Store Opening". The Day. New London, Connecticut. p. 5.
- Anonymous (November 9, 1897). "Big Crowd at New Store". The Day. New London, Connecticut. p. 6.
- Anonymous (October 2, 1926). "Dewart Buys Sun, Telegram and Stores for $13,000,000". The Fourth Estate. p. 15.
- Anonymous (March 12, 1956). "Mohican, Kelley Food Chains In New England to be Merged". The Journal. Meriden, Connecticut. p. 16.
- Britt, George (1972) [1935]. Forty Years—Forty Millions. Port Washington, New York: Kennikat Press. ISBN 0-8046-1513-6.
