= Frank Munsey =

American publisher and politician (1854–1925)

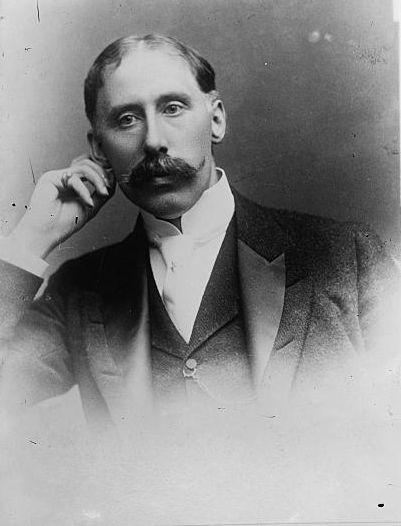
- Munsey in 1910
- Born: Frank Andrew Munsey; August 21, 1854; Mercer, Maine, U.S.
- Died: December 22, 1925 (aged 71); New York City, U.S.
- Occupations: Publisher, author

Frank Andrew Munsey (August 21, 1854 – December 22, 1925) was an American newspaper and magazine publisher, banker, political financier and author. He was born in Mercer, Maine, but spent most of his life in New York City. The village of Munsey Park, New York, is named for him, along with The Munsey Building in downtown Baltimore, Maryland, at the southeast corner of North Calvert and East Fayette Streets.

Munsey is credited with using new, high-speed printing presses, supplied with inexpensive, untrimmed, pulp paper, to mass-produce magazines at significantly reduced costs. Each issue could be priced as low as 10 cents; less than half the lowest price then charged for similar publications. Munsey's publishing presented diverse genres, preferring fictional, action-adventure storytelling. His magazines were aimed at working-class readers who could neither afford, nor expect to read about people like themselves in, the 25-cent "slick" magazines of the time.

Munsey's pulp magazine innovation spawned a new line of publishing, one in which he was well positioned to profit, and from which he did become wealthy. If one of his magazine titles was no longer profitable, Munsey would stop his presses just long enough to typeset/promote one of many titles continuously being field-tested. New titles can expand revenue or replace what has been lost when demand for an older title is much reduced.

== Early life ==
Frank Munsey was born on August 21, 1854, on a farm a couple of miles from Mercer, Maine. His father, Andrew Chauncey Munsey, was a Civil War veteran who had been born in Quebec; his mother was Mary Jane Merrit Hopkins Munsey. The family moved around Maine several times: first to Gardiner, six months after he was born; then three years later to Bowdoin. They stayed in Bowdoin until 1868, then moved to Lisbon Falls, and again in about 1878 to Livermore Falls. Frank had three older sisters, and a younger sister and brother.

Frank worked at a grocery store in Lisbon Falls, and since the store included the local Post Office he was able to teach himself to use the telegraph. At age sixteen he moved to Portland as the telegraph operator for a hotel, and after jobs in Rye Beach, Boston and elsewhere he returned to Maine, where he was hired by Western Union in about 1877 to manage their branch office in Augusta. As Augusta is the state capital of Maine, Munsey had an opportunity to meet local politicians, and he made the acquaintance of James Blaine, one of Maine's senators. Augusta was also the center of a major part of the American magazine publishing industry, and among other local businessmen Munsey met Edward Charles Allen, who had founded People's Literary Companion in 1870 and become very successful in the business.

== The Golden Argosy and Munsey's Magazine ==
Munsey became determined to publish a magazine, and having saved $500 and persuaded two acquaintances to invest $3,500 ($117,000 in 2025), he spent his $500 on acquiring manuscripts, and left Augusta for New York in 1882. There he discovered that the cost estimates he had made were unrealistically low. He simplified the plans for the new magazine and wrote to the main investor for the funds, but received no reply. He was forced to give up the idea of launching the magazine himself as he had only $40 in hand along with the manuscripts he had bought. He persuaded E. G. Rideout, a New York publisher, to take on the magazine, with Munsey as editor and manager. The first issue, titled The Golden Argosy, was dated December 9, 1882. Rideout went bankrupt in early 1883, but Munsey was able to claim the magazine's title and subscription list in lieu of unpaid salary, and the magazine continued with Munsey as publisher. In 1884 Blaine was the Republican candidate for President, and Munsey proposed to start a magazine, Munsey's Illustrated Weekly, to carry campaign news. The magazine ceased publication after the election but its apparently official nature helped Munsey get credit for paper and other supplies. Munsey later said, "That debt made me. Before, I had no credit and had to live from hand to mouth. But when I owed $8,000 my creditors didn't dare drop me. They saw their only chance of getting anything was to keep me going."

An advertising campaign in 1887 put Munsey $95,000 in debt, but made The Golden Argosy profitable, and boosted circulation to 115,000 in May of that year. The improvement was temporary; Munsey later realized that magazines for children were uninteresting to advertisers as children had no buying power, and the subscriptions dropped as the children grew up. He shortened the title to just The Argosy in 1888, and experimented with changing the page size and page count, but made no headway. In 1889 he launched a second magazine, Munsey's Weekly, and in 1891 he tried his hand at running a newspaper, taking over the Daily Continent, but giving it up after only four months. At the end of the year he converted the weekly to a monthly, titled Munsey's Magazine, priced at 20 cents, and in October 1893 he cut the price to 10 cents. He had to struggle to distribute it at this price, since the American News Company had a monopoly on magazine distribution and only offered him four cents a copy from his 164 page magazine, the same price they were paying for 32 page dime novels. Munsey decided that he could handle his own primary distribution, bypassing American News, and generate more profit in the process. By the February issue Munsey was printing 200,000 copies, and it soon became successful enough to guarantee his financial security. The Argosy's circulation had dropped to 9,000 by March 1894, but jumped to 40,000 when Munsey converted it to monthly publication the following month. In 1896 he changed it to carry only fiction, and began printing it on cheap wood-pulp paper, making it the first pulp magazine. Circulation grew again, reaching 300,000 in 1902, and half a million in 1907.

By 1895, circulation of Munsey's Magazine was over half a million copies per month, reaching 700,000 by 1897. In October 1906, Munsey began publishing Railroad Man's Magazine, the first specialized pulp magazine which featured railroad-related stories and articles. This was soon followed by a similar magazine, The Ocean, which featured sea stories and articles. The Ocean debuted with a March 1907 issue. After the January 1908 issue, The Ocean's title was changed to The Live Wire and its content became more general purpose. Other Munsey pulps and magazines included Puritan, Junior Munsey, All-Story Magazine, Scrap Book, Cavalier, Railroad and Current Mechanics.

== Newspapers ==
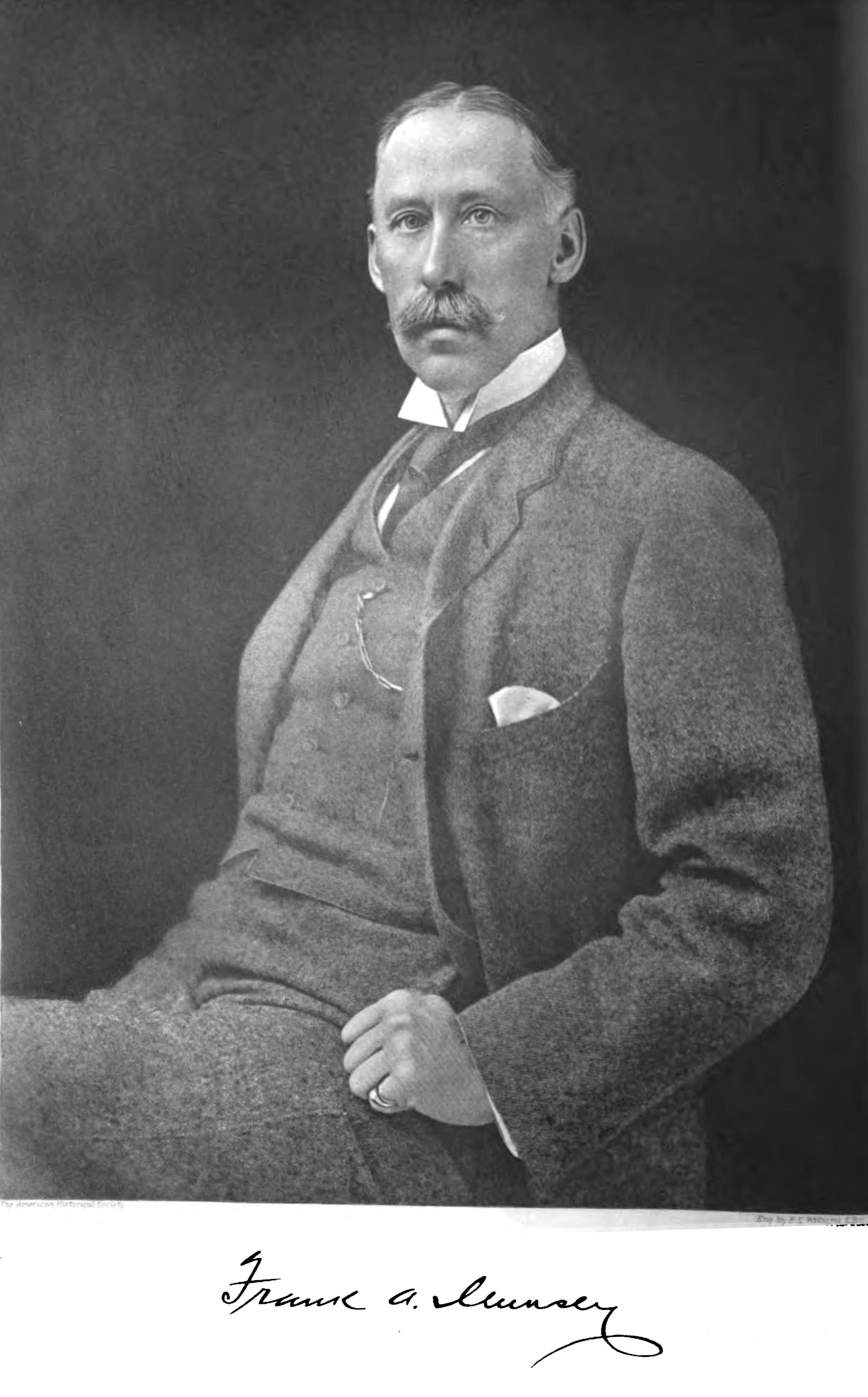
Frank Munsey c. 1919

Once he became interested in newspapers, Munsey's visibility increased, both locally and nationally. Over a 24-year period he bought, operated and/or sold as many as 17 papers. During a period in which the total number of American newspapers was in decline, Munsey became known for merging many of his properties. Though perhaps wise financially, his mergers earned him a great deal of enmity from those who worked in the industry. He would be referred to at various times as "Executioner of Newspapers", the "Dealer in Dailies" and the "Undertaker of Journalism."

Newspapers with a period of Munsey ownership:

- Washington Times – founded 1894 by Rep. Charles G. Conn (1844–1931) of Elkhart, Indiana; later publisher Stilson Hutchins (1838–1912), the previous founder/owner of The Washington Post, 1877–1889. Purchased by Munsey in 1901, sold to Hearst in 1917, merged with Washington Herald in 1922, as Washington Times-Herald, acquired by Eleanor Josephine Medill Patterson ("Cissy" Patterson; 1881–1948) of Medill-McCormick-Patterson publishing families in 1939, and held until her death. Merged with The Washington Post in 1954. Times-Herald name remained on Post masthead until 1973 (not related to the later The Washington Times, published since 1982 by a subsidiary of the Unification Church and Rev. Sun Myung Moon, 1920–2012).
- New York Daily News – operated 1901–1904. Not the same Daily News founded 1919 by Joseph Medill Patterson (1879–1946) of the Medill-McCormick-Patterson publishing families.
- The Boston Journal (1902; sold to Matthew Hale on March 10, 1913).
- Baltimore News-American composed of Baltimore American [Sundays], (founded 1773), sold to Hearst by Gen. Felix Agnus, owner/publisher, 1923, and The News [week-days], founded 1873, acquired February 27, 1908, from owner/editor Charles H. Grasty (who bought it in 1892, who later became co-owner/editor of competitor Baltimore Sun), The News was also sold to Hearst in 1923. Later merged with the Baltimore Post of Scripps-Howard and both merged 1964. Closed in 1986 having been published 113 years.
- Philadelphia Evening Times (discontinued in 1914).
- New York Herald – bought in 1920 along with the Paris Herald and the New York Evening Telegram, later the New York World-Telegram for four million dollars. Sold in 1924 to Ogden Mills Reid, (grandson of elder Whitelaw, son of Whitelaw Reid (journalist)) who merged it with his own New York Tribune, founded in 1841 by Horace Greeley (1811–1872).
- The New York Sun (historical) – purchased in 1916 and immediately merged with the "Press"; merged with the Herald in 1920 (not connected with later New York Sun published 2002–2008 by publisher Ronald Weintraub, edited by Seth Lipsky).
- New York Press (purchased in 1912; merged with the Sun in 1916).
- New York Evening Telegram, purchased the newspaper out-right in 1920, severing the newspaper from its long-time relationship with the New York Herald.
- The Mail
- The New York Globe (bought and merged with the Sun in 1923).

The sale of the Herald in 1924 left Munsey owning only two newspapers at the time of his death the following year. The Evening Telegram was sold to Scripps-Howard in 1927, two years after Munsey's death.

=== Novels ===
Munsey also authored a number of novels:

- Afloat in a Great City (1887)
- The Boy Broker (1888)
- A Tragedy of Errors (1889)
- Under Fire (1890)
- Derringforth (1894)

== Banking ==
Munsey founded the Munsey Trust Company in 1913. It was re-organized in 1915 as The Equitable Trust Company with Munsey as chairman of the board, and became one of the city and state's dominant financial institutions into the late 20th century. It was purchased by Maryland National Bank in 1990.

== Politics ==
Munsey became directly involved in presidential politics when former president Theodore Roosevelt announced his candidacy to challenge his hand-picked successor President William Howard Taft for the 1912 Republican Party nomination for the presidency. Munsey and George W. Perkins provided the financial backing for Roosevelt's campaign leading up to the Republican National Convention in Chicago.

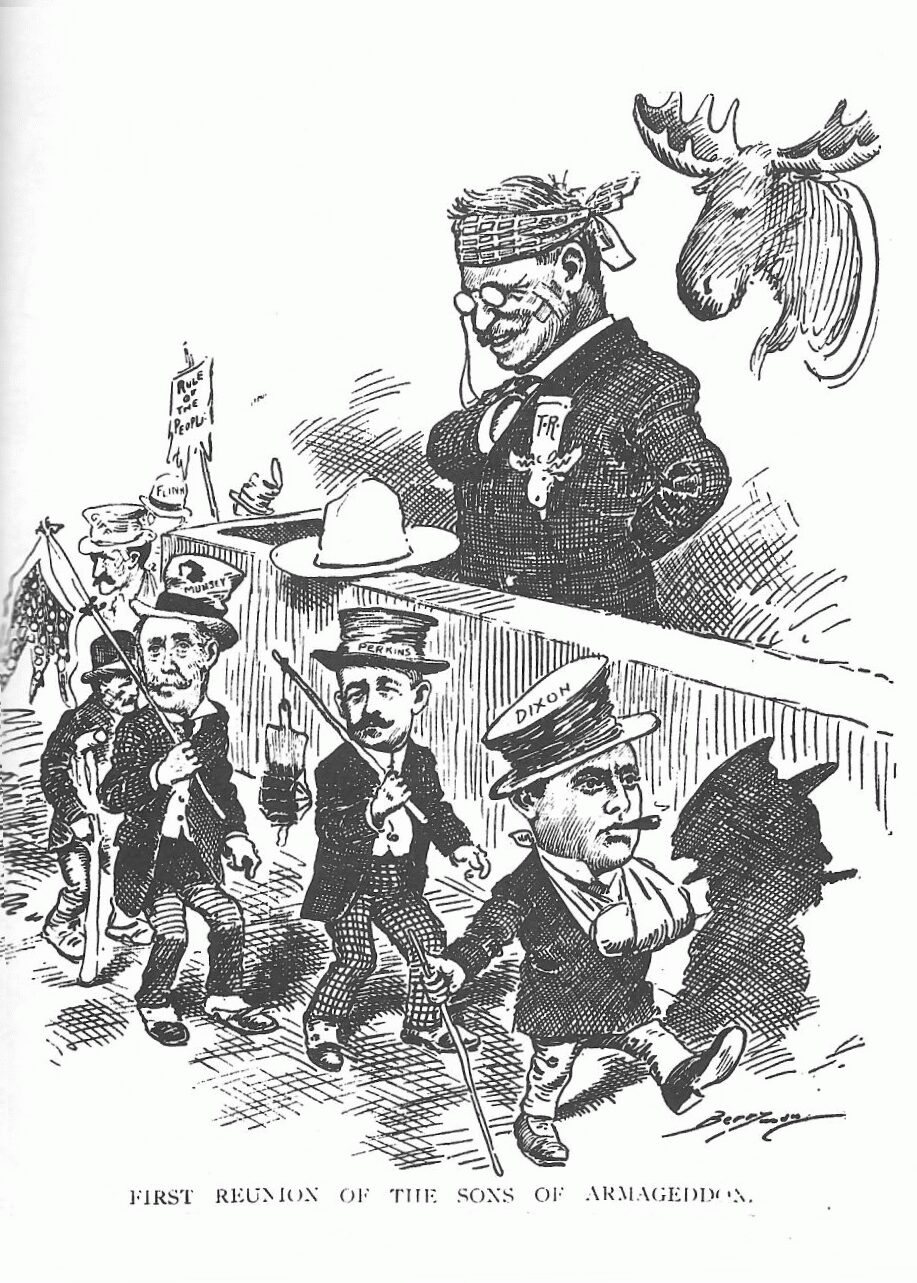
After the defeat the loser reviews his wounded lieutenants Munsey, George Walbridge Perkins and Joseph M. Dixon. From The Evening Star (Washington DC) Dec 10, 1912

When Roosevelt and his supporters bolted from the convention, Munsey was one of the most outspoken critics of what were labeled as "corrupt proceedings" and announced that Roosevelt would run at the head of a new party. Munsey's encouragement and his offer of financial backing led to the formation of the Progressive Party, which acquired the nickname the "Bull Moose Party" (from TR's quote: "I'm as strong as a bull moose", when questioned about his age after previously becoming the youngest president upon McKinley's assassination, serving almost two terms as president) then nominated Roosevelt for president. Munsey was one of its most ardent supporters and one of the largest contributors to its "third party" campaign expenses. The campaign pulled one of the largest votes ever in American history for a candidate not from one of the two dominant parties.

== Buildings ==
In 1905, Munsey built the Munsey Trust Building in downtown Washington, D.C., on 'F' Street, between 12th and 13th Streets next to the National Theatre, off Pennsylvania Avenue. Designed by McKim, Mead and White of New York City with 13 floors, it had ranked among the tallest structures in the Nation's Capital. The first national headquarters of the Girl Scouts of the USA was located in this building from 1913 to 1916. D.C.'s Munsey Trust Building was torn down in spite of a court case and extensive protests by historical preservationists.

Thirty-five miles northeast of D.C., two additional buildings have carried Frank Munsey's surname. The Munsey Building sits at the southeast corner of North Calvert and East Fayette Streets in downtown Baltimore. Its located across from the central Battle Monument Square. The building was rebuilt in 1911 by architectural firms Baldwin & Pennington of Baltimore and McKim, Mead and White of New York City. Baltimore's Munsey Building had briefly been that city's tallest building. This rebuilt structure replaced the newspapers' previous headquarters which had been lost in the Great Baltimore Fire of 1904. The original location was on the northern edge of the devastated downtown district. The Munsey Building was notable for its upstairs offices and its ground floor printing presses, visible to passers-by through large department store, display-style windows designed and built for "The News" of Baltimore.

Under Hearst's ownership, the paper moved again in 1924 to East Pratt Street between Commerce and South Streets (facing the old "Basin"/Inner Harbor piers), The Munsey Building, by then separated from the newspaper was later renovated into an elaborate bank headquarters and customer service lobby of marble, brass and bronze for his Munsey Trust Company. In the early 2000s, after a series of bank mergers and out-of-town take-overs, the building was transformed into apartments and condos with some commercial food and snack shops located on the ground floor, where the grimy printing presses once rumbled and rolled, replaced later by the ornate brass and marble counters for customer service with wood and paneling framed, glass-partitioned offices of the banking empire, but the name remained. Ironically, by 2013, a modern branch office of M&T Bank, an out-of-town corporate bank which also put its name on the city's pro football stadium for the Baltimore Ravens, opened on the first floor facing the ground level streets.

== Death and legacy ==
Munsey died in New York City on December 22, 1925, from a burst appendix at age 71. In his will he made large bequests to his sister, nephew and niece, generous bequests to many cousins, and gifts and annuities to a large number of old acquaintances. He also bestowed large sums to 17 of his upper management employees, but nothing to the numerous employees who worked for him. He bequeathed an annuity of $2000 to Annie Downs, a love interest of the young Munsey who "turned him down for marriage because she didn't think he was a good enough prospect for success." Munsey also contributed considerably to Bowdoin College, the Maine State Hospital at Portland, and Central Main General Hospital at Lewiston.

All the remainder of his fortune he gave to the Metropolitan Museum of Art on Fifth Avenue in New York City. This bequest included ownership of the Sun-Herald newspaper, The Mohican Stores grocery chain, and real estate holdings in Manhasset, New York, on the north shore of Long Island. Under the leadership of Museum President Robert W. DeForest, the Metropolitan Museum developed part of the land into a planned residential community called Munsey Park, New York. It featured Colonial-style houses and streets named after American artists. The community's first model home opened in 1928. By 1950 the Museum had sold the Munsey real estate interests to other developers, realizing an estimated four million dollars from these transactions.

At the time of his death his fortune was estimated to be $20 million to $40 million. Today with the rate of inflation it would be valued at $250 million to $500 million.

== Sources and further reading ==
- Britt, George (1972) [1935]. Forty Years—Forty Millions. Port Washington, New York: Kennikat Press. ISBN 0-8046-1513-6.
- Chace, James. 1912: Wilson, Roosevelt, Taft & Debs — The Election That Changed the Country. New York: Simon & Schuster, 2004. ISBN 0-7432-0394-1
- Duffus, Robert L. (July 1924). "Mr. Munsey". The American Mercury. Vol. II, no. 7. pp. 297–304.
- Ingham, John N. (1983). Biographical Dictionary of American Business Leaders: Volume 2. Westport, Connecticut: Greenwood Press. ISBN 0-313-23908-8.
- Locke, John. "Lost at Sea: The Story of The Ocean," in The Ocean: 100th Anniversary Collection. Castroville, CA: Off-Trail Publications, 2008.
- Lowell, D. O. S. A Munsey-Hopkins Genealogy. Boston: privately printed. 1920.v
- Mott, Frank Luther (1957b). A History of American Magazines: 1885–1905. Cambridge, Massachusetts: Harvard University Press. OCLC 52515840.
- Mowry, George E. Theodore Roosevelt and the Progressive Movement. (1946) focus on 1912
- Munsey, Frank A. (December 1898). "Advertising in Some of its Phases". Munsey's Magazine. 20 (3): 476–486.
- Munsey, Frank A. (December 1907). The Founding of the Munsey Publishing-House. De Vinne Press. Subtitles: Quarter of a Century Old : The Story of The Argosy, Our First Publication, and Incidentally the Story of Munsey's Magazine
