= The Ocean (magazine) =

The second issue — April 1907

The Ocean was a monthly pulp magazine which was started by Frank Munsey in March 1907. It published fact and fiction about sea-faring for eleven issues before being retitled The Live Wire so that it could cover a wider range of topics. The new title lasted for another eight issues before being folded in September 1908.
