= Ogarita Booth Henderson =

American actress (1859–1892)

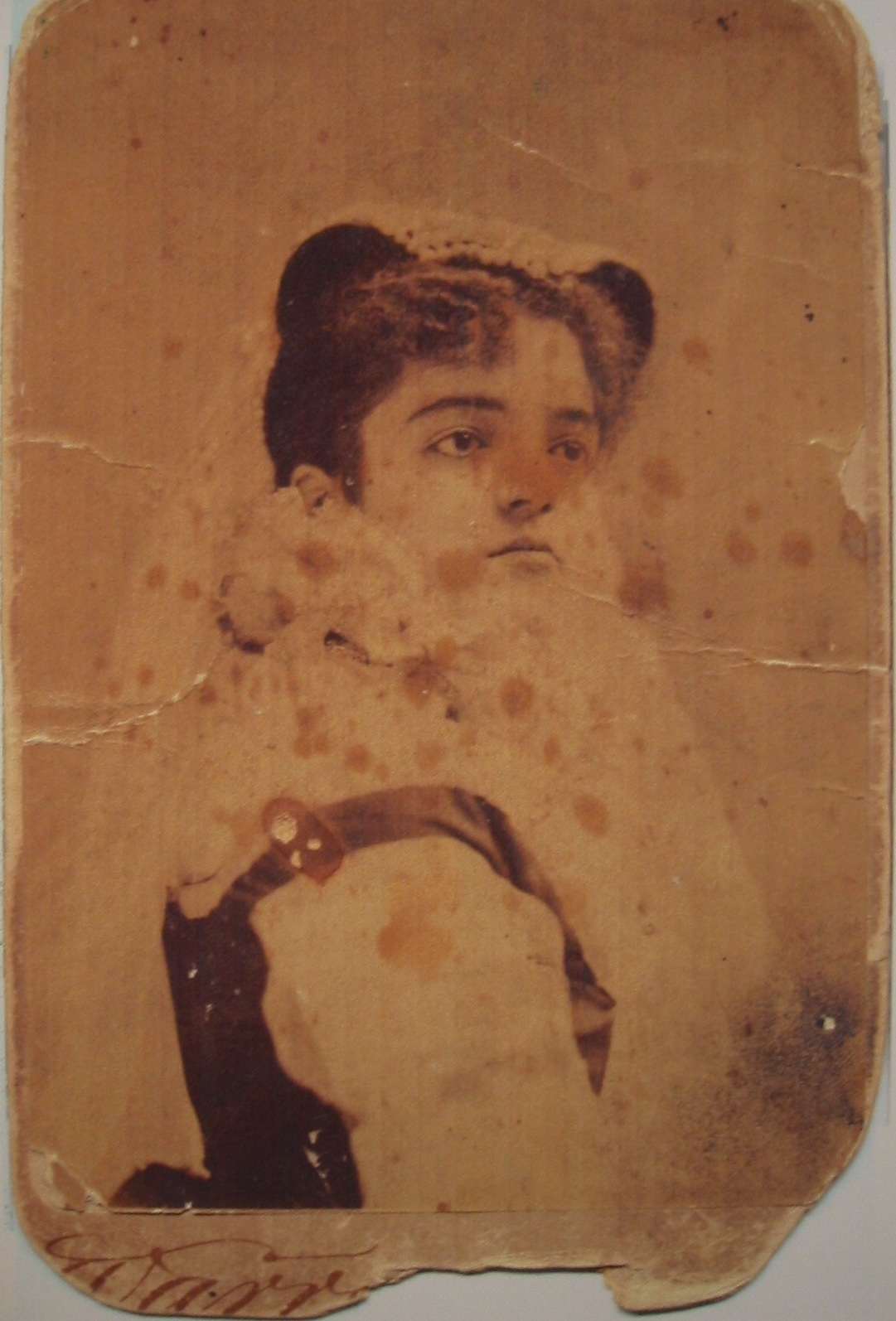
- Henderson as Mary, Queen of Scots (Izola Forrester papers)
- Born: Ogarita Elizabeth Bellows; October 23, 1859; Providence, Rhode Island, U.S.
- Died: April 12, 1892 (aged 32); Binghamton, New York, U.S.
- Resting place: Glenwood Cemetery
- Other names: Ogarita Wilkes; Rita Booth
- Occupation: Actress
- Years active: 1875–1892
- Spouses: William Ross Wilson (m. 1879; div. 1882) Alexander Henderson (m. 1884–1892)
- Children: 3; including Izola Forrester

Ogarita Elizabeth Booth Henderson (née Bellows; October 23, 1859 – April 12, 1892) was an American stage actress. Henderson maintained that she was the daughter of actor John Wilkes Booth, who assassinated President Abraham Lincoln in April 1865.

== Early life ==
Henderson was the daughter of Martha Lizola Mills (1837–1887), with her birth certificate listing Mills' husband, the mariner Charles Still Bellows, as her father. Mills would later claim it was Lincoln's assassin, the actor John Wilkes Booth, who was actually Henderson's father. Throughout her life, Henderson believed that Booth was her father. However, Booth had been performing in Richmond, Virginia in January 1859, making it unlikely that he could have been the father of a child born in Rhode Island. As for Bellows, muster rolls show that he was on board a Navy ship near Montevideo during that time period, making it impossible for him to have been the father of Ogarita Bellows Henderson.

== Career ==
Henderson first appeared on stage in January 1875 at the Globe Theatre in Boston in support of the British comedian J. L. Toole. She was 15 at the time and appeared under the stage name "Ogarita Wilkes". A few months later, she appeared as Donalbain in Macbeth in the farewell engagement of Charlotte Cushman. From this point and for the rest of her life, Henderson travelled across the United States and Canada with various theater companies, except for brief periods away.

She gave birth to Izola Forrester in 1878 but was not married to the father. The following year, she married 64-year-old mill owner William Ross Wilson. They lived in Burrillville, Rhode Island, but Henderson eventually returned to theater life, causing Wilson in to file a divorce petition in 1882 on the grounds that she was a member of the Theatre Comique in Providence. According to her husband, it was a "disreputable place".

In October 1882, she appeared in the W. E. Sterling & Marie Wellesley Company and appeared on stage in such roles as Eliza in Uncle Tom's Cabin (also Izola's stage debut, as Little Harry). Another play Henderson was in at this time was The Old Cross! or The Dogs of the Forest. In the same play was Alexander Henderson (1850–1920), a London-born musical director and actor who grew up in Scotland and came to the United States in the 1870s. The two married around 1884. Henderson appeared on stage with Lillian Russell and Edward Solomon in their 1885 winter tour. In 1885, the couple had a daughter, Beatrice Rosalie "Booth" Henderson, who followed the family tradition and became an actress, and later in life ran a summer theater in Keene, New Hampshire and directed plays in Fort Lauderdale, Florida in the winter. In 1884, Henderson began using the stage name "Rita Booth", which she did for the last eight years of her life.

On May 29, 1890, while playing at the Globe Theater in Columbus, Ohio with the Boston Comic Opera Company, she told a reporter of The Columbus Dispatch that she had been "on the stage more or less for the past fifteen years. She was the leading lady with George C. Milne, the preacher-actor, a few years since, and late with Grace Hawthorn. She made her first appearance on the stage at the Boston Globe Theater, in a minor part. She first appeared in this city at the old Comstock, now Metropolitan Opera House, about seven years ago with Palmer in the "Danites." She appeared later with the Bennett A. Moulton Opera Company, at the Grand, four years ago. ... Mrs. Booth-Henderson has many of the characteristic features so marked in the Booth family and her facial resemblance, as well as her love for the stage, would seem to be strong evidence of the statement she makes. She states that she has a diary containing much important memoranda of her father's life and papers of his, and that at some time not far distant she will make them public."

== Death ==
On April 12, 1892, Ogarita Booth Henderson died from pneumonia at age 32 while on the road with Floy Crowell's Dramatic Company in Binghamton, New York. She was buried in Glenwood Cemetery in Binghamton.

== Sources ==
- This One Mad Act, 1937, by Izola Forrester
- The Elusive Booths of Burrillville, 1991, by Patrichia Mehrtens and Joyce Knibb
