= Baltimore Morning Herald =

Newspaper in Baltimore, Maryland, US

Coordinates: 39°17′25.8″N 76°36′50.4″W

- Type: Daily newspaper
- Format: Broadsheet
- Founded: February 10, 1900

The Baltimore Morning Herald was a daily newspaper published in Baltimore in the beginning of the 20th century.

== History ==
The first edition was published on February 10, 1900. The paper succeeded the Morning Herald and was absorbed later by the Baltimore Evening Herald on August 31, 1904, (six months after the devastating Great Baltimore Fire) appearing on weekends as the Baltimore Sunday Herald. Its offices were located at the northwest corner of St. Paul and East Fayette Streets, facing the west end of the recently completed monumental Baltimore City Circuit Courthouses of 1896–1900 (renamed for Clarence M. Mitchell, Jr. in 1985).

The building of editorial offices and printing plant was devastated by the Great Baltimore Fire of February 1904 and stood on the northern edge of the Downtown Baltimore "Burnt District". The Herald printed an edition the first night of the fire on the press of the nearby The Washington Post (40 miles southwest), in exchange for providing photographs to The Post, but could not continue this arrangement because of a long-standing earlier arrangement between the Post and the competing Baltimore Evening News. For the next five weeks The Herald was then printed nightly on the press 90 miles northeast of the Philadelphia Evening Telegraph and transported 100 miles (160 km) back to Baltimore on a special train, provided free of charge by the Baltimore and Ohio Railroad (B. & O. R.R.).

In June 1906, the paper was purchased by two of its major competitors led by Charles H. Grasty (1863–1924), editor/owner of The Evening News established 1871 as a graphic illustrated later example of the "penny press style of journalism developed first in New York City in the early 1830s. Grasty was joined by another competing paper run by local civic titan and retired General Felix Agnus (1839–1925), longtime owner/publisher since the end of the American Civil War of The Baltimore American, the oldest newspaper in the city dating back to the colonial era and the American Revolutionary War in 1773, with a subsequent reorganization in 1799, considered one of the oldest news sheets still being issued in America. Gen. Agnus assumed editorial control shortly after arriving in Baltimore after the War, and eventually assumed ownership when as a former Union Army officer, he married the daughter of the previous longtime owner / publisher George Dobbin). Assets, staff and resources of the Morning Herald (which had already combined earlier with its short-lived sibling afternoon publication of the Evening Herald) were divided between the two publications of The News and The American which later merged themselves several years later under the new first out-of-town ownership with the purchase of his paper from the ailing elderly General by controversial newspaper magnate / titan Frank A. Munsey (1854–1925), known as the "Dealer in Dailies". Munsey's tenure was brief but eventful, besides razing the paper's office building only put up after the "Great Fire" of 1904, only five years earlier and constructing a new skyscraper editorial offices and ground-floor printing presses behind huge sidewalk display windows. Of course he named it after himself (the Munsey Building still stands today serving later as the headquarters of the City's second largest bank once the paper relocated again when a dying Munsey sold them in turn a number of years later to the national newspaper syndicate of another famous press mogul William Randolph Hearst (1863–1951).

Hearst and his syndicate continuing publication for several decades combining some features handed down from the brief "spark of light" that was the flurry of scoops and hard news reporting on the scrappy little Morning Herald. Along with the old Evening News from Grasty and later Munsey's tenure, Hearst made the also recent acquisition in the Twenties of the brief existence of a tabloid style paper from another national syndicate Scripps-Howard's Baltimore Post. Hearst merging them both as the renamed Baltimore News-Post on afternoons / evenings, six days a week and continuing the historic nameplate of Dobbins / Agnus / Munsey's the Baltimore American (the oldest paper in town, founded 1773 / reorganized 1799, with also the largest circulation in the city, now published only on Sundays), both of these two related papers under Hearst's ownership were printed until 1964, when they were both merged as a combined The New American for seven days a week. Hearst's successor corporation / media chain closed the daily afternoon paper in Baltimore in May 1986.

Thus the descendants of H. L. Mencken s first journalism job at the Morning Herald (and Evening Herald) where he cut his reporter / editor's teeth on, endured in somewhat different form in subsequent descendants and parallel news media in "The Monumental City". The site of its headquarters building at St. Paul and East Fayette is now the site since 1964 (when it replaced a temporary overflow parking mini-lot) of a small landscaped plaza with a dozen thin shade trees and with a modernistic style center fountain opposite the city's Mitchell Courthouse. No historical or descriptive plaque has yet been erected to note the place of an old part of Baltimore's media history of the Baltimore Morning and Evening Herald and its staff of about 125 years ago, except in a few filed photos and huge dusty leather-bound volumes and rolls of microfilm at the City's public Enoch Pratt Free Library, Maryland Historical Society and the Maryland State Archives in Annapolis.

The Herald's most notable writer and novice reporter, soon to become the youngest city editor was H.L. (Henry Louis) Mencken (1880–1956), who described his experiences on the old Herald beat, the disastrous tragedy of the "Great Fire" and his eventual transfer beginning his longtime half-century career with the older highly respected morning "newspaper of record" in town, The Sun, established 1837 by Arunah Shepherdson Abell (1806–1888) a.k.a. A.S. Abell and two others as minor partners. At the turn of the century the newspaper was run by children of the co-founder a decade after his passing as described in Newspaper Days (1941), the second volume of his autobiographical trilogy of memoirs from his Herald career and first days / years at The Sun.

In 2022, the step-child of Mencken's journalism heritage The Baltimore Sun under new owners, moved its scaled down headquarters, editorial offices and reduced staff from its old half-century landmark 1950 building at 501 North Calvert Street (between East Centre and Bath / East Franklin Streets) to occupy several floors in a non-descript 1970s era skyscraper at 200 St. Paul Street / Place by East Lexington Street (above five lower floors containing a parking garage), and one block north of the old Herald building site from a century and a quarter before. Mencken would surely be pleased at the irony and rotating in his grave.
