= Charles H. Grasty =

American journalist (1863–1924)

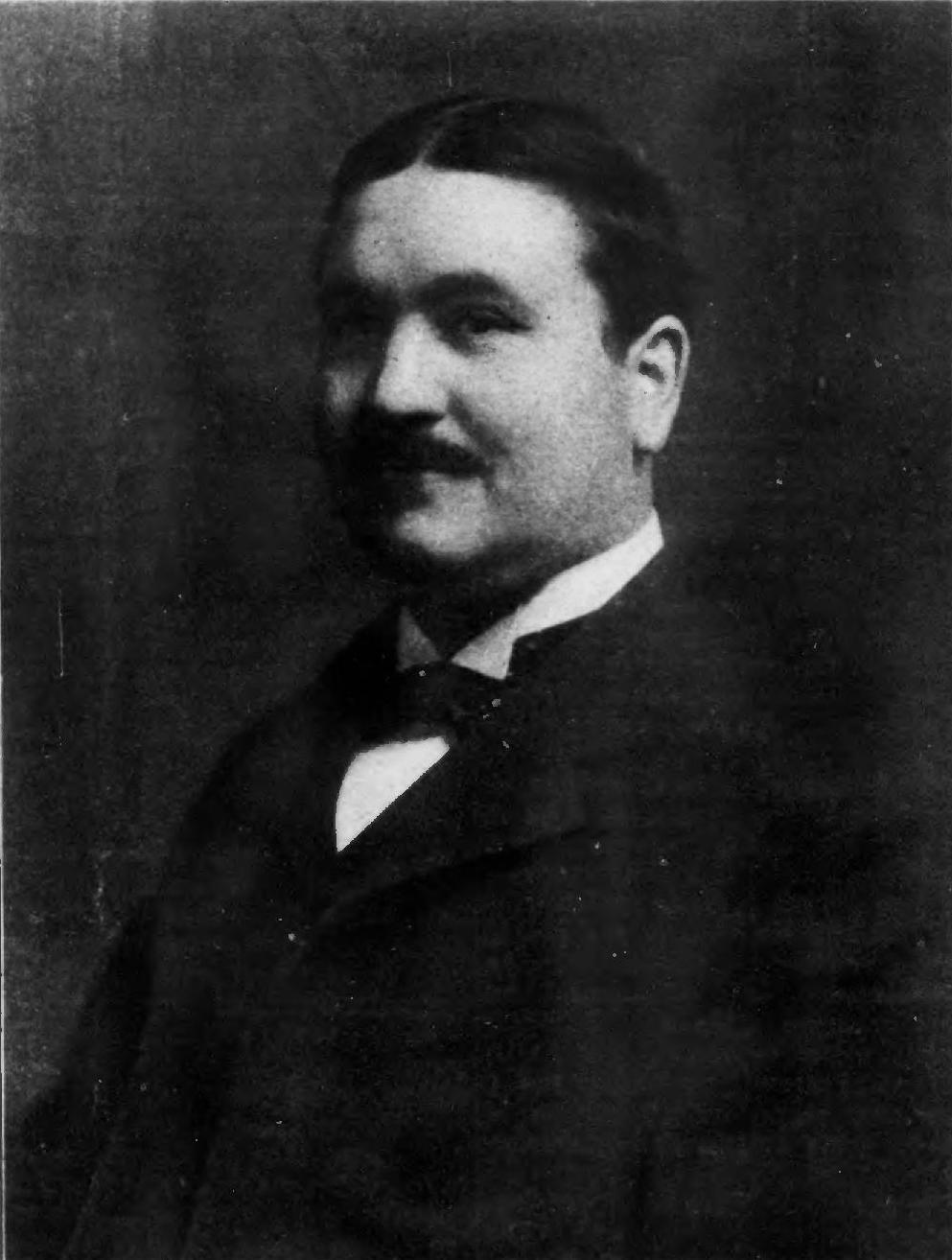
- Born: March 3, 1863; Virginia
- Died: January 19, 1924 (aged 60); London, England, United Kingdom
- Education: University of Missouri
- Occupations: Publisher, journalist,
- Spouse: Leota Tootle Perrin
- Children: Joan Bennett Grasty
- Parent: Rev. John Sharshall Grasty

Charles Henry Grasty (March 3, 1863–January 19, 1924) was a well-known American newspaper operator who at one time controlled The News an afternoon paper begun in 1871 and later The Sun of Baltimore, a morning major daily newspaper, co-founded 1837 by Arunah Shepherdson Abell (A.S. Abell), William Moseley Swain and recently joined by Grasty with a companion afternoon edition entitled The Evening Sun in 1910. Grasty was named among the great American newspaper publishers and owners, such as James Gordon Bennett, Benjamin Day, Joseph Pulitzer and William Randolph Hearst. Grasty owned the Evening News, which had been founded in the early 1870s and utilized the new illustrative technology of using woodcuts illustrations plates to show pictures spread across its pages before the advent of reprinting photographs directly on newspaper pages. During Grasty's tenure The News built its elaborate tall headquarters and printing plant with a corner clock tower on the southwest corner of East Baltimore and South Streets directly across the street from The Sun's older architectural landmark "Sun Iron Building" of 1851, on the southwest corner, constructed of newly popular cast iron architecture style and supposedly fireproof and an early version of a tall commercial office building that gained increasing popularity in American big cities known as the skyscraper. Grasty ran The News for a number of years greatly increasing its circulation and cultural and civic impact on the city as its leading afternoon paper and later sold it prior to briefly acquiring the Minnesota Dispatch and the St. Paul Pioneer Press in the Upper Midwest in separate transactions then later divesting these newspapers to return again to Maryland to seek ownership of The Sun with a syndicate of wealthy backers. Grasty was also one of the developers of the new northern suburban Roland Park community in the early 1890s by the Roland Park Company development firm, said to be an early innovation in community planning, including planned shopping centers and other aspects of the community prior to being offered for sale and development.

== Early life ==
Charles H. Grasty was born March 3, 1863, in Fincastle, Virginia, the son of a Presbyterian minister, the Reverend John Sharshall Grasty, and the former Ella Giles Pettus. He was a bright youth and taught Latin while in high school when there were limited small numbers of secondary schools and students in the early 1880s. At age 16, he entered the University of Missouri to study law, but left before graduating to enter the newspaper business. He stayed on at a summer job reporting for the Mexico Intelligencer paying $6 a week, and then was offered $7 a week to join the Kansas City Star, where he rose to managing editor within 18 months.

In 1890, he married Leota Tootle Perrin, a woman with a daughter from another marriage named Sarah Perrin. That same year, Grasty became the general manager of the Manufacturers' Record, a weekly business journal in Baltimore, leaving the Kansas City Star.

== Newspaper career ==
Grasty was involved in developing Roland Park a new planned neighborhood in north Baltimore by the Roland Park Company in the early 1890s, when he also assembled investors to back his acquisition of The Evening News in 1892, two decades after its founding, now one of the largest circulation papers in town. Through the pages of The Evening News he attacked local political corruption, ran sensationalist stories on highly illustrated pages using new technology for reprinting sketches and drawings resembling photographs to catch the readers eye rather than the traditional lines of text. But at the same time maintained political independence. He came out against the then half-century old competing newspaper of The Sun as a rival for its willingness to ignore Baltimore political corruption, though over a decade later, he would return to take control of that newspaper. His efforts to root out corruption in Baltimore politics ensured the loss of power by longtime incumbent Democrats under Arthur Pue Gorman, who lost the United States Senate seat from which he had dominated Maryland politics for years. In addition, he saw the unseating of I. Freeman Rasin, Gorman's ally and "Boss" along with John J. "Sonny" Mahon who were in control of Baltimore, who was defeated for City Council. Grasty's 1893 accusations against Democratic politicians for their involvement in gambling schemes earned him a libel suit for slander from one of his political targets, which he won anyway.

The Great Baltimore Fire of February 1904 took down much of the city's central business district including the Evening News Building and The Suns "Iron Building". The Washington Post agreed to print The News, and Grasty turned to Adolph S. Ochs, publisher of The New York Times to use the unused printing facilities of the Philadelphia Times. Ochs essentially gave Grasty the machinery. Grasty rebuilt the News and reopened within weeks. It is said that within 16 hours of the Fire, Grasty had acquired a new plant and three new printing presses for $150,000. "First Press Is Here", Baltimore American, Feb. 12, 1904; Charles Grasty to Richard Mansfield, June 30, 1906, NYPL/ms; See Mencken: the American iconoclast By Marion Elizabeth Rodgers.

On June 18, 1906, Grasty and Gen. Felix Agnus (owner of the ancient Baltimore American) teamed up to purchase The Baltimore Herald at the northwest corner of St. Paul and East Fayette Streets whose building had been ruined by the Fire, just across to the west from the untouched new massive City Circuit Courthouse, just completed four years earlier on the northern edge of the "Burnt District". They promptly shut it down, putting its nascent editor H.L. Mencken out of work for a time and divided its assets for their existing newspapers.

Grasty sold the News on 27 February 1908 to chain-maker Frank A. Munsey for $1,500,000. Grasty attempted to remain on as general manager, but resigned within weeks due to disagreements. Later in 1908 he bought a half-interest in a Minnesota evening paper called the Dispatch. Early the next year he bought the St. Paul Pioneer Press, which had both morning and evening editions, and combined its evening edition with the Dispatch. Grasty's style was not well accepted in the Twin Cities and he soon sold the papers back to their original owners and took an extended trip to Europe. However, Grasty was already eyeing The Baltimore Sun, which was still run by the Abell family. Grasty found investors and struck a deal with the Sun founders to leave them with a majority stake, but took for himself preferred shares that guaranteed absolute control of The Sun by him personally. The Abells relented out of fear that Grasty would roll up the local competing papers and compete against The Sun.

After taking control of the Sun, Grasty acquired the Baltimore World at auction in April 1910 for $63,000, overpaying, but fearing a play by William Randolph Hearst to enter the Baltimore market.

Grasty retired in 1915 and went to Europe as a war correspondent for the Kansas City Star. He returned to the U.S. in 1916, served as the Treasurer for The New York Times, before boredom caused him to return to Europe and his work as a war correspondent. In 1918 he published a book, Flashes from the Front. He continued living in London and working as a war correspondent for the Times until his death. He wrote a number of pieces that were published in the Atlantic while he was a correspondent in London.

== Roland Park ==
Grasty was one of the investors of Roland Park, a suburban development in Baltimore at about the same time that he first acquired the Evening News. Grasty lived at Fryer and Caprons in Roland Park, which today is the corner of Woodlawn Ave and Upland. The Roland Park development was said to be an innovation in early development of planned communities. Roland Park included a "store block" arranged in a linear pattern along a street to serve the commercial needs of a planned residential community. Similar store blocks were built in Los Angeles 1908 for the College Tract on West 48th St.

== Politics ==
By 1911, Grasty used the pages of The Sun to back Democrat Woodrow Wilson in his successful bid for the Presidency in the Election of 1912 against Republican incumbent President William Howard Taft and former President Theodore Roosevelt of the then-new Progressive (Bull Moose) party.

== Later life ==
From 1915 until his death in 1924, Grasty lived mostly in London, where he also died. He was known as the local connection for information, and was at the Versailles Peace Conference near Paris in 1919 to discuss the issues ending World War I.

While living in London, Grasty fathered a daughter, Joan "Winifred" Bennett Grasty, with an Englishwoman named Louisa Bennett in 1919. Grasty and his wife Leota had no natural children together. Grasty remained involved in the life of his daughter, and paid for Joan's education in France and later moved Joan and her mother Louisa to the United States, where he financed their living. Grasty died January 19, 1924, and left Joan as his sole heir. Joan had only one child, Pete Robinson.

== Career highlights ==
- Managing editor, Kansas City Star (1884–1889)
- Publisher, Baltimore Evening News (1892–1908)
- St. Paul Dispatch and St. Paul Pioneer Press (1908–1909)
- President and general manager, Baltimore Sunpapers (1910–1914)
- War correspondent, Kansas City Star and Associated Press (1915–1916)
- Treasurer, The New York Times (1916–1917)
- Special editorial correspondent, The New York Times (1917–1924)
- Director, Associated Press (1915–1916)

== Books ==
- Flashes from the Front. New York: Century. 1918. Archived from the original on 2018-08-06.
- Cited as a source for The Literary Digest History of the World War
