= Richard Steuart =

Richard Steuart may refer to:

- Richard D. Steuart (1880–1951), journalist in Baltimore, Maryland
- Richard Sprigg Steuart (1797–1876), Maryland physician
