= Frederick N. Rasmussen =

Frederick N. Rasmussen (b. 1948) is a Baltimore, Maryland journalist. He wrote for the Baltimore Sun for over 51 years, before resigning in January 2025. Since the 1990s he specialized in writing obituaries — with Jacques Kelly they were the primary obituary writers for the Sun. Prior to obituaries he wrote about food, travel, sports, and history. On resigning he said he choose to leave after the Sun was acquired in 2024 by a right-wing billionaire who radically changed the direction and philosophy of the paper in a way that he disagreed with, and that he plans to continue writing for other outlets.
