= Robert D. Loevy =

Robert Dickson Loevy (born February 26, 1935) is a professor emeritus of political science at Colorado College and former journalist whose work focuses on the United States civil rights movement and election-politics. As a journalist for the Baltimore News-American in the 1960s, he worked to include reporting on Black people involving situations other than crime.
