= A. Aubrey Bodine =

American photographer (1906–1970)

Self-portrait c. 1940

A. Aubrey Bodine (1906–1970) was an American photographer and photojournalist for The Baltimore Sun's Sunday Sun Magazine, also known as the brown section, for fifty years. Bodine is known for his images of Maryland landmarks and traditions. Bodine's books include My Maryland, Chesapeake Bay and Tidewater, Face of Maryland, Face of Virginia, and Guide to Baltimore and Annapolis.

He was born July 21, 1906, in Baltimore, Maryland. After entering professional photography in the mid-1920s Bodine's artistic style developed from three distinct affiliations: The Baltimore Sun, the Photographic Society of America (PSA), and the National Press Photographers Association (NPPA). Bodine exhibited his pictorial photography across the United States and around the world, in competitions that attracted top art photographers. Bodine's staff position on the Baltimore Sunday Sun put him into the photojournalistic milieu, with its roots in straight unenhanced photography.

== Career ==
=== "The Sunpapers" of Baltimore (today - "The Baltimore Sun") ===
In 1920, age fourteen, A. Aubrey Bodine went to work at Baltimore's The Baltimore Sun as a messenger. At age fifteen, he transferred to the commercial art department. He assisted a staff photographer and Bodine took a number of the pictures. Bodine's career of shooting pictures for the "Baltimore Sunpapers" (as they were colloquially referred to by native Baltimoreans - The Sun, founded 1837 by Arunah Shepherdson Abell, with the additional The Sunday Sun in 1901, followed by The Evening Sun in 1910) started here. Bodine was also taking pictures on his own time with his own Kodak Brownie box camera. The "Sunpapers"' photographic department was next to the commercial art department. Bodine, when permitted, mixed photographers’ chemicals, developed pictures and made prints. This is where and when his darkroom work began. At that time the offices and printing of "The Sun" were located at what became known as "Sun Square", the southwest corner of Charles Street and Baltimore Street (from 1906-1950), and during his last twenty years at the paper's new headquarters and printing plant (on the site of the old Calvert Street Station of the Northern Central Railroad) at the southeastern corner of North Calvert Street and between East Centre, East Franklin and Bath Streets.

In 1924, Bodine, age 18, was promoted to commercial photographer and his formal photography career at The Sunday Sun began. Bodine illustrated ads that ran in the photogravure section of The Sunday Sun. Bodine also shot pictures that appealed to him personally; a number of these pictures were contributed to "The Sunday Sun" photogravure feature section without credit or payment.

Bodine became Baltimore Sunday Sun feature photographer in 1927, age twenty-one. The Sunday Sun then ran an assortment of local feature stories and pictures about recent events. The influences of the painterly pictorialist aesthetic and the subject-oriented newspaper profession formed the basis of Bodine's photographic legacy.

In 1946, the Sunpapers created The Sunday Sun Magazine. This new format told readers in story form what was going on in and around Maryland, featuring new techniques in writing and design. The new magazine printed with the newer revolutionary rotogravure printing presses which enabled them to make extensive use of photographs in a new editing format resembling independent magazines and their graphics then becoming popular in American media. Bodine was chief photographer and named Photographic Director of the magazine. Bodine photographed postwar mid-Atlantic America, urban and rural. His subject matter included: maritime; ports; heavy industry; assorted occupations; trains; recreation; people; local political personalities and more. Bodine's most popular feature in the magazine was the "Maryland Gallery,” a weekly full-page Bodine picture. The first "Maryland Gallery" picture appeared on December 5, 1948. The premiere article explained Bodine's gallery: "These pictures are more than photographs. They are Bodines—genuine works of art produced over a period of twenty years by A. Aubrey Bodine, photographic director of the Magazine. Many of them have repeatedly taken honors in international salon exhibitions." Few, if any, photo-journalists have had such extensive exposure on the pages of a weekly publication.

=== Formal Education ===
Bodine's formal schooling ended at the eighth grade after one year at the old St. Paul's School in Baltimore (now located further north in suburban Baltimore County at Brooklandville, Maryland). He attended the Maryland Institute Evening School at their old historic downtown Market Place site near Centre Market, (now the Maryland Institute College of Art), for two years, 1932–1933 and 1933–1934, studying ‘General Design’. Photography was not part of his curriculum. Bodine believed these two years greatly influenced and benefited his photography.

=== Professional exhibitions ===
Bodine believed that salon exhibition work was the biggest factor in developing his artistry. He was one of the first newspapermen to take exhibition work seriously; most of his salon prints came from newspaper assignments. He said his newspaper subject matter gave breadth and vigor to his photography. He entered top shows and exhibited a wide variety of prints, not just his proven winners.

==== Photographic Society of America (P.S.A.) ====
Bodine joined the Baltimore Camera Club (Photographic Club of Baltimore) in 1924. Members met and reviewed each other's photographs. They shared information on techniques of developing and printing. The club sponsored local exhibits, called 'salons', and participated in national and international photographic competitions. Formal instruction in photography was limited; the camera clubs provided a learning opportunity and a forum for theoretical discussion.

From his beginning, Bodine was motivated to seek artistic outlets for his work. He was a charter member of the re-organized Photographic Society of America (PSA), the umbrella organization affiliated with camera clubs, throughout the United States and foreign countries. The initial functions of the PSA centered on: publishing the "PSA Journal"; circulating photography information; nationally publicizing the art of photography; and standardizing photography salon exhibitions. Articles about Pictorialism were published regularly.

By the end of his first decade at The Sun, Bodine was an award-winning P.S.A. pictorialist exhibitor. In 1946 he was named a Fellow of the Photographic Society of America “for outstanding press and marine photography, inspirational teaching and creative pictorial work.” In 1965 Bodine was named Honorary Fellow of the Photographic Society of America, praising him “for his talent, accomplishments and encouraging influence in photography as an art, and for his devoted service to the P.S.A. over a long period of years.” The honorary fellowship is the highest honor the PSA can bestow and is awarded only for unique or outstanding achievement in photography; it had been awarded to only 20 others (by 1965), including Edward Steichen, Alfred Stieglitz and Edward Weston.

==== International ====
In the mid-fifties Bodine focused on entering foreign salon exhibitions. He exhibited in Barcelona, Bucharest, Delhi, Ghent, Karachi, Singapore, Sydney and Queensland, Australia, Vienna and Zagreb, Yugoslavia. He won major awards in Argentina, Austria, Australia, Belgium, Brazil, Czechoslovakia, Canada, Cuba, England, Finland, France, Hong Kong, Hungary, India, Luxemburg, Malaya, Mexico, the Netherlands, New Zealand, Poland, Portugal, Republic of China, the Republic of South Africa, Romania, the Soviet Union, Spain, Sweden, and Yugoslavia. In the 1960s Bodine’s salon work wound down. His health was failing and he needed to finish his fourth book, The Face of Virginia.

In 1965 Bodine had a one-man show in Moscow that was the first exchange of one-man photography exhibits between the United States and the U.S.S.R. Bodine’s Soviet counterpart was Vladimir Shakhovskoi, the “dean” of Russian photographers.

==== National Press Photographers Association (N.P.P.A.) ====
The National Press Photographers Association (N.P.P.A.) began with a 1945 conference of eighteen photographers from the major United States newspapers. A. Aubrey Bodine represented the Baltimore "Sunpapers". He worked closely with the NPPA’s first president, Joseph Costa, a New York Daily News photographer, in the forming of a national organization to promote respect and recognition for the profession of photojournalism. Costa said of Bodine: “I considered him certainly the finest print maker I have ever known and the greatest photographic pictorialist of his time-if not all-time greatest.”

In 1948, the NPPA inaugurated its annual awards for photographic achievements. Bodine’s images competed with pictures of hard "spot" news. His photographs were published in a newspaper, but they were from a different genre that set him apart from the majority of NPPA members. He was a feature photographer working with the advantage of a public that was thrilled when Bodine arrived to take a picture. He had none of the daily pressures to produce timely "spot" news photos. His editors gave him flexibility with photo assignments.

In 1953 Bodine was named a "Fellow of the National Press Photographers’ Association" in "recognition of his outstanding achievement as photographer, pictorialist and exhibitor in photographic salons throughout the world and for the attention and recognition which such success has brought to the profession of photojournalism". Bodine was first photographer to have a Fellowship in both the N.P.P.A. and the Photographic Society of America (P.S.A.).

In 1957, Bodine was named "Newspaper-Magazine Photographer of the Year", a distinction created by the judges specifically for A. Aubrey Bodine. The NPPA April, 1957 newsletter elaborated on the new award: "Bodine had the highest point score in the whole competition. ...however the judges felt a distinction had to be made between a photographer covering assignments for Sunday feature use like Bodine, and one covering general assignments—daily spot-news events."

==== Judging exhibitions ====
During his exhibition years Bodine judged in many major Eastern shows. He was interested in, and frequently commented on all aspects of judging photography contests.

== Recognition ==
Bodine’s work gained visibility outside of Maryland and the P.S.A.. Bodine images appeared in the first three issues of "U.S. Camera" magazine: a shot entitled "Two Nuns" in the 1935 premiere issue, an untitled industrial image in 1936, and "Contour Plowing" in 1937. Organized in New York City, with T. J. Maloney as editor and Edward Steichen guiding the selection of images, "U.S. Camera" contained full-page illustrations by amateurs as well as respected professional photographers. Bodine was represented among a cross section of the photographic elite, notably: Cecil Beaton, Dorothea Lange, Berenice Abbott, Imogen Cunningham, George Hurrell, Margaret Bourke-White, Henri Cartier-Bresson, Edward Weston, and Brett Weston. This exposure attracted the attention of editors at Harper's Magazine and Look (American magazine) and potentially could have led to wider recognition for his work. Bodine had neither the temperament nor the inclination to take advantage of this opportunity. His employment at The Baltimore Sun and his private commercial work required his full attention.

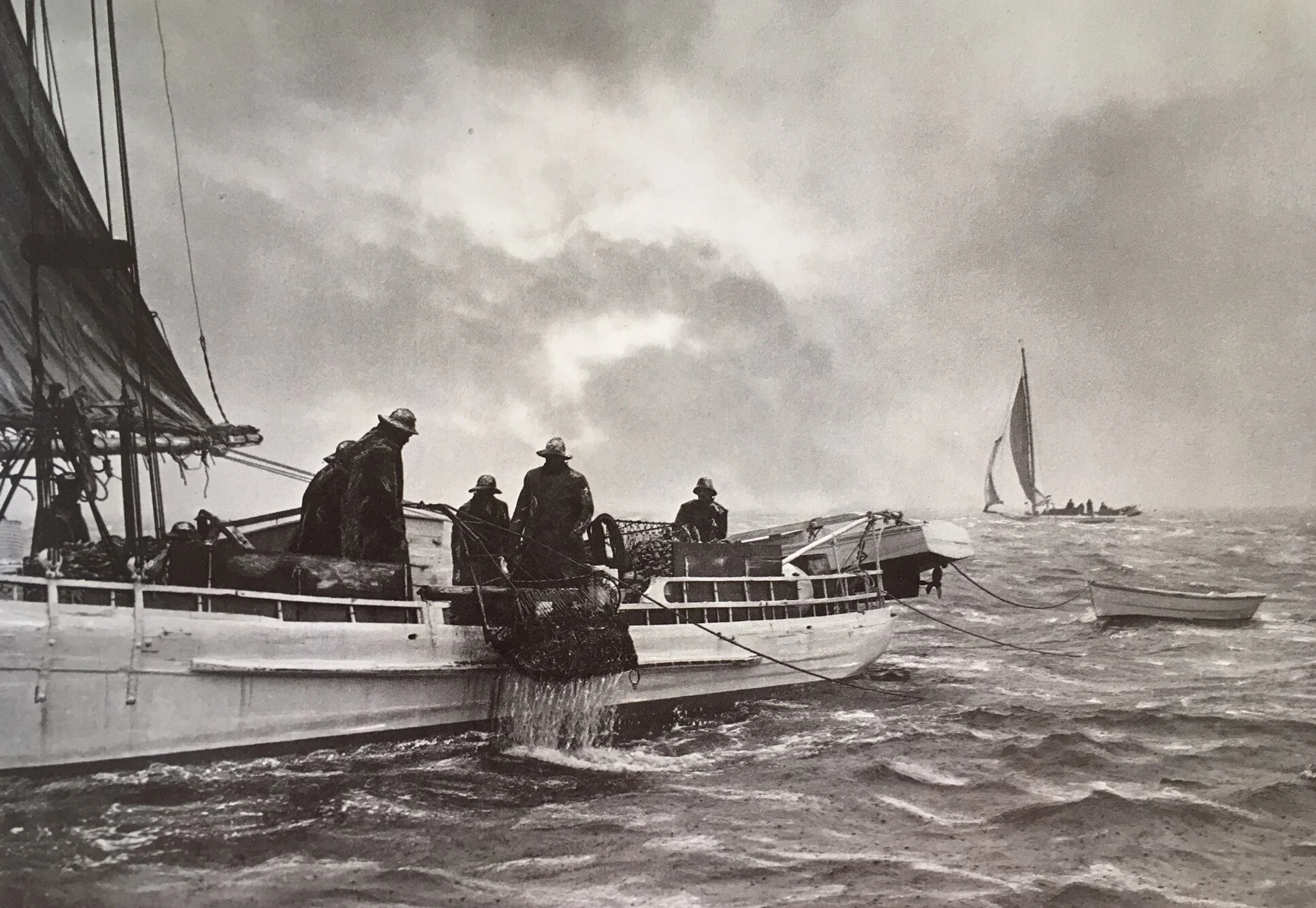
Choptank Oyster Dredgers

Bodine’s best known picture was taken while he was finishing a "Sun" magazine story on oyster dredging. "Choptank Oyster Dredgers" won first prize, a $5,000 savings bond, as "best black and white picture" in a 1949 "Popular Photography" magazine contest which attracted 51,038 entries. Next year’s "Popular Photography’s" contest, which drew 53,554 entries, Bodine's "Early Morning Charge" won second prize.

== Bodine and Associates, Inc. ==
The photography publishing group, Bodine & Associates, Inc. was formed in 1951. Its purpose was to publish Bodine pictures in book form. Bodine's first book, "My Maryland" was published in 1952, followed by "Chesapeake Bay and Tidewater" published in 1954, "The Face of Maryland", published in 1961 and "The Face of Virginia" published in 1963.

Bodine's books were printed in Unitone, a printing technique where fine screen halftones are over-printed in such a way as to give an extra dimension to the pictures. The national lithographers’ trade association picked "My Maryland" in 1952 and "Chesapeake Bay and Tidewater" in 1954 as the ‘best lithographed book’ of their respective years.

Two other Bodine books were "A Guide to Baltimore and Annapolis", 1957, with text by Harold A. Williams and "Baltimore Today, 1969", another guide book with text by James F. Waesche.

"Bodine's Baltimore: Forty-six Years in the Life of a City", was published posthumously in 1973. Additional books, exhibitions and internet websites have been organized and maintained during the 2000s by his daughter, Jennifer Bodine.

== Techniques ==
Bodine's equipment was not elaborate. His first camera was a Kodak Brownie. In his early newspaper days he had a 4 by 5 Speed Graflex with a Verito lens. He went to a 5 by 7 Kodak view camera with five different lenses. For some work he carried a Speed Graphic camera. In the early 1960s he began using a Hasselblad camera for newspaper assignments. He found it easy to carry, an important factor when illness sapped his strength. His favorite large format camera was a 5 by 7 Linhof. He used this for pictorial work. Its large negative was ideal for the detailed retouching he did.

He kept his equipment in the trunk of his car. In addition to cameras and tripods, he had a machete, shovel, child's white parasol, bee smoker, compass, toilet paper, and galoshes and old shoes for swamp jobs. The machete and shovel were used to cut down or remove anything from weeds to saplings that got in the way of his camera angle. The parasol, spotted and stained, replaced the usual flashgun reflector when he needed a softer light. The compass helped him figure his lighting when he was caught in strange territory without sunlight. The bee smoker provided wisps of smoke to create mood or hide a distracting element. Toilet paper was wrapped around flash bulbs to get a diffused light.

Bodine preferred early morning light. He got special effects by aiming his camera at the early morning sun. He said that on a hazy morning with the sun just over the horizon it was possible to shoot into it (the sun) without ruining the picture with glare. He went out at night, particularly if it was snowing or raining. To the editor of "Minicam Photography" magazine Bodine wrote: “Only an experienced photographer would know how to make a decent night picture, and get the lines straight, exposure correct, sufficient imagination to make it on a rainy night, and likewise protect his camera from the rain, and be skillful enough to watch the automobile traffic, especially from side streets."

What Bodine did in his darkroom he taught himself by experimentation; much of what he did was unorthodox. He mixed chemicals by intuition that came from experience, not by following directions on the container. Chemicals recommended by the manufacturer for certain conditions he used in other ways. Bodine used a variety of processes. At one time the PSA circulated a one-man Bodine show that included eleven different photographic processes. Among them were carbros, gum bromides, multiple gums, the bromoil process, paper negatives and carbon prints. Finished exhibition prints from his early period are predominantly in non-silver processes, particularly carbro, bromoil, and gum bichromate, and on a variety of paper surfaces. Heavy manipulation of the negative and final print is evident in his work.

=== Photographic Enhancements ===
Bodine improved his pictures by dubbing in clouds. He kept files of cloud negatives to be added to his prints of landscapes and water scenes. He developed this technique out of an established nineteenth century pictorialist tradition. To compensate for the limitations of their materials, pictorialists exposed negatives containing only clouds and then double printing the final image, first for the landscape and then for the cloud detail. Bodine made no secret of his use of cloud negatives. He wrote: "For years I have been successfully printing in clouds and think nothing of printing clouds on regular routine assignments." With such a technique he could also change the mood or even the time of day in an image. A water scene printed with heavy clouds would appear to be from a negative taken late in the day. The same negative could be printed with lighter clouds and give the appearance of morning or early afternoon. Clouds were not the only elements Bodine added to his photographs. Silhouettes of birds, particularly seagulls, were added to water scenes. To create a well-defined moon or sun, Bodine placed an appropriate size coin on the paper during the darkroom exposure. He added specks of white to simulate snow or rain in his photographs, frequently on the overall image, or, in many instances, simply on certain areas. The snow piled on the ironwork in "Fells Point, Baltimore" was totally added in the darkroom. He used paintbrush and dye to paint details onto the negative for more moonlight reflecting on the water or when he felt additional white highlights would be an improvement. To create a window or frame, he would add fish nets to the final image.

== Personal life ==
Bodine was married to Evelyn Lefevre from 1932 until they divorced in 1942. Bodine married Nancy Tait in 1944. He fathered one daughter, Jennifer Beatty Bodine, who since 2000 has curated, edited and exhibited much of her father's work and continues his legacy. After several years of ill health, Bodine suffered a fatal stroke at only age 64 - in his darkroom at the Baltimore "Sunpapers" at North Calvert Street and Centre Streets and died on October 28, 1970. His work documented the passing of an older, now almost forgotten, era in the history of Maryland and Baltimore and their people, and began to document the emerging modern state and city.

== Notable images ==
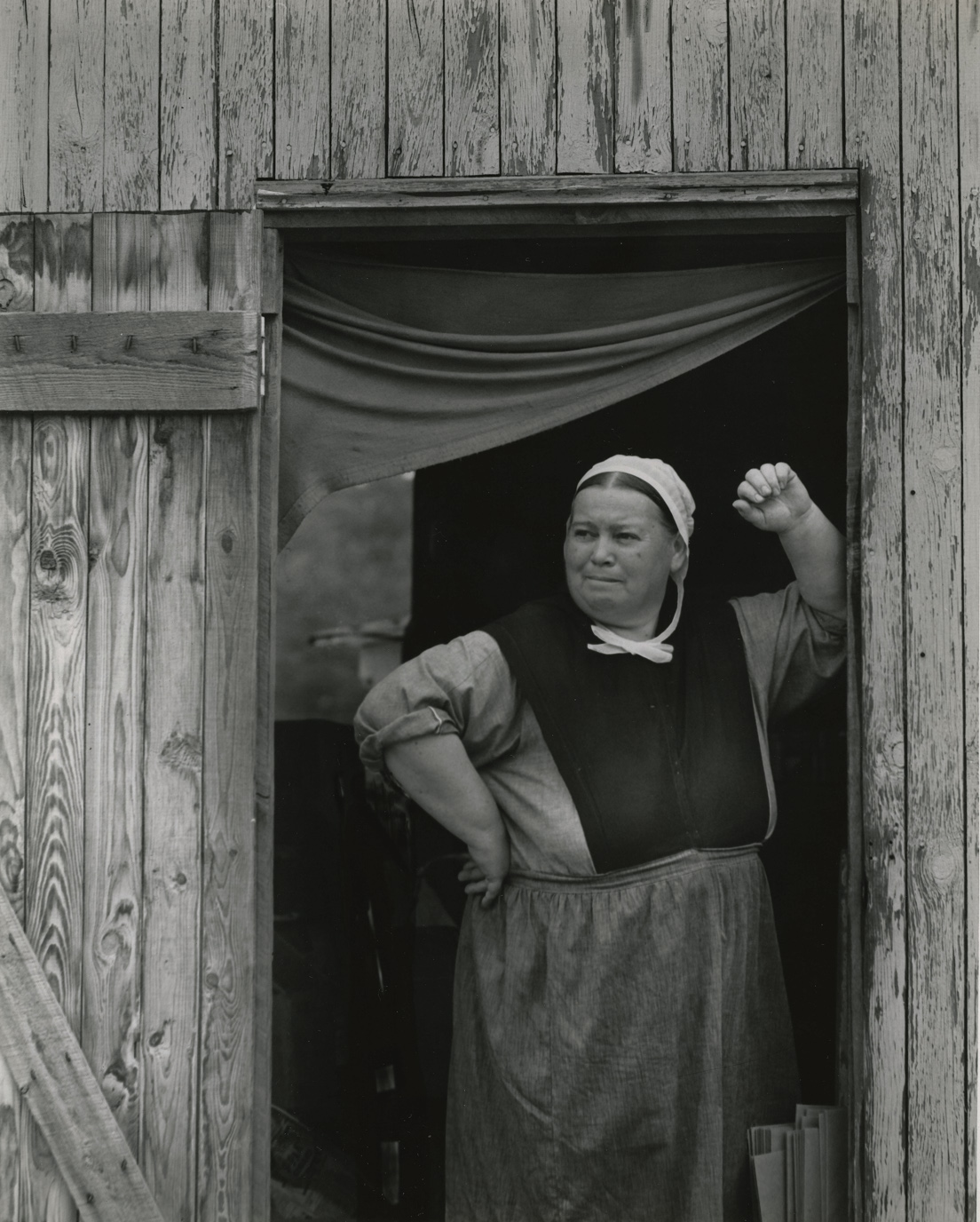
"Amish Woman" (1960)

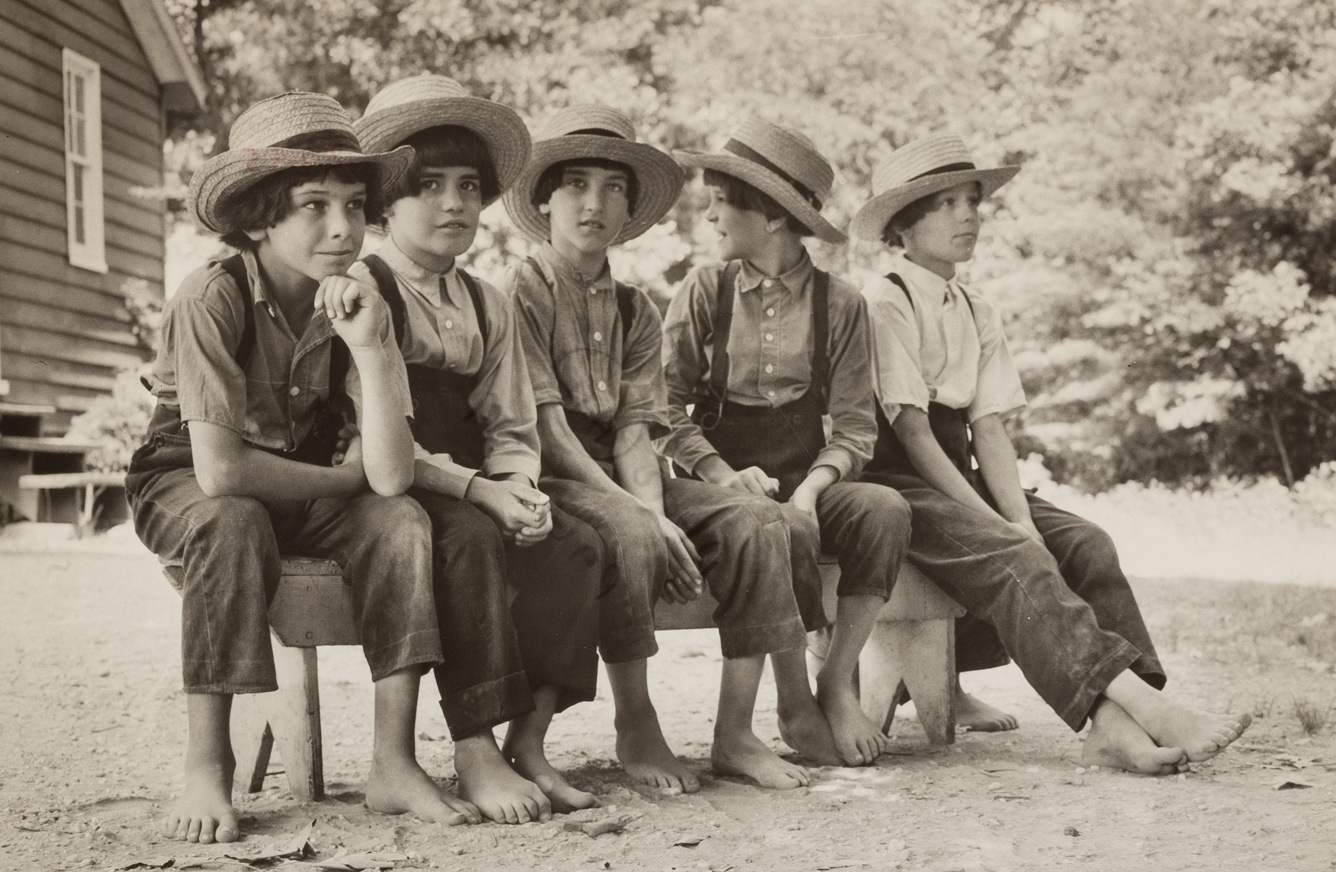
"Amish Boys" (1952)

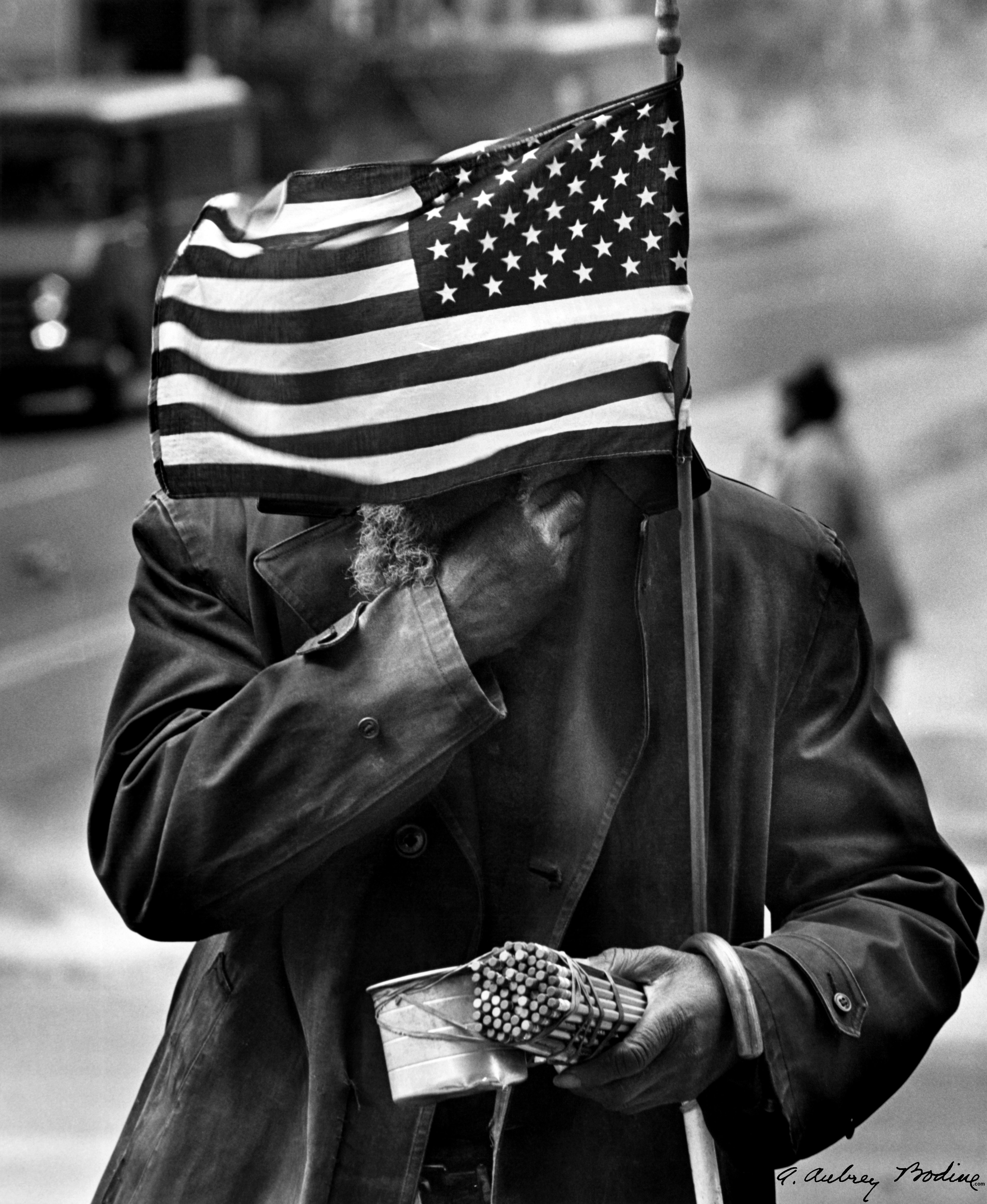
*"Beggar at Howard Street" (1968)

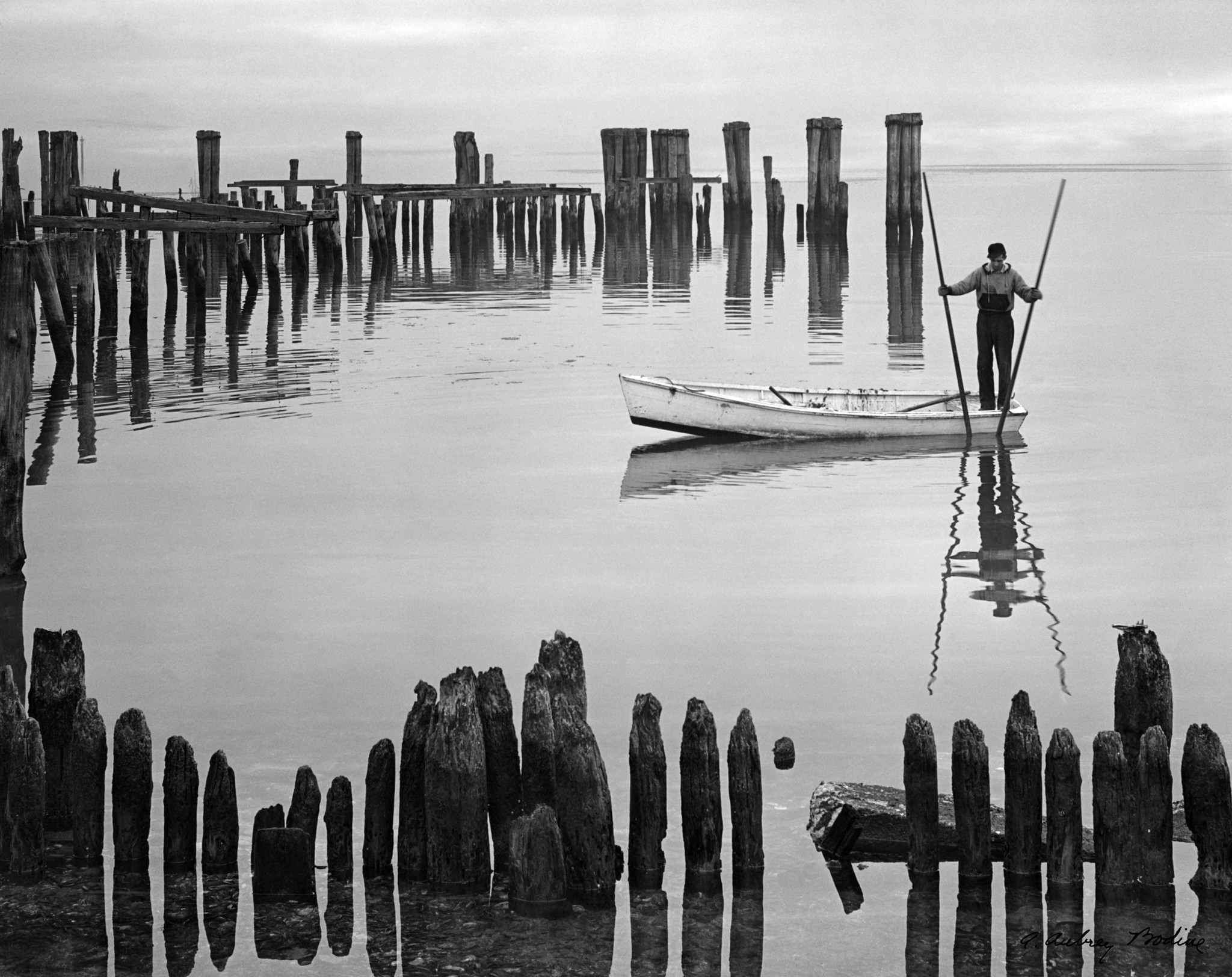
*"Oyster Tonger" (1948)

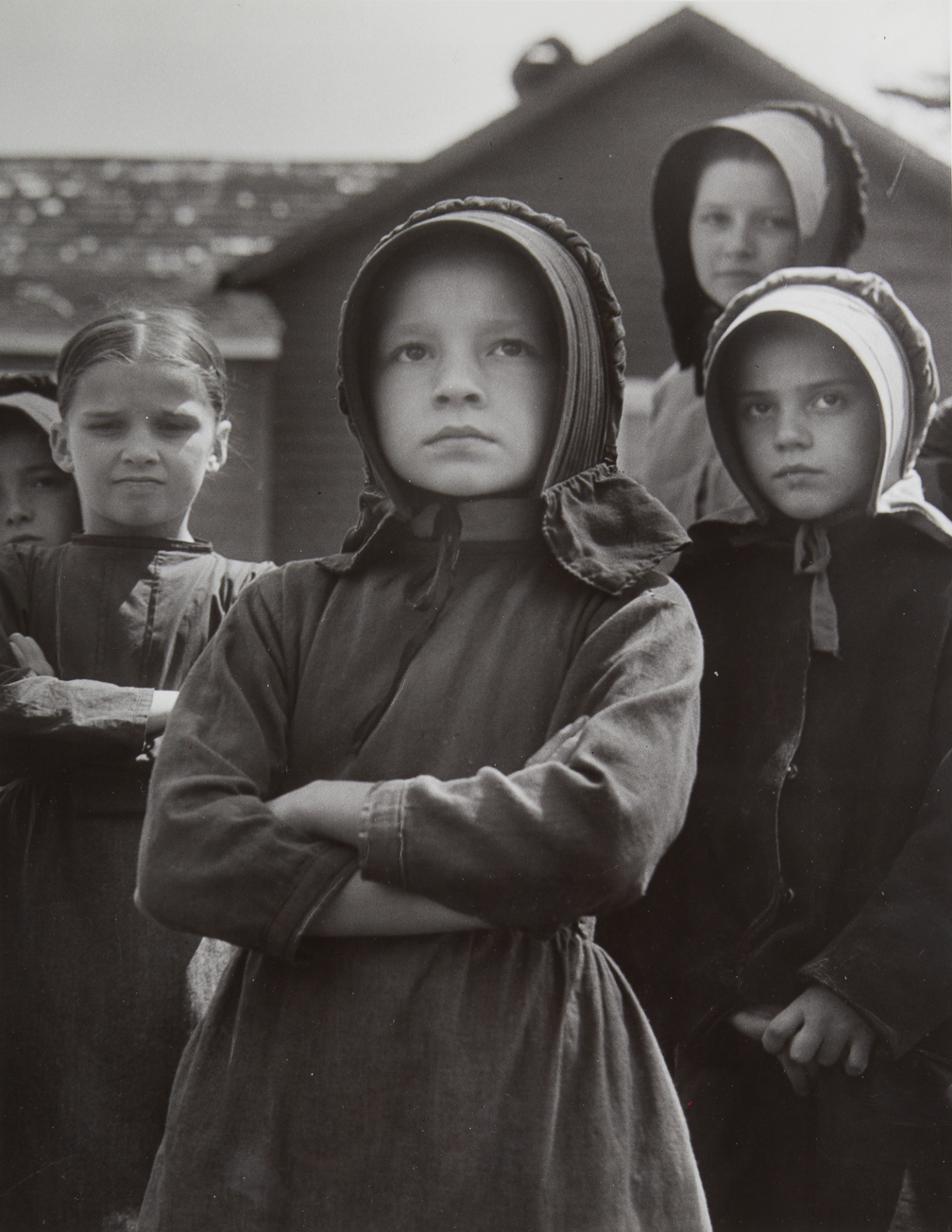
"Gentle People" (1952)

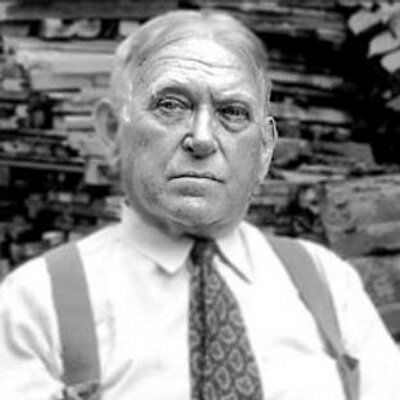
"H.L. Mencken" (1955)

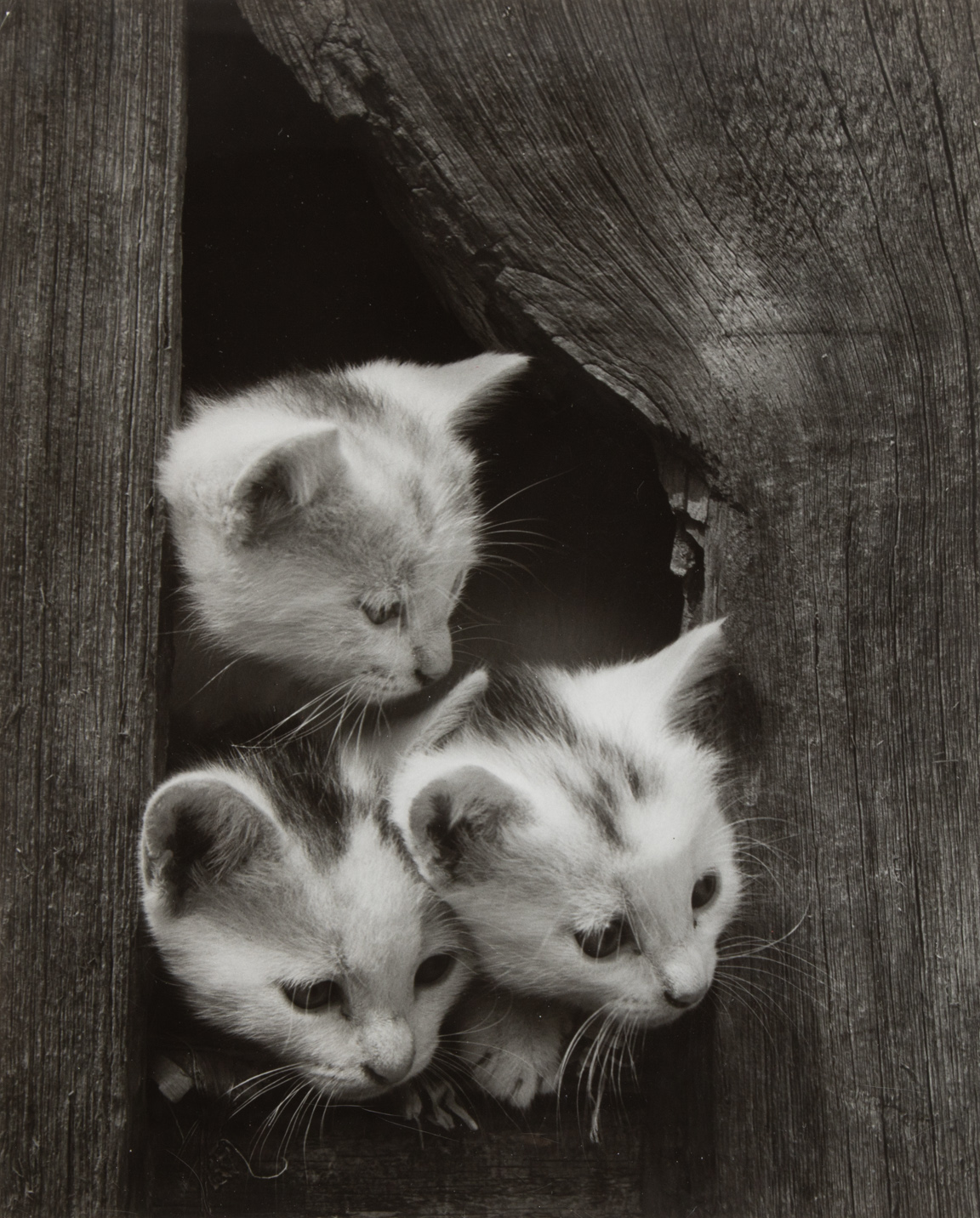
"Three Kittens" (1944)
- "Baltimore Harbor Night" (1949);
- "Barns Liberty Road" (1943);
- "Bessemer Converter" (1946);
- "Birches, Vermont" (1946);
- "Blast Furnaces, Sparrows Point" (1946);
- "Boys Swimming" (1933);
- "Breakfast" (1925);
- "Cambridge" (1929);
- "Checkers Game, Crisfield" (1960);
- "Chesapeake Bay Skipjacks" (c. 1955);
- "Chesapeake Bay Waterman" (1953);
- "Choptank Oyster Dredgers" (1948);
- "Crooked Trees" (1962);
- "Contour Plowing" (1937);
- "Corn Fields" ();
- "Cubist Design" ();
- "Curving Steps" (1943);
- "Devil’s Island" (1961);
- "Duck Hunters" ();
- "Early Morning Charge" ();
- "Fells Point, Baltimore" (1950);
- "Fisherman, Loch Raven" (1950);
- "Fishing Dories" (1925);
- "Fort Macon Beach" (1929);
- "Fox Hunting" ();
- "Gathering Maple Syrup" (1950);
- "Gloucester Dock" (1929);
- "Greenspring Lane" (1948);
- "Gwynn's Island" (1948);
- "Half and Quarter Moons" ();
- "Harpers Ferry, West Virginia" ();
- "Hear My Prayer" ();
- "H. L. Mencken" (1955);
- "H.L. Mencken" (c. 1940);
- "Iced In Spa Creek" (1936);
- "Immigrant Woman" (1939);
- "Industrial Power" (1950);
- "Joe" (1952);
- "Little White House" (1947);
- "Long Dock, Baltimore" (1947);
- "Long Haul" (1952);
- "Longshoremen" (1961);
- "Mainsail Doris Hamlin" (1939);
- "Miner" ();
- "Misty Harbor" ();
- "Mount Vernon Place" ();
- "Nets, Nova Scotia" (1952);
- "New Deal Barber Shop" ()(1951);
- "Nova Scotia" ();
- "Nürnurg" (1930) ();
- "Ocean Ballet" ();
- "Ocean City Pier" (1970);
- "Ocean City Fish Dock" (c. 1955);
- "October Fields" (1949);
- "Overhauling the Mariner’s Friend" (1931);
- "Oxen, Calvert County" (1953);
- "Palmistry Window" (1960);
- "Paratroopers Over Alabama" (1944);
- "Pennsylvania Train Yard" (14945);
- "Piling Copper Cakes" (1934);
- "Pratt Street Dock"(1925);
- "Raking Clams" (1948);
- "Rowing at Ebbtide" (1944);
- "Skipjack Making a Lick" (c. 1955);
- "Snow Around Fence" (1957);
- "Snow Park Avenue" (1948);
- "Spring Wheatfield" (1948);
- "Susquehanna Herring Fishermen" (1945);
- "Symphony in Reflections" (1925);
- "Symphony in Reflections II" ();
- "Tangier Sound" (1948);
- "Ten Thousand Vinegar Barrels" (1945);
- "This Old Home" ();
- "To Hell With It" ();
- "Tobacco Field" (1947);
- "Two Nuns" ();
- "Ward Brothers" (c. 1950);
- "Westport from Hanover Street Bridge" (1949);
- "Wien" (1930);
- "Wind Swept Corn Stalks" (1934);
- "Zebra". ();

== Bibliography ==
- A. Aubrey Bodine (1952). My Maryland. Camera Magazine.
- A. Aubrey Bodine (1980). Chesapeake Bay and Tidewater. Bonanza Books. ISBN 978-0-517-30948-3.
- A. Aubrey Bodine (January 1970). The face of Maryland. Bodine and Associates. ISBN 978-0-910254-30-4.
- A. Aubrey Bodine (1980). The face of Virginia. Bonanza Books. ISBN 978-0-517-30947-6.
- Harold A. Williams (1957). Guide to Baltimore and Annapolis. Bodine and Associates. (photographs by Bodine)
- James F. Waesche (1969). Baltimore Today: A Guide to Its Pleasures, Treasures and Past. Bodine. ISBN 978-0-910254-20-5. (photographs by Bodine)
- A. Aubrey Bodine; Wilbur Harvey Hunter (1973). Bodine's Baltimore; 46 Years in the Life of a City. Bodine.

Titles edited by Jennifer B. Bodine (daughter), since 1970

- A. Aubrey Bodine (2005). Bodine's Chesapeake Bay Country. Cornell Maritime Pr/Tidewater Pub. ISBN 978-0-87033-562-4.
- Jennifer B. Bodine (28 September 2011). Bodine's City: The Photography of A. Aubrey Bodine. Schiffer Publishing, Limited. ISBN 978-0-7643-3844-1.
- A. Aubrey Bodine (28 February 2013). Bodine's Industry: The Dignity of Work. Schiffer Publishing, Limited. ISBN 978-0-7643-4285-1.

== Biographies of Bodine ==
- Kathleen M. H. Ewing (1985). "A. Aubrey Bodine, Baltimore Pictorialist, 1906-1970". Johns Hopkins University Press. ISBN 978-0-8018-3151-5.
- Harold A. Williams (1987). "Bodine: A Legend in His Time". Bodine & Associates, Incorporated, Publishers. ISBN 978-0-910254-00-7.
- Harold A. Williams (1988). "The Baltimore Sun, 1837-1987". Johns Hopkins University Press.
