= Baltimore News-American =

Defunct daily newspaper in Maryland, US

- Type: Daily newspaper
- Format: Broadsheet
- Founded: 1964
- Ceased publication: May 27, 1986

The Baltimore News-American was a broadsheet newspaper published in downtown Baltimore, Maryland until May 27, 1986. It had a continuous lineage (in various forms) of more than 200 years. For much of the mid-20th century, it had the largest circulation in the city.

== History ==
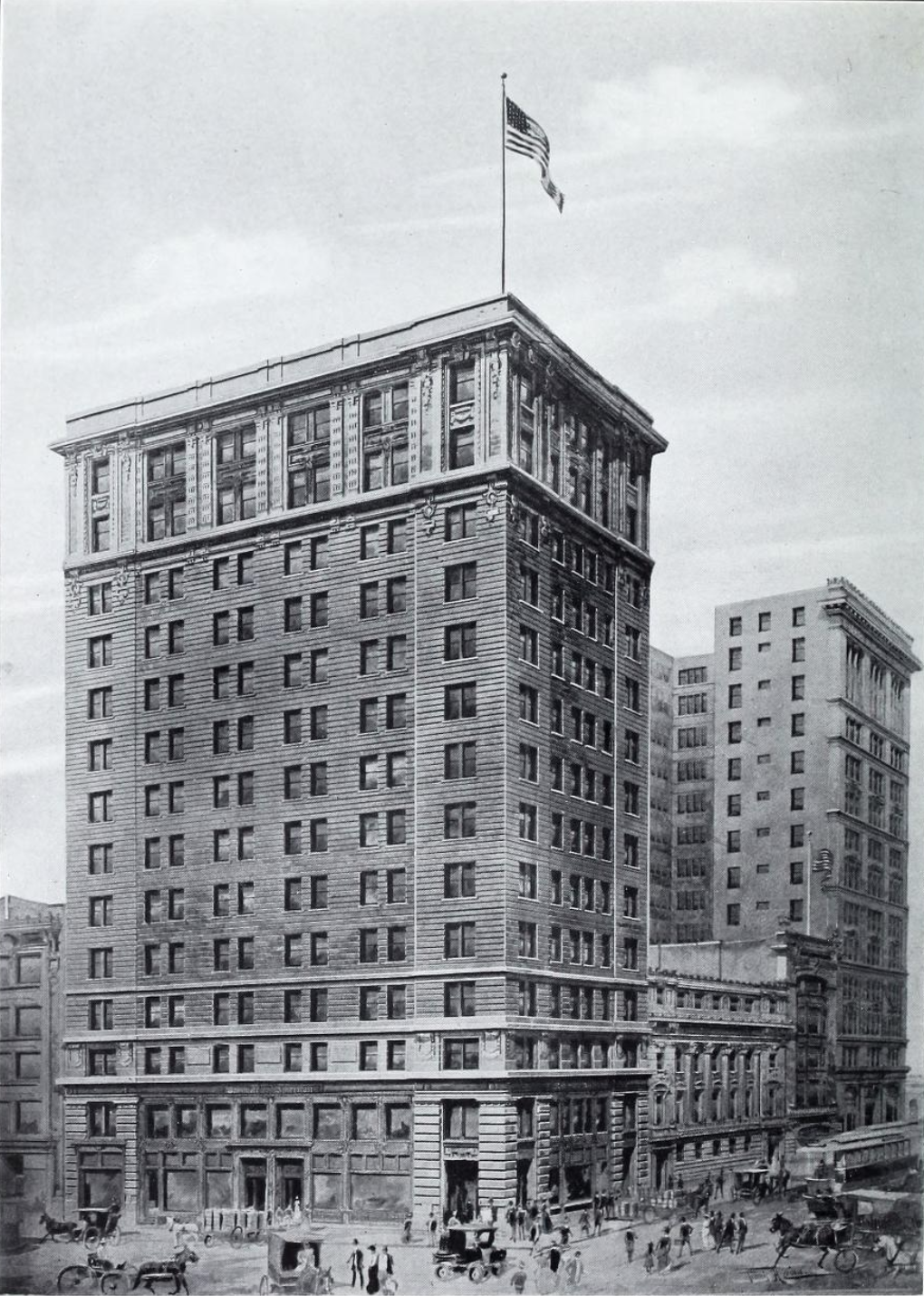
Drawing of the Baltimore American Building in 1914 publication

The entity known as the News American was formed by a final merger of two papers, the Baltimore News-Post and The Baltimore Sunday American, in 1964, after a 191-year history and weaning process. Those newspapers each had a long history before the merger, in particular the Baltimore American which could trace its lineage unbroken to at least 1796, and, traditionally, it claimed even earlier antecedents to 1773. Other precursor newspapers The News and the Baltimore Post were founded in 1873 and 1922, respectively, and broke new ground in graphics, technology, journalistic style, and quality of writing and reporting.

For most of the last two-thirds of the 19th century, the buildings of the two main newspapers of the city faced each other across South Street along East Baltimore Street, with The Sun's "Iron Building" of revolutionary cast iron front design reflecting the earliest "skyscraper" construction technique of 1851. Built opposite later in 1873, was The News office/printing establishment featured a mansard roof and a corner clock tower. Longtime owner/editor Charles H. Grasty, who bought the Evening News in 1892, directed the newspaper's coverage of the burgeoning, gritty late-19th Century city, using advanced presses and techniques of graphics, line drawings. and larger headlines in the short days before the advent of printed page photographs.

Competing with "the other paper" across the street, bulletin boards, chalk boards across the second floor front of the building and hawking "newsies" (newspaper delivery boys) with the latest news, telegraphed election results made the intersection the hottest place to be in the Victorian downtown central district.

All this perished in smoke with the "Great Baltimore Fire" of February 1904, which burned out both buildings. Publication was temporarily shifted to other neighboring cities such as New York City, Philadelphia, and Washington, D.C.

Charles and Baltimore Streets, at the geographic center of Baltimore, became the site of a new marble Beaux Arts classical-style publishing offices for The Sun papers for the next 45 years. The corner was nicknamed "Sun Square." The Baltimore American had a towering office skyscraper, the American Building, quickly rebuilt on the same site with a distinctive elaborate green ground floor with gold lettering showing the newspaper's logo and masthead and the dates 1773 and 1904 over the doorways. An additional printing plant several blocks south was located on East Pratt between South and Commerce streets, facing what then was called "The Basin" and its wharves, and today is known as the Inner Harbor. It, too, was built after the 1904 Great Fire, which devastated most of downtown Baltimore.

An additional office building a block north, facing East Lombard Street, was built later in 1924 and supplemented with a more modern printing plant between the two buildings along the South Street side in 1965 after the final merger of the News-Post and the American. The South Street complex was torn down several years after the newspaper's closing in 1986, and remained a parking lot and a source of controversy for Inner Harbor area redevelopment. With the construction of a massive tower initially named Commerce Place on the block between South and Commerce streets in 1991, the intersection and battleground of Baltimore and South Streets (and intersecting North Street [later Guilford Avenue]) are now relatively unknown for the "Newspaper Wars" that ebbed and flowed there through most of the 1800s. The tower was later renamed and made headquarters for the longtime local investment/financial/banking firm Alex. Brown & Sons following its takeover by Germany's Deutsche Bank.

Another casualty of "The Great Fire" was the Baltimore Morning Herald. It had been founded in February 1900 and combined with the Baltimore Evening Herald on August 31, 1904, six months after its headquarters building at the northwestern corner of St. Paul and East Fayette Streets was consumed by the blaze. The massive City Circuit Courthouse (now the Clarence Mitchell, Jr. Courthouse) just to the east across the street, completed four years earlier, was unharmed. The paper's young editor, employed for four years since graduating from Baltimore Polytechnic Institute, Henry Louis Mencken was displaced from his office and arrangements had to be made to print the paper in another city and ship it back into Baltimore.

Several years later, in June 1906, The Herald was bought out by competitors Grasty and his News joined with Gen. Felix Agnus, owner/publisher of The Baltimore American and the staff, assets and resources divided between the two older papers that were now the largest in the city. Mencken described his early reporting years in the second volume of his autobiographical trilogy Newspaper Days published in 1941.

The Baltimore American, claimed to be a direct descendant of the original Maryland Journal and Baltimore Advertiser was founded in 1773 and had a long-time editor/publisher with C.C. Fulton during the middle 19th Century. After the American Civil War, Felix Agnus, returned from the war and settled in Baltimore and became manager of the American and eventually married the Fulton's daughter. Within a decade, he became the editor and publisher following the death of Fulton. Agnus, who was born in Paris and having earlier served in the Imperial French Army of Napoleon III, was a major with the 165th New York Regiment and late in the war he was breveted a brigadier general in March 1865, and he continued using the title after retiring. He became very active in a variety of civic, social and political affairs of the city, including heading up the Centre Market Commission, which was responsible for rebuilding the Market Place after the devastation caused by the Great Baltimore Fire of February 1904. He was also very proud that his new skyscraper for the American was the first to be completed in early 1905 in the "burnt district." He died in October 1925 at 86, several years after selling the paper to a very controversial and often hated man in America.

William Randolph Hearst's Hearst Company newspaper empire acquired the morning American from Agnus and the afternoon News from Grasty in 1923 from another newspaper mogul Frank A. Munsey (who also owned the New York Herald, New York Sun, New York Telegraph and Washington Times). Known as the "Dealer in Dailies" and the "Undertaker of Journalism", Munsey purchased The News in 1908, just two years after the paper had been forced out from its burned-out headquarters across from The Sun into a new skyscraper and publishing tower at the southeast corner of North Calvert Street and East Fayette Street (across from the Battle Monument Square, which had survived untouched on the northern edge of the "Burnt District"). As the first non-resident owner of The American in its already long history, but not satisfied with this new property of The News headquarters, Munsey promptly tore it down just a few years later and rebuilt it in 1911 in larger and grander style as the then briefly tallest building in Baltimore, designed by the famed architectural firms of Baldwin & Pennington of Baltimore and McKim, Mead and White of New York City and named it The Munsey Building, with large ground-floor windows so passers-by could see the massive printing presses which printed the day's papers.

Mumsey also became the owner of a new large local bank known as The Munsey Trust Company, founded in 1913 and later reorganized in 1915 into The Equitable Trust Company with Munsey as chairman of the board. It became one of the city and state's largest financial empires into the 1990s. However, by 1924, when The News moved to new offices and printing presses at East Pratt and Commerce Streets facing the waterfront's wharves, the building was again renovated into the bank's headquarters for the next seventy years until another transformation after a series of bank mergers and out-of-town ownership take-overs in the early 2000s made it into apartments and condos. The Scripps-Howard Baltimore Post, a late-comer to the local newspaper scene, founded 1922 was later acquired and merged with The News by the Hearst Company in 1936 to create the Baltimore News-Post under the Hearst banner along with the old ancient The Baltimore American, which was published now only on Sundays.

In 1964, the News-Post and American became published as The News American with a newly designed masthead logo and vignette (sketch). It was the largest circulation daily in Baltimore, especially prominent in the working-class and blue-collar districts until the early 1970s. A series of format changes and staff realignments that alienated many readers under a new editing regime in 1977, along with new problems – delivering an afternoon paper through the after-work day traffic congestion ("drive time") to the outer suburbs, and changing evening leisure habits of the middle classes not allowing much time for paper reading – caused circulation to gradually decline after it had been the largest in the metro area. The paper's last edition was published on May 27, 1986, with the headline: "SO LONG, BALTIMORE", and its demise left The Baltimore Sun (founded 1837, it had just coincidentally been sold several weeks earlier by the longtime family publishers A.S. Abell Company to the national syndicate and newspaper chain Times-Mirror Company of the Los Angeles Times) as the sole broad-circulation daily in Baltimore, but it was not announced publicly until after the surprise folding of its main competitor.

The stunning news of the multimillion-dollar sale was just announced several days after equally stunning closure of News American, leaving The Sun published in the morning and The Evening Sun (founded 1910) in the afternoon as the only papers left. Separate staffs and content were maintained until the early 1990s when the editions became similar until September 15, 1995, when the evening paper was finally discontinued with a sad banner "GOOD NIGHT, HON" and many of its features and staff combined with the morning paper, which eventually was renamed and publicized as The Baltimore Sun by 2005.

In 2000, Times-Mirror Company merged with the Tribune Company of the Chicago Tribune to form a larger syndicate including The Baltimore Sun, which later entered into bankruptcy in 2009 for four years after being acquired by billionaire investor Sam Zell.

=== Lineage ===
==== Baltimore American ====
April 1912

- 1773: The Maryland Journal, and the Baltimore Advertiser
- 1796–1798: Eagle of Freedom; or, the Baltimore Town and Fell’s Point Gazette
- 1798–1799: Baltimore Intelligencer
- 1799–1802: American and Daily Advertiser (also published as the American and Baltimore Daily Advertiser and the American and Mercantile Daily Advertiser)
- 1802–1853: American and Commercial Daily Advertiser
- 1854–1856: American and Commercial Advertiser (also Baltimore Weekly American)
- 1857–1861: Baltimore American and Commercial Advertiser
- 1861–1869: American and Commercial Advertiser
- 1870–1883: Baltimore American and Commercial Advertiser
- 1883–1964: Baltimore American

==== Baltimore News ====
- 1873–1875: Evening News
- 1876–1892: Baltimore Daily News
- 1892–1934: Baltimore News

==== Baltimore Post ====
- 1922–1929: Baltimore Daily Post
- 1929–1934: Baltimore Post

==== Baltimore News-Post ====
- 1934–1936: Baltimore News and the Baltimore Post (formed by merger of News and Post)
- 1936–1964: Baltimore News-Post

==== The News American ====
- 1964–1986: The News American (formed by merger of Baltimore News-Post [published Monday to Saturday] and Baltimore American [then published only on Sundays]).

The revamped News American was published seven days a week with the usually thick special Sunday edition of many sections. The masthead was redesigned with a new vignette with the old Phoenix Shot Tower in the center and the city skyline buildings behind, surmounted by the traditional Hearst stylized eagle. For the first time, the paper was referred to without the city name on the masthead. A new printing presses plant structure was constructed in the center of the block between East Pratt and East Lombard Streets. It joined previous structures facing opposite directions with loading docks on the east side facing Commerce Street and a large brick wall facing the South Street side on the west. A huge anodized aluminum name plate was attached, visible from both streets and passing traffic, next to a new entrance lobby (with exhibits and display boards with history of the newspapers). Entrances on Pratt and Lombard were closed. The paper used a new postal address on South Street.

== Notable personnel ==
- John L. Carey, was editor of the Baltimore American in 1845. He published a number of books and pamphlets on the question of slavery prior to the American Civil War.
- Richard D. Steuart, author of the Day by Day column under the pseudonym Carroll Dulaney

== 2005 On the Forward Edge ==
In 2005, the Baltimore Banner featured in a chapter of a novelistic retelling of history called On the Forward Edge by Robert D. Loevy, professor emeritus at Colorado College. The name here substitutes for a real-life newspaper (Baltimore News-Post), owned by the "Patriot Newspaper chain" (Hearst Corporation), competing with the Baltimore Beacon (Baltimore Sun). The chapter focuses on a civil rights protest at a local restaurant chain, amidst which the protagonist realizes: "it was the first time in history that photographs of African-Americans, except for wanted criminals, were printed in the Baltimore Banner."
