= Great Baltimore Fire =

1904 fire in Baltimore, Maryland, United States

Coordinates: 39°17′19.3″N 76°37′9″W

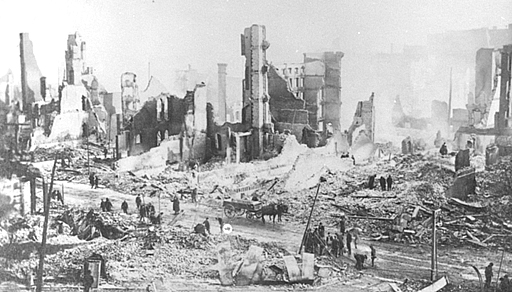
An illustration of the aftermath of the Great Baltimore Fire in February 1904

The Great Baltimore Fire raged in Baltimore, Maryland from Sunday February 7 to Monday February 8, 1904. More than 1,500 buildings were completely leveled, and some 1,000 severely damaged, bringing property loss from the disaster to an estimated $100 million, or $3.6 billion in 2026. 1,231 firefighters helped bring the blaze under control, both professional paid truck and engine companies from the Baltimore City Fire Department (B.C.F.D.) and volunteers from surrounding counties and outlying towns, as well as out-of-state units that arrived on the major railroads. The fire destroyed much of central Baltimore, including over 1,500 buildings covering an area of some 140 acres (57 ha).

From North Howard Street in the west and southwest, the flames spread north through the retail shopping area as far as Fayette Street and began moving eastward, pushed by the prevailing winds. Narrowly missing the new 1900 Circuit Courthouse, now the Clarence M. Mitchell Jr. Courthouse, fire passed the historic Battle Monument Square from 1815 to 1827 at North Calvert Street, and the quarter-century-old Baltimore City Hall, built in 1875 on Holliday Street; and finally spread further east to the Jones Falls stream which divided the downtown business district from the old East Baltimore tightly-packed residential neighborhoods of Jonestown (also known as Old Town) and newly named "Little Italy". The fire's wide swath burned as far south as the wharves and piers lining the north side of the old "Basin" (today's "Inner Harbor") of the Northwest Branch of the Baltimore Harbor and Patapsco River facing along Pratt Street.

It is considered the third worst conflagration in an American city, surpassed only by the Great Chicago Fire of 1871, and the San Francisco Earthquake and Fire of 1906. Other comparable major urban disasters are the Galveston Hurricane of 1900 and most recently, Hurricane Katrina that hit New Orleans and the Gulf of Mexico coast in August 2005. One reason for the fire's long duration was the lack of national standards in firefighting equipment. Although fire engines from nearby cities (such as Philadelphia and Washington, D.C. as well as units from New York City, Virginia, Wilmington, and Atlantic City) responded with horse-drawn pumpers, wagons, and other related equipment (primitive by modern-day standards, but only steam engines were motorized in that era) carried by the railroads on flat cars and in box cars, many could not help since their hose couplings did not fit Baltimore's fire hydrants.

Much of the destroyed area was rebuilt in relatively short order, and the city adopted a building code, stressing fireproof materials. Perhaps the greatest legacy of the fire was the impetus it gave to efforts to standardize firefighting equipment in the United States, especially hose couplings.

== Background ==
In centuries past, fires regularly ravaged cities, frequently destroying large areas within. Close living quarters; lax, unenforced, or non-existent building codes; and a widespread dearth of firefighting services were all contributing factors to the frequency and extent of urban fires. The rapid expansion of American cities during the nineteenth century also contributed to the danger.

In addition, firefighting practices and equipment were largely nonstandardized, with each city having its own system. As time passed, these cities invested more in the systems that they already had, increasing the costs of any conversion. In addition, early equipment was often patented by its manufacturer. By 1903, over 600 sizes and variations of fire hose couplings existed in the United States. Despite efforts to establish standards being made since the 1870s, they had little effect: no city wanted to abandon its system, few saw any reason to adopt standards, and equipment manufacturers did not want competition.

== Progression of the fire ==
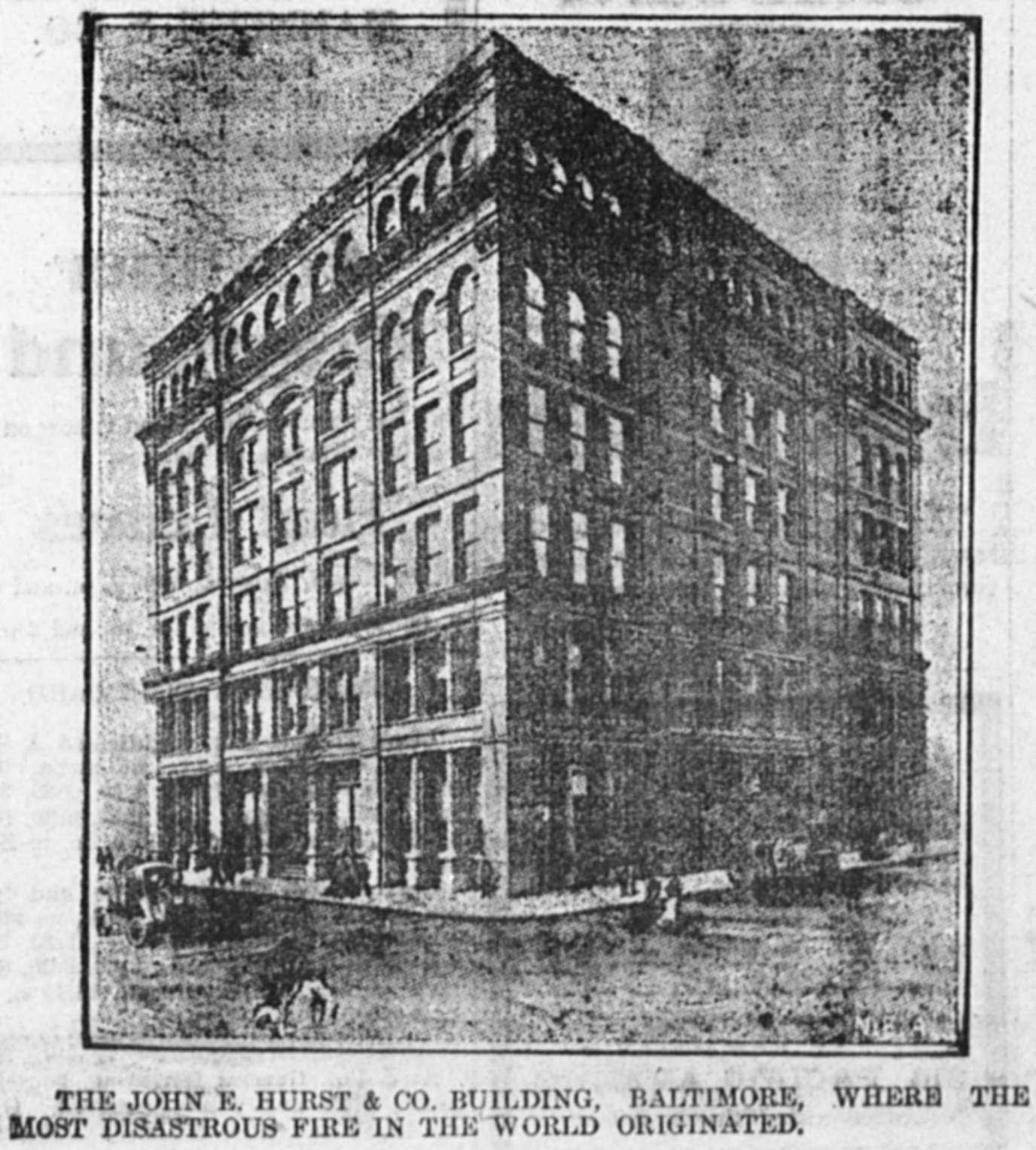
John E. Hurst Building, site of the fire's outbreak

Fire was reported first at the John Hurst and Company building on West German Street at Hopkins Place (modern site at the southwest corner of the Baltimore Civic Center of 1962, currently the CFG Bank Arena) in the western downtown at 10:48 a.m. on Sunday, February 7, and quickly spread. Soon, it became apparent that the fire was outstripping the ability of the city's firefighting resources to fight it, and calls for help were telegraphed to other cities. By 1:30 p.m., units from Washington, D.C. were arriving on the Baltimore and Ohio Railroad at Camden Street Station. To halt the fire, officials decided to use a firebreak, and dynamited buildings around the existing fire. This tactic, however, proved unsuccessful. Not until 5:00 p.m. the next day was the fire brought under control, after burning for thirty hours.

One reason for the fire's duration was the lack of national standards in firefighting equipment. Fire crews and fire engines came from as far away as Philadelphia and Washington that day (units from New York City were blocked by a train accident; they arrived the next day – Monday, February 8). The crews brought their own equipment. Most could only watch helplessly after discovering that their hoses could not connect to Baltimore's gauge size of water hydrants, although a machine shop in the Locust Point area of the city did start making coupling rings to overcome this problem. High winds and freezing temperatures further contributed to the fire's extent and firefighters' difficulties. As a result, the fire burned over 30 hours, destroying 1,545 buildings spanning 70 city blocks—amounting to over 140 acres (57 ha).

While Baltimore was criticized for its hydrants, this problem was not uniquely its own. During that era, American cities used more than six hundred different sizes and variations of fire hose couplings. As outside firefighters returned to their home cities, newspapers published interviews that condemned Baltimore and exaggerated locals' response during the crisis. In addition, many newspapers published accounts by travelers who, in actuality, had only seen the fire as their trains passed through Baltimore. Nonetheless, the responding agencies and their equipment did prove useful, since the uncoupleable hoses only represented a small part of the transported equipment. Ultimately, the tragedy led to the standardization of hydrants nationwide.

In addition to firefighters, outside police officers, the Maryland National Guard, and the Naval Brigade were utilized during the fire to maintain order and protect the city. Police and soldiers not only kept looters away, but also prevented civilians from inadvertently interfering with firefighting efforts. The Naval Brigade secured the waterfront and waterways to keep spectators away. Officers from Philadelphia and New York also assisted the City Police Department.

Thomas Albert Lurz (b. January 9, 1874), a Baltimore native and letter carrier with the U.S. Post Office, rescued tons of mail from the burning Central Post Office on the east side of Battle Monument Square, on North Calvert Street, between East Lexington and Fayette Streets. Lurz gathered a group of men who loaded bags of mail onto horsedrawn wagons, took them to North and Pennsylvania Avenues, and stood guard until the Maryland National Guard arrived (for which he later received a commendation). Meanwhile, back at the General Post Office, employees spraying water on the building's sides and roof, which minimized damage and saved the 1889 Italian Renaissance edifice with its nine towers and central tall clock tower (later razed and replaced by the current 1932 building, later converted to city use as Courthouse East).

== Aftermath ==
In the aftermath, 35,000 people were left unemployed. Over $150 million (in 1904 USD) worth of damage was done, which is approximately $5.7 billion in 2026 dollars.

Immediately after the fire, The Baltimore News quoted Mayor Robert McLane: "To suppose that the spirit of our people will not rise to the occasion is to suppose that our people are not genuine Americans. We shall make the fire of 1904 a landmark not of decline but of progress." McLane then refused assistance, "As head of this municipality, I cannot help but feel gratified by the sympathy and the offers of practical assistance which have been tendered to us. To them I have in general terms replied, 'Baltimore will take care of its own, thank you.'"

Two years later, on September 10, 1906, The Sun reported that the city had risen from the ashes and that "One of the great disasters of modern time had been converted into a blessing."

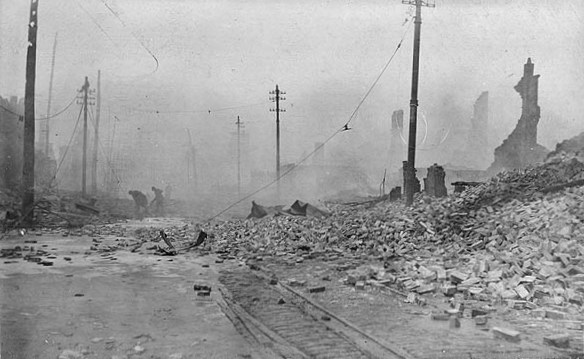
Great Baltimore Fire of 1904, looking West from East Pratt and North Gay Streets

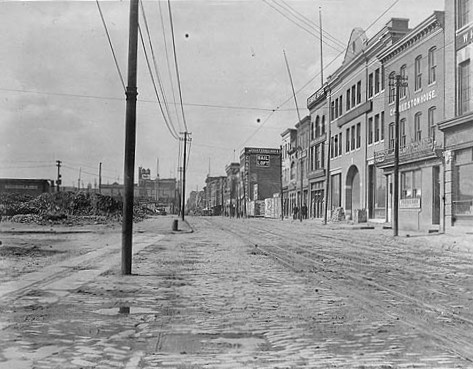
Same view in 1906, 2 years after the fire

Most agreed that the Great Fire directly caused no deaths. An autobiography written by Alice Mae Cawthorne tells of a couple named Mr. and Mrs. Chambre who lost their twin daughters in the Baltimore fire. There are also reports of a merchant suffering a heart attack while evacuating goods from his store. It may be that deaths were not recorded accurately. In 1907 a bronze historical marker commemorating "The Great Fire" was placed next to the main western entrance of the "Wholesale Fish Market" (now the Port Discovery children's museum), one of three new adjoining Centre Market structures replacing the old burned second "Centre Market" building and Maryland Institute of 1851. Since the late 1980s, the structure has been renamed the Port Discovery children's museum. This major commemorative tablet reads "Lives Lost: None." However, a recently rediscovered newspaper story from The Sun tells of the charred remains of a "colored man" being pulled, almost two weeks after the fire, from the harbor basin, near the modern Inner Harbor area USS Constellation Dock (old Pier 2).

Five lost lives were indirectly attributed to the fire. Two members of the 4th Regiment of the Maryland National Guard, Private John Undutch of Company 'F', and Second Lieutenant John V. Richardson of Company 'E', both fell ill and died of pneumonia. Fireman Mark Kelly and Fire Lieutenant John A. McKnew also died of pneumonia and tuberculosis due to exposure during the Great Fire. Martin Mullin, the proprietor of Mullin's Hotel (on the northwest corner of West Baltimore and North Liberty Streets, above Hopkins Place), a block to the north of the John E. Hurst Building, where the fire started, also later died.

Mayor McLane's mysterious and sudden death later that year, ruled a suicide, was also attributed by some of his contemporaries to the stress of post-fire reconstruction.

== Legacy ==
As a result of the fire, Baltimore finally adopted a city building code after seventeen nights of hearings and multiple City Council reviews. The city's downtown "Burnt District" was rebuilt using more fireproof materials, such as granite pavers. Public pressure, coupled with demands of companies insuring the newly re-built buildings, spurred the effort.

The National Fire Protection Association adopted a national standard for fire hydrant and hose connections. However, inertia remained. Conversion was slow and still remains incomplete. One hundred years after the Baltimore Fire, only 18 of the 48 most populous American cities were reported to have national standard fire hydrants. Hose incompatibility contributed to the Oakland firestorm of 1991: although the standard hose coupling has 2.5 inches (64 mm) diameter, Oakland's hydrants had 3-inch (76 mm) couplings.

H. L. Mencken, future famed columnist/commentator/author and linguist, survived the fire at the beginning of his blossoming journalism and literary career, but the offices of his newspaper, the Baltimore Herald (at the northwest corner of St. Paul and East Fayette Streets), were destroyed on the northern edge of the "Burnt District". Mencken related the fire and its aftermath near the end of the second volume of his autobiographical trilogy, Newspaper Days: 1899–1906, published 1941, "When I came out of it at last I was a settled and indeed almost a middle-aged man, spavined by responsibility and aching in every sinew, but I went into it a boy, and it was the hot gas of youth that kept me going."

The Herald printed an edition the first night of the fire on the press of The Washington Post, in exchange for providing photographs to The Post, but could not continue this arrangement because of a long-standing arrangement between The Washington Post and the Baltimore Evening News. For the next five weeks The Herald was printed nightly on the press of the Philadelphia Evening Telegraph and transported 100 miles (160 km) to Baltimore on a special train, provided free of charge by the B&O Railroad. The fire also devastated the city's other major newspapers, including The Sun with its famous "Iron Building", considered the forerunner of modern steel skyscrapers, built 1851 at East Baltimore Street. Across the intersecting South Street-Guilford Avenue was the publishing headquarters of the Baltimore Evening News, founded 1871 and built in 1873 with its mansard roof and corner clock tower. Baltimore's oldest news publication, The Baltimore American (dating back to 1773 or 1796 by various accounts and owned and published by local civic titan, General Felix Agnus), was also burnt out of its offices and forced to have papers printed out-of-town and shipped back by train.

The "Box 414 Association", which has assisted the Baltimore City Fire Department for many years, acts like a local American Red Cross, or military United Service Organization (USO), sending refreshments and break-time trucks to the sites of major alarms and fires to provide exhausted firefighters some comfort and snacks. It is named after the first alarm box pulled on the morning of Sunday, February 7, 1904.

The BCFD memorializes the fire annually at the bronze statue of a firefighter at the Department's old headquarters, facing City Hall, the War Memorial Building and the broad ceremonial plaza in between at East Lexington and North Gay Streets. Observances are also held at the closest street corner to the Great Fire's beginnings at South Howard and West Lombard Streets alongside the old Civic Center/Arena. The Maryland Historical Society commemorated the fire's centennial in 2004 with a website, two books and various events, lectures, and tours through the auspices of the Fire Museum of Maryland on York Road in Lutherville-Timonium-Cockeysville in Baltimore County. Several commemorative stories and special sections were published during the month in Baltimore's only remaining daily newspaper, The Baltimore Sun, and the four local television stations' and several documentaries and interviews/discussion programs on the city's public radio network (NPR) station, WYPR-FM, also commemorated the event.

The folk song "Baltimore Fire" by Charlie Poole and the North Carolina Ramblers, recorded on Columbia Records (15509-D, May 6, 1929) also commemorates the event.

Fire!, fire!, I heard the cry
From every breeze that passes by
All the world was one sad cry of pity
Strong men in anguish prayed
Calling out to the heavens for aid
While the fire in ruins was laid
Fair Baltimore, the beautiful city

More recently, the Baltimore-based rock band J. Roddy Walston and the Business memorialized the fire in "Nineteen Ought Four", on their album Hail Mega Boys.

== See also ==
- List of fires
