= Richard D. Steuart =

American journalist (1880–1951)

Richard D. Steuart (1880–1951) was a journalist in Baltimore, Maryland known as Carroll Dulaney, the name he used for his Day by Day column in the Baltimore News-Post. Steuart was also an historian focusing mainly on Maryland history and the role that Maryland played during the American Civil War. He maintained a vast collection of Civil war era firearms and assorted artifacts, many collected personally from the battlefields he visited. Much of his collection of Confederate-made edged weapons, long arms, side arms, projectiles and fuses, and accouterments were donated to the Virginia Historical Society in 1948.

Richard Steuart also contributed indirectly to the formation of Time Magazine. While he was contributing editor of the Baltimore News Post Mr. Steuart employed a young journalist by the name of Briton Hadden. Mr. Hadden had the idea to start news magazine of his own so Mr. Steuart granted him a leave of absence from the Baltimore News-Post with the promise that if the magazine should not work out that he could return to Baltimore and have his position back.

Upon his death, Richard D. Steuart was eulogized by both Maryland's Governor Theodore McKeldin and Baltimore City's Mayor Thomas D’Alessandro. His vast collection of news clippings and historical library was donated to the Maryland Historical Society.

Work Cited:
