= The Baltimore Sun =

American daily broadsheet newspaper

- Light for All

- Front page on March 27, 2024, after the Francis Scott Key Bridge collapse
- Type: Daily newspaper
- Format: Broadsheet
- Owner(s): JTF Publications LLC (David D. Smith and Armstrong Williams)
- Publisher: Trif Alatzas
- Editor: Trif Alatzas
- Founded: May 17, 1837; 189 years ago
- Headquarters: 200 St. Paul Place, Baltimore, Maryland, U.S.
- City: Baltimore, Maryland, U.S.
- Country: United States
- Circulation: 11,800 daily (as of 2026); 85,000 digital subscribers
- ISSN: 1930-8965
- OCLC number: 244481759
- Website: www.baltimoresun.com

The Baltimore Sun is the largest general-circulation daily newspaper based in the U.S. state of Maryland and provides coverage of local, regional, national, and international news.

Founded in 1837, the newspaper was owned by Tribune Publishing until May 2021, when it was acquired by Alden Global Capital, which operates its media properties through Digital First Media. David D. Smith, the executive chairman of Sinclair Broadcast Group, closed a deal to buy the paper on January 15, 2024. Under Smith's ownership, the paper has shifted to become politically conservative, and has seen large staff departures and declines in readership.

== History ==
=== 19th century ===
The Sun was founded on May 17, 1837, by Arunah Shepherdson Abell and two associates, William Moseley Swain from Rhode Island, and Azariah H. Simmons from Philadelphia, where they had started and published the Public Ledger the year before.

Abell became a journalist with the Providence Patriot and later worked with newspapers in New York City and Boston.

=== 20th century ===
The Abell family and descendants owned The Sun until 1910, when the local Black and Garrett families invested in the paper at the suggestion of former rival owner/publisher of The News, Charles H. Grasty, and they, along with Grasty gained a controlling interest; they retained the name A. S. Abell Company for the parent publishing company. That same year The Evening Sun was established under reporter, editor and columnist H.L. Mencken (1880–1956).

From 1947 to 1986, The Sun was the owner and founder of Maryland's first television station, WMAR-TV (channel 2), which was a longtime affiliate of CBS until 1981, when it switched to NBC. The station was sold off in 1986, and is now owned by the E. W. Scripps Company, and has been an ABC affiliate since 1995. A. S. Abell also owned several radio stations, but not in Baltimore itself (holding construction permits for WMAR sister AM/FM stations, but never bringing them to air).

The newspaper opened its first foreign bureau in London in 1924. Between 1955 and 1961, it added four new foreign offices.

As Cold War tensions grew, it set up shop in Bonn, West Germany, in February 1955; the bureau was later moved to Berlin. Eleven months later, The Sun was one of the first U.S. newspapers to open a bureau in Moscow. A Rome office followed in July 1957, and a New Delhi bureau was opened four years later, in 1961 . At its height, The Sun ran eight foreign bureaus, giving rise to its boast in a 1983 advertisement that "The Sun never sets on the world."

The paper was sold by Reg Murphy in 1986 to the Times-Mirror Company of the Los Angeles Times.

The same week, a 115-year-old rivalry ended when the oldest newspaper in the city, the News American, a Hearst paper since the 1920s with roots dating back to 1773, folded. A decade later in 1997, The Sun acquired the Patuxent Publishing Company, a local suburban newspaper publisher that had a stable of 15 weekly papers and a few magazines in several communities and counties.

In the 1990s and 2000s, The Sun began cutting back its foreign coverage. In 1995 and 1996, the paper closed its Tokyo, Mexico City and Berlin bureaus. Two more—Beijing and London—fell victim to cost-cutting in 2005. The final three foreign bureaus—Moscow, Jerusalem, and Johannesburg, South Africa—fell a couple of years later. All were closed by 2008, as the Tribune Co. streamlined and downsized the newspaper chain's foreign reporting. Some material from The Sun's foreign correspondents is archived at the University of Maryland, Baltimore County.

=== 21st century ===
In the 21st century, The Sun, like most legacy newspapers in the United States, has suffered a number of setbacks in the competition with Internet and other sources, including a decline in readership and ads, a shrinking newsroom staff, and competition from 2005 to 2007 with the free daily The Baltimore Examiner, along with a similar Washington, D.C.–based publication of a small chain recently started by new owners that took over the San Francisco Examiner. In 2000, the Times-Mirror company was purchased by the Tribune Company of Chicago. In 2014, it transferred its newspapers, including The Sun, to Tribune Publishing.

The Sun introduced a new layout design in September 2005, and again in August 2008. By 2010 daily circulation as of 2010 had fallen to 195,561 and 343,552 for the Sunday edition. On April 29, 2009, the Tribune Company announced the lay off of 61 of the 205 staff members in the Sun newsroom. On September 23, 2011, it was reported that the Baltimore Sun would be moving its web edition behind a paywall starting October 10, 2011.

The Baltimore Sun is the flagship of the Baltimore Sun Media Group, which also produces the b free daily newspaper and more than 30 other Baltimore metropolitan-area community newspapers, magazines and Web sites. BSMG content reaches more than one million Baltimore-area readers each week and is the region's most widely read source of news.

On February 20, 2014, The Baltimore Sun Media Group announced that they would buy the alternative weekly City Paper. In April, the Sun acquired the Maryland publications of Landmark Media Enterprises.

In February 2021, as part of the planned merger between Tribune Publishing and Alden Global Capital, Tribune announced that Alden had reached a non-binding agreement to sell The Sun to the Sunlight For All Institute, a nonprofit backed by businessman and philanthropist Stewart W. Bainum Jr. The deal was contingent on approval by Tribune shareholders of the merger deal. It fell apart in talks over operating agreements with Tribune for functions including human resources and customer service. Bainum then led a failed bid to acquire all of Tribune Publishing. Bainum subsequently founded The Baltimore Banner, pledging $50 million to the nonprofit outlet.

In February 2022, the editorial board of The Sun published a lengthy apology for its racism over its 185–year history, including specific offenses such as accepting classified ads for selling enslaved people and publishing editorials that promoted racial segregation and disenfranchisement of Black voters.

==== Acquisition by David Smith ====
In January 2024, David D. Smith, executive chairman of Sinclair Broadcast Group, reached an agreement to acquire the paper, with conservative commentator Armstrong Williams holding an undisclosed stake. Though the transaction was independent of Sinclair, Smith said he foresaw partnerships between the paper and Sinclair properties like its flagship station, Fox affiliate WBFF-TV (channel 45). Smith said he believed he could grow subscriptions and advertising through a greater focus on community news and integrating technology in ways other print media publishers are not doing. In his first visit to the newsroom, he sparred with reporters and said the paper should emulate WBFF's news philosophy, including through non-scientific reader polls and aggressive coverage of Baltimore City Public Schools. He dismissed newsroom concerns about the future of public service journalism. Current and recently departed Baltimore Sun reporters told the Neiman Foundation for Journalism in November 2024 that in the months since Smith's purchase, he has continued to tell journalists that he doesn't read stories published in their paper beyond just the headline, and has neither pitched specific stories nor openly criticized the paper's coverage of stories. In December 2024, Smith told Sun photographer Amy Davis that he had begun reading The Baltimore Sun.

Since Smith's acquisition of The Baltimore Sun, the paper has become more conservative, and has published more stories on Baltimore mayor Brandon Scott and his administration, as well as crime in Baltimore. The paper has also republished content from WBFF, also owned by Smith, the conservative news wire The Center Square, columns written by Smith's daughter, and features on new restaurants opened by Atlas Restaurant Group, which is owned by Smith's nephew. According to industry figures and reporting by The Baltimore Banner, readership of the newspaper fell by nearly half in the first year of Smith's acquisition and the Baltimore Sun's website had fewer unique visitors to its website than in the year before. At least 20 journalists left the company, with many citing concerns they held over the way stories about juvenile crime and city government in Baltimore were written, and other reporters leaving to work for The Baltimore Banner.

Williams said the paper's editorial page would cease endorsing political candidates and start including more conservative viewpoints, but not at the expense of liberal ones. He said at the time that the newspaper may run his syndicated column "on its merits." The paper's opinion page now regularly publishes Wiliiams' columns and video commentaries. In June 2024, The Sun began republishing content from channel 45's website, provoking protests from staffers and the Baltimore Sun Guild, which released a statement expressing concern with the lack of transparency at the paper on the relationship between The Baltimore Sun, Fox45 and other Sinclair newsrooms, and criticizing language used in the station's articles and Williams' editorial articles, particularly toward immigrants and transgender people.

In June 2024, longtime managing editor Sam Davis announced he would retire at the end of the month. Opinion editor Tricia Bishop, who has worked for the newspaper since 1999, would succeed him, with Davis staying on for a few months as a consultant for The Baltimore Sun's owners. The Sun's primary obituary writer, Frederick N. Rasmussen, who worked at the paper for 51 years and wrote thousands of obituaries, resigned in January 2025 over the direction of management.

On June 10, 2024, the Baltimore Sun Guild raised concern with what it said were ethical breaches committed by management since the takeover, including the use of Fox 45's content and Williams columns that did not meet Sun editorial standards. This included language used to describe immigrants and transgender people. The guild demanded the Sun stop republishing WBFF-TV content and asked management to meet with staff to discuss their concerns. Williams said in a statement he respected the guild's opinion but hoped the union "reciprocally appreciates legitimate managerial prerogatives in the journalistic enterprise". In a subsequent Sun column, Williams wrote the guild and the Associated Press had no inherent authority to prescribe the way in which language is used. Despite this, the wording used to describe immigrants in one republished Fox 45 story was eventually changed.

The Baltimore Sun Guild has also raised concerns with the new ownership's efforts to stall contract negotiations with the paper's unionized reporters, with some employees handing out fliers at restaurants owned by David Smith's nephew, Alex, calling Smith a "union buster". Smith denied these accusations, telling Sun photographer Amy Davis that he had multiple union employees across the country and that he'd been negotiating with unions for fifty years, despite employee testimony that Smith threatened to shut down WBFF-TV after its employees started talking about forming a union. Smith also dismissed Davis's concerns that management was proposing union-busting clauses in negotiations, including the ability to terminate employees without just cause, saying, "Nobody does that. There are laws to protect people from that". In September 2025, The Baltimore Sun's management proposed a new contract to its union employees that included a gag rule prohibiting Guild members from making "false or disparaging statements" about the paper's management or ownership, blaming disparaging statements made by the Baltimore Sun Guild for the paper's circulation drop. Since proposing the gag rule, management has refused to continue bargaining with the Baltimore Sun Guild, calling their latest contract their "last, best, and final offer".

Following the Sun's acquisition, one of its arts reporters asked Smith if she should look for a new job amid his acquisition. Smith avoided the reporter's question and instead discussed his past as a "world-class furniture builder" and a photographer. In October 2024, the newspaper eliminated its features desk and reassigned its three reporters to news departments. The guild said in a statement that it would be the first time since 1888 that the paper would be without coverage of the city's cultural life. In February 2026, the guild criticized the paper's management for publishing AI-generated news stories providing analyses of Maryland governor Wes Moore's State of the State Address and President Donald Trump's social media posts, branding the stories as "AI slop".

In April 2026, Semafor reported that The Sun had brought on a team of investigators from WBFF-TV to comb through Moore's records, including his military record as well as his high school and collegiate basketball tenure, as Moore ran for re-election in 2026 and was viewed as a potential candidate in the 2028 United States presidential election. According to records shared by Moore's office with Semafor, the investigative team had grown frustrated with what they felt was Moore's reluctance to share records about his records, prompting Drew Sullins, one of the investigators, to send an email to Moore's communications director, David Turner, accusing Moore and his communications team of "failing repeatedly to answer the most basic questions about his time in the Army and his deployment to Afghanistan". After another investigator, Sean Lawlor, responded to Sullins's email with "That's a hammer!" while accidentally including Moore's team on the reply, prompting several email addresses to attempt to "recall" and unsend Lawlor's email, including Smith, who had not been visibly included on the original emails. Politico reported that current and former staff told Semafor that the paper's new mandate was "to expose fraud and misdeeds among Democratic politicians in the state" and that "David Smith, the Trump ally and longtime Sinclair steward, has been deeply involved in the team’s coverage". In an interview later that month, Moore called the Sun's investigation into his military career "not legitimate" and criticized Smith and other "MAGA billionaires" for using local press like their personal Twitter accounts. Moore also said that Smith should "really be careful about throwing stones", adding that Smith had a pretty sketchy history himself.

== Editions ==
Microfilm scan of The Evening Sun from September 20, 1988, a young Tupac Shakur can be seen at the left.

From 1910 to 1995 there were two distinct newspapers, The Sun, which was published in the morning, and The Evening Sun, which was published in the afternoon. Each newspaper maintained separate reporting and editorial staff.

The Evening Sun was first published in 1910 under the leadership of Charles H. Grasty, former owner of the Evening News, and a firm believer in the evening circulation. For most of its existence, The Evening Sun led its morning sibling in circulation. In 1959, the afternoon edition's circulation was 220,174, compared to 196,675 for the morning edition. However, by the 1980s, cultural, technological and economic shifts in America were eating away at afternoon newspapers' market share, with readers flocking to either morning papers or switching to nightly television news broadcasts. In 1992, the afternoon paper's circulation was 133,800. By mid-1995, The Evening Sun's readership—86,360—had been eclipsed by that of The Sun—264,583. The Evening Sun ceased publication on September 15, 1995.

=== Daily ===
After a period of roughly a year during which the paper's owners sometimes printed a two-section product, The Baltimore Sun now has three sections every weekday: News, Sports and alternating various business and features sections. On some days, comics and such features as the horoscope and TV listings are printed in the back of the Sports section.

After dropping the standalone business section in 2009, The Sun brought back a business section on Tuesdays and Sundays in 2010, with business pages occupying part of the news section on other days. Features sections debuting in 2010 included a Saturday "Home" section, a Thursday "Style" section and a Monday section called "Sunrise." The sports article written by Peter Schmuck is published only on weekdays.

=== Sunday ===
The Sunday Sun for many years was noted for a locally produced rotogravure Maryland pictorial magazine section, featuring works by such acclaimed photographers as A. Aubrey Bodine. The Sunday Sun dropped the Sunday Sun Magazine in 1996 and now only carries Parade magazine weekly. A quarterly version of the Sun Magazine was resurrected in September 2010, with stories that included a comparison of young local doctors, an interview with actress Julie Bowen and a feature on the homes of a former Baltimore anchorwoman. Newsroom managers plan to add online content on a more frequent basis.

=== baltimoresun.com ===
The company introduced its website in September 1996. A redesign of the site was unveiled in June 2009, capping a six-month period of record online traffic. Each month from January through June, an average of 3.5 million unique visitors combined to view 36.6 million web pages. Sun reporters and editors produce more than three dozen blogs on such subjects as technology, weather, education, politics, Baltimore crime, real estate, gardening, pets and parenting. Among the most popular are Dining@Large, which covers local restaurants; The Schmuck Stops Here, a Baltimore-centric sports blog written by Peter Schmuck; Z on TV, by media critic David Zurawik; and Midnight Sun, a nightlife blog. A Baltimore Sun iPhone app was released on September 14, 2010.

=== b ===
In 2008, the Baltimore Sun Media Group launched the daily paper b to target younger and more casual readers, ages 18 to 35. It was in tabloid format, with large graphics, creative design, and humor in focusing on entertainment, news, and sports. Its companion website was bthesite.com. The paper transitioned from daily to weekly publication in 2011.

b ceased publication entirely in August 2015, more than a year after the Baltimore Sun Media Group acquired City Paper.

== Contributors ==
The Baltimore Sun has won 16 Pulitzer Prizes. It also has been home to many notable journalists, reporters and essayists, including H.L. Mencken, who had a forty-plus-year association with the paper.

Other notable journalists, editors, photographers and cartoonists on the staff of The Baltimore Sun include:

- Rafael Alvarez
- Linda Carter Brinson
- Richard Ben Cramer
- Russell Baker
- A. Aubrey Bodine
- John Carroll
- Turner Catledge
- Edmund Duffy
- Thomas Edsall
- John Filo
- Jon Franklin
- Jack Germond
- James Grant
- Mauritz A. Hallgren
- David Hobby
- Brit Hume
- Gwen Ifill
- Gerald W. Johnson
- Kevin P. Kallaugher
- Murray Kempton
- Frank Kent
- Tim Kurkjian
- Laura Lippman
- William Manchester
- Jim McKay
- Kay Mills
- Robert Mottar
- J. Reginald Murphy
- Thomas O'Neill
- Drew Pearson
- Ken Rosenthal
- Louis Rukeyser
- Dan Shaughnessy
- David Simon
- Michael Sragow
- John Steadman
- Jules Witcover
- William F. Zorzi

== Facilities ==
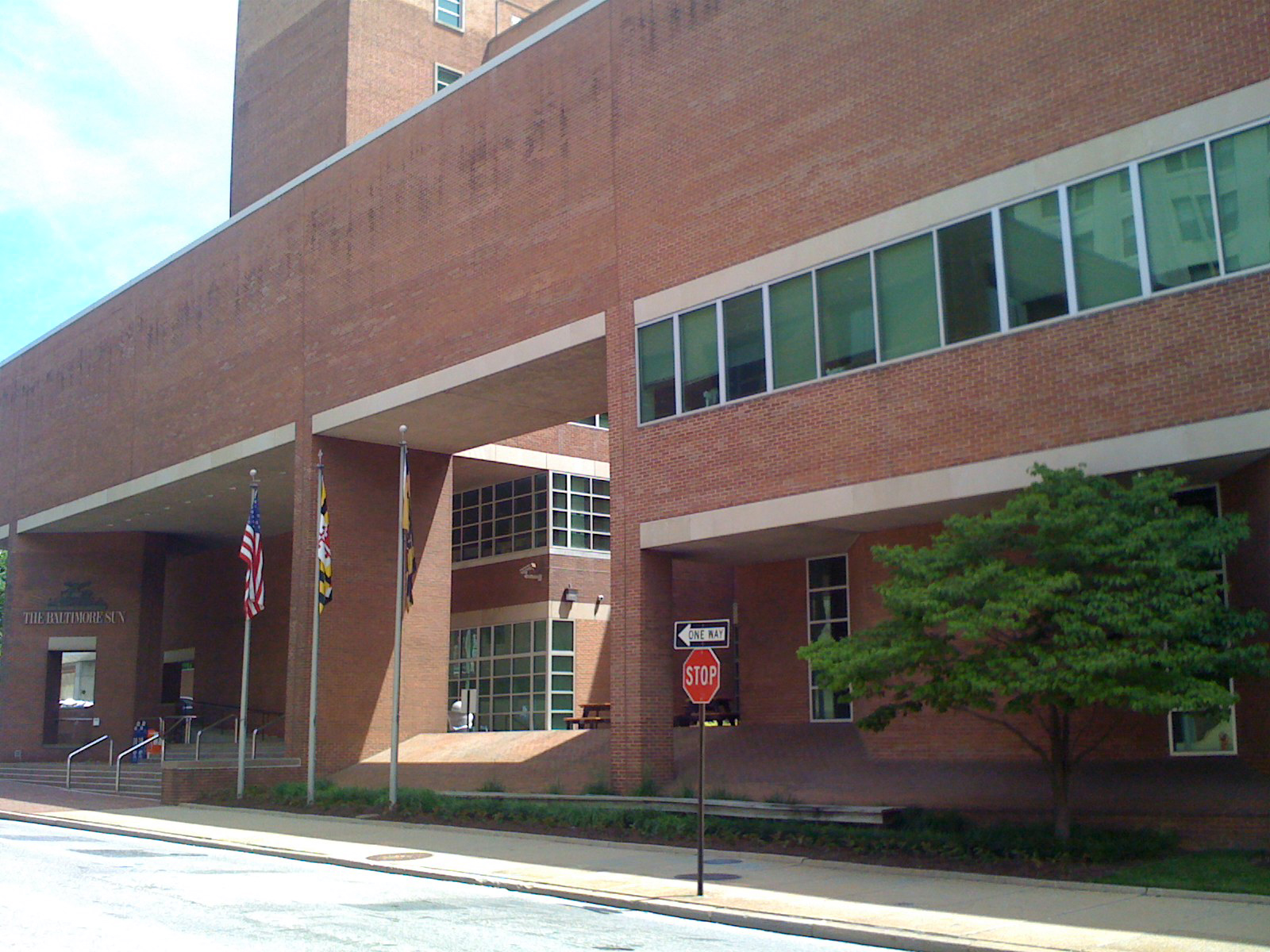
The Baltimore Sun's headquarters, from 1950 to 1988, on North Calvert Street

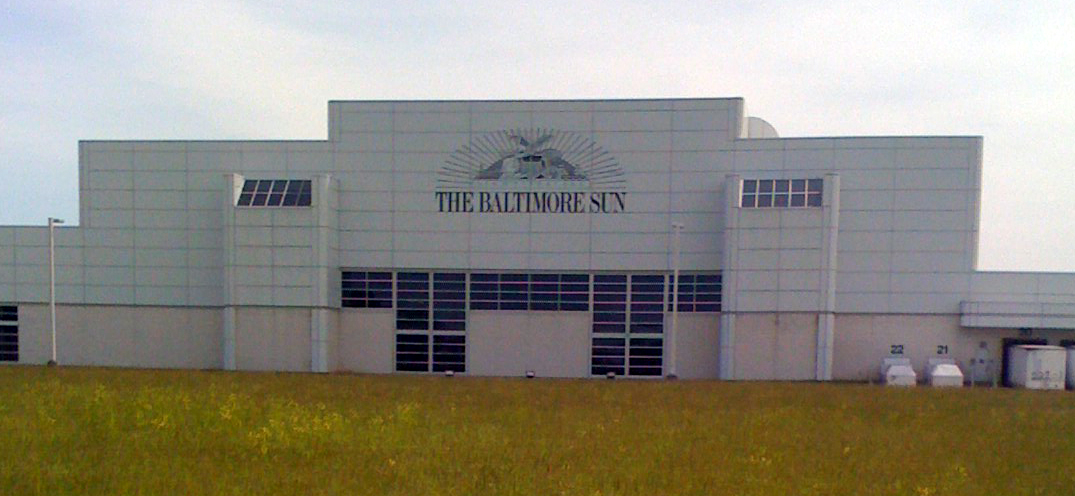
The newspaper's headquarters, between 1988 and 2022, at "Sun Park" in Port Covington

The first issue of The Sun, a four-page tabloid, was printed at 21 Light Street in downtown Baltimore in the mid-1830s.

In 1851, the newspaper moved to a five-story structure at the corner of Baltimore and South streets. In 1904, in the Great Baltimore Fire, the structure, known as the "Iron Building", was destroyed.

In 1885, The Sun constructed a building for its Washington, D.C. bureau at 1317 F Street, NW, in Washington, D.C. The building is on the National Register.

In 1906, operations were moved to Charles and Baltimore streets, where The Sun was written, published, and distributed for nearly 50 years. In 1950, operations were moved to a larger, modern plant at Calvert and Centre streets. In 1979, ground was broken for a new addition to the Calvert Street plant to house modern pressroom facilities. This facility commenced operations in 1981.

In April 1988, at a cost of $180 million, the company purchased 60 acres (24 ha) of land at Port Covington and built "Sun Park". The new building housed a satellite printing and packaging facility, and also is the newspaper's headquarters for its distribution operations. The Sun's printing facility at Sun Park had highly sophisticated computerized presses and automated insertion equipment in the packaging area. To keep pace with the speed of the presses and automated guided vehicles, intelligent electronic forklifts delivered the newsprint to the presses.

On January 30, 2022, The Baltimore Sun newspaper was printed for the last time at its Sun Park facility. It was reported that The Sun's printing operations would be moved to a printing facility in Wilmington, Delaware.

In December 2022, the Sun announced an agreement to move its offices to 200 St. Paul Place in downtown Baltimore, abandoning Sun Park altogether. After The Sun's purchase in 2024, its new owners signaled plans to move the newsroom to the Bagby Building at 509 S. Exeter St. in Little Italy, farther away from city offices and courts. Business and advertising staffers would move to the new office over the next year.

== Controversies ==
- The paper became embroiled in a controversy involving the former governor of Maryland, Robert L. Ehrlich Jr. (R). Ehrlich had issued an executive order on November 18, 2004, banning state executive branch employees from talking to Sun columnist Michael Olesker and reporter David Nitkin, claiming that their coverage had been unfair to the administration. This led The Sun to file a First Amendment lawsuit against the Ehrlich administration. The case was dismissed by a U.S. District Court judge, and The Sun appealed to the 4th U.S. Circuit Court of Appeals, which upheld the dismissal.
- Olesker was later forced to resign on January 4, 2006, in a separate incident in which he was accused of plagiarism. The Baltimore City Paper reported that several of his columns contained sentences or paragraphs that were extremely similar (although not identical) to material published in The Washington Post, The New York Times, and The Sun. Several of his colleagues were highly critical of the forced resignation, taking the view that the use of published boilerplate material was common newsroom practice, and that Olesker's alleged plagiarism was in line with that practice.
- Between 2006 and 2007, Thomas Andrews Drake, a former National Security Agency executive, allegedly leaked classified information to Siobhan Gorman, then a national security reporter for The Sun. Drake was charged in April 2010 with 10 felony counts in relation to the leaks. In June 2011, all 10 original charges were dropped, in what was widely viewed as an acknowledgement that the government had no valid case against the whistleblower, who eventually pleaded to one misdemeanor count for exceeding authorized use of a computer. Drake was the 2011 recipient of the Ridenhour Prize for Truth-Telling.
- In 2018, in response to the European cookie law, the parent company of The Sun did not enable permission-requesting software, and many European visitors (and those from some non-European countries) were forced to visit the site via proxies, potentially muddling the website's analytics.
- On September 10, 2024, the Sun dismissed reporter Maddi O'Neill for raising questions on the newsroom's internal Slack channel about journalistic standards under that year's new ownership. O'Neill, a legal reporter who joined the paper that same year from The Daily Record, was still in her nine-month probationary period and thus could be fired without cause. In a statement, the Baltimore Sun Guild called the firing a "cowardly" decision emblematic of "mismanagement" by the paper's new owners. The union later filed a federal complaint, saying O'Neill was fired for engaging in protected concerted activity.

== Portrayal in The Wire ==
The Baltimore Sun was featured in the American crime drama television series The Wire in 2008 (season 5), which was created by former Sun reporter David Simon.

Like many of the institutions featured in The Wire, the Sun is portrayed as having many deeply dysfunctional qualities while also having very dedicated people on its staff. The season focuses on the role of the media in affecting political decisions in City Hall and the priorities of the Baltimore Police Department. Additionally, the show explores the business pressures of modern media through layoffs and buyouts occurring at the Sun, on the orders of the Tribune Company, the Sun's corporate owner.

One storyline involves a troubled Sun reporter named Scott Templeton, and his escalating tendency to sensationalize and falsify stories. The Wire portrays the managing editors of the Sun as turning a blind eye to the protests of a concerned line editor, in the managing editors' zeal to win a Pulitzer Prize. The show suggests that the motivation for this institutional dysfunction is the business pressures of modern media, and working for a flagship newspaper in a major media market like The New York Times or The Washington Post is seen as the only way to avoid the cutbacks occurring at the Sun.

Season 5 was The Wire's last. The finale episode, "-30-", features a montage at the end portraying the ultimate fate of the major characters. It shows Templeton at Columbia University with the senior editors of the fictional Sun, accepting the Pulitzer Prize, with no mention being made as to the aftermath of Templeton's career. Alma Gutierrez is shown being exiled to the Carroll County bureau past the suburbs.

== News partnership ==
In September 2008, The Baltimore Sun became the newspaper partner of station WJZ-TV, owned and operated by CBS; the partnership involves sharing content and story leads, and teaming up on stories. WJZ promoted Baltimore Sun stories in its news broadcasts. The Sun promoted WJZ's stories and weather team on its pages.

Since the 2024 purchase led by Sinclair chairman David Smith, the paper has partnered with Sinclair flagship WBFF-TV. Their respective websites republish each other's stories and articles from WBFF-TV and other Sinclair outlets appear in the paper. This was a sticking point with the newspaper's union, since the articles sometimes did not meet The Sun's journalistic standards.

== See also ==
- Category:The Baltimore Sun people
- List of newspapers in Maryland
- List of newspapers in the United States by circulation
- Media in Baltimore
