= Felix Agnus =

French/American sculptor, newspaper publisher and soldier

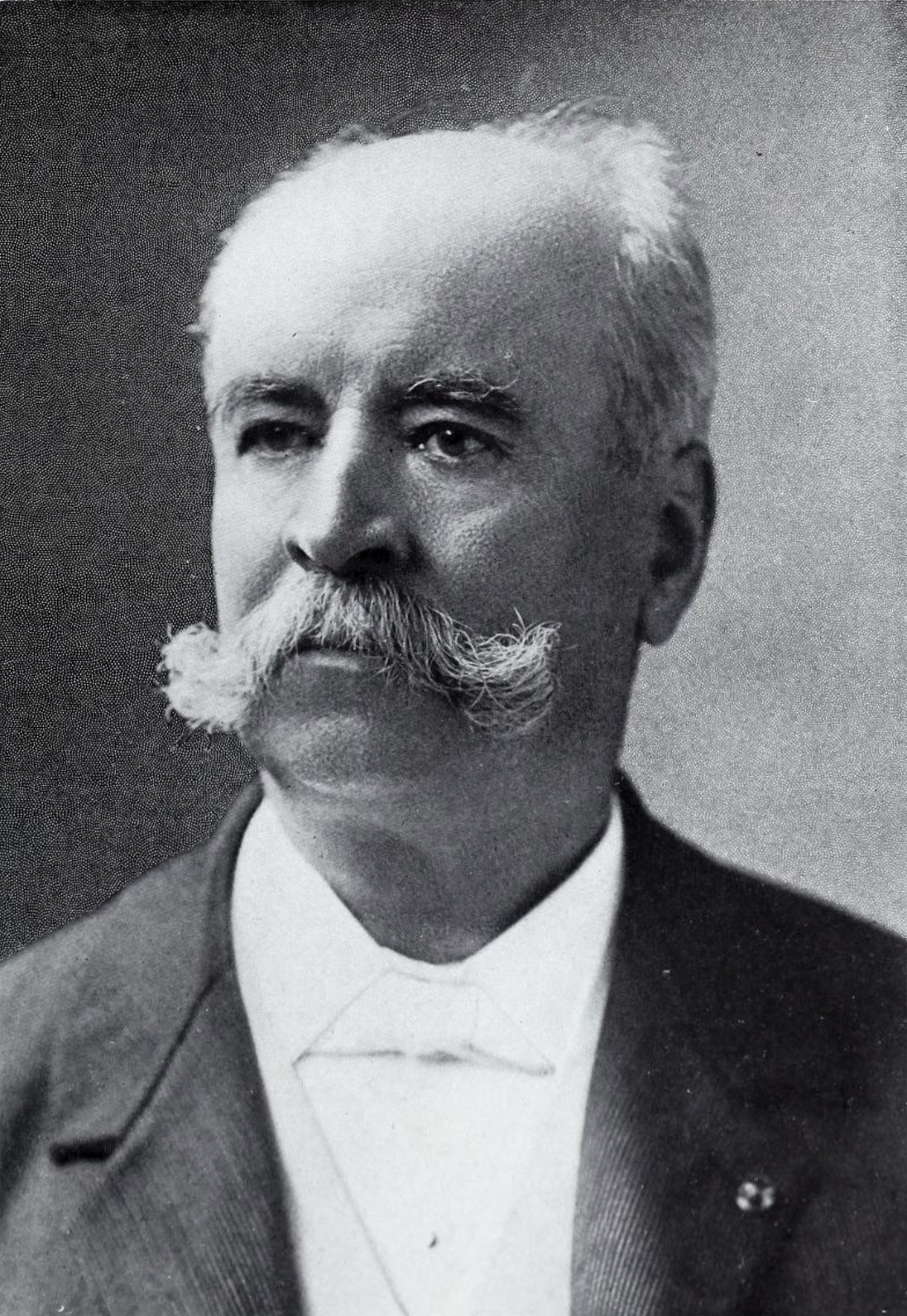
- Agnus in 1914 publication
- Born: 4 July 1839; Lyon, France
- Died: 31 October 1925 (aged 86)
- Buried: Druid Ridge Cemetery, Pikesville, Maryland
- Allegiance: France; United States; Union
- Branch: French Army; Union Army
- Service years: 1859 (France); 1861–1865 (US)
- Rank: Major; Brevet Brigadier General
- Conflicts: Franco-Austrian War; Battle of Montebello; American Civil War; Peninsula campaign; Battle of Gaines' Mill (WIA); Siege of Port Hudson; Shenandoah Valley campaigns; Battle of Opequon; Battle of Fisher's Hill; Second Battle of Winchester; Battle of Cedar Creek
- Awards: Ordre du Nichan El-Anouar
- Children: 2
- Other work: Publisher of the Baltimore American

Felix Agnus (4 May 1839 – 31 October 1925) (born Antoine-Felix) was a French-born sculptor, newspaper publisher and soldier who served in the Franco-Austrian War and the American Civil War. Agnus studied sculpture before enlisting to fight in the Franco-Austrian War. Upon the conclusion of the war, he travelled to the United States and again briefly worked as a sculptor. In 1861, upon the outbreak of the American Civil War, Agnus enlisted in the 5th New York Volunteer Infantry, and served with merit, rising to brevet brigadier-general before being mustered out of service. Agnus was then inspector general of the Department of the South and supervised the dismantling of Confederate forts.

After the war, Agnus settled in Baltimore and worked for the Baltimore American, eventually becoming publisher of the paper. Charles Fulton, the previous publisher, was his father-in-law, Agnus having married Fulton's daughter Annie on 13 December 1864. As the publisher, Agnus was an original member of the Associated Press, and a prominent citizen in Baltimore. He was offered political positions, including as a United States Senator and a United States Consul, both of which he declined. He served on several local and national commissions. Agnus died in 1925. A funerary statue formerly placed on his grave, known as Black Aggie, is the subject of urban legends.

== Early years ==
Felix Agnus was born in Lyon, France, on 4 July 1839, to Felix-Etienne Agnus and Anne née Bernerra Agnus. He was educated at College Jolie Clair, near Paris, and, in 1852, set out on a voyage around the world for four years. Upon returning, Agnus studied sculpting. He abandoned school to fight in the Franco-Austrian War. He served in the 3rd Regiment, and fought in the Battle of Montebello. When the war ended in 1859, he emigrated from France first to Newport, Rhode Island, and later New York City, where he worked for Tiffany and Company.

== Civil War service ==
On 25 April 1861, at the beginning of the Civil War, Agnus enlisted in Duryée's Zouaves. At the Battle of Big Bethel, he saved the life of Captain Judson Kilpatrick, and was soon promoted to sergeant, 2nd lieutenant, and 1st lieutenant. In the Peninsula Campaign, Agnus led the charge at Ashland Bridge, and was severely wounded in the shoulder at the Battle of Gaines's Mill. Duryée's Zouaves were next stationed in Baltimore, Maryland, on Federal Hill, where the wounded Agnus was billeted on Charles C. Fulton, publisher of the Baltimore American. It is surmised that it was during this time that he met his future wife, Fulton's daughter Annie. He helped raise four companies of the 165th New York Infantry Regiment, in which he was given the captaincy of the color company.

In late 1862 his regiment was sent to Louisiana, and garrisoned at New Orleans and Baton Rouge. Captain Agnus was wounded on 27 May 1863, during the siege of Port Hudson, he was promoted to major on 2 September, and for a time had command of his regiment. He served in Texas, and, after attaining the rank of lieutenant-colonel, was ordered eastwards to join the 19th Corps. He served under General Philip Sheridan, taking part in the battles of Opequon, Fisher's Hill, Winchester, and Cedar Creek. His last service was in the Department of the South, as inspector general of the Department, where he was commissioned to dismantle old Confederate forts in South Carolina, Georgia, and Florida, and turn all the property over to the U.S. government. He received the brevet of brigadier-general of volunteers on 13 March 1865, making him the youngest brigadier-general in the army at the time. Agnus was mustered out of service on 22 August 1865.

== Later life and death ==
On resuming civil life he was appointed to assistant assessor in the Internal Revenue Service office in Baltimore. He worked for, and was eventually given charge of the business department of the Baltimore American on 4 July 1869, and later became its publisher. Agnus helped to greatly expand the newspaper. In 1897 the politician George L. Wellington sued Agnus for libel. In 1904, a fire burnt down the headquarters of the American. Agnus found printing facilities in Washington, D.C., and soon began construction on a new, 16 story building. Agnus also founded the Baltimore Star. He sold both newspapers on 1 December 1924, to Frank Munsey.

He was twice asked to be the Republican nominee for a seat in the United States Senate, but declined. Agnus was appointed US Consul to Derry, Ireland, and confirmed by the Senate, but declined to accept the position. He served as the chairman of the Chesapeake and Delaware Canal Commission, a member of the Board of Visitors of West Point and of the commission that built the Baltimore Courthouse. He also was one of the original members of the Associated Press, a delegate to multiple Republican national conventions and a charter member of the Army and Navy Club. Agnus received the Ordre du Nichan El-Anouar. Agnus died on 31 October 1925. A march was written in 1882 by W. Paris Chambers entitled the "General Felix Agnus March".

Black Aggie is the folkloric name given to a statue formerly placed on the grave of Agnus in Druid Ridge Cemetery in Pikesville, Maryland. The statue is of a somber seated figure in a cowl or shroud, and was the subject of many urban legends.

== Dates of rank ==
Insignia	Rank	Component	Date	Ref(s)
	Sergeant	US Volunteers	25 April 1861	
	First sergeant	US Volunteers	20 July 1861	
	Second lieutenant	US Volunteers	1 September 1861	
	First lieutenant	US Volunteers	8 July 1862	
	Captain	US Volunteers	28 November 1862	
	Major	US Volunteers	2 September 1863	
	Brevet Lieutenant-Colonel	US Volunteers	13 March 1865	
	Brevet Colonel	US Volunteers	13 March 1865	
	Brevet Brigadier General	US Volunteers	13 March 1865	

== See also ==
- List of American Civil War brevet generals (Union)

== Sources ==
Attribution
