= Soldiers and Sailors Monument (Nashua, New Hampshire) =

American Civil War monument

Coordinates: 42°45′56″N 71°28′3″W

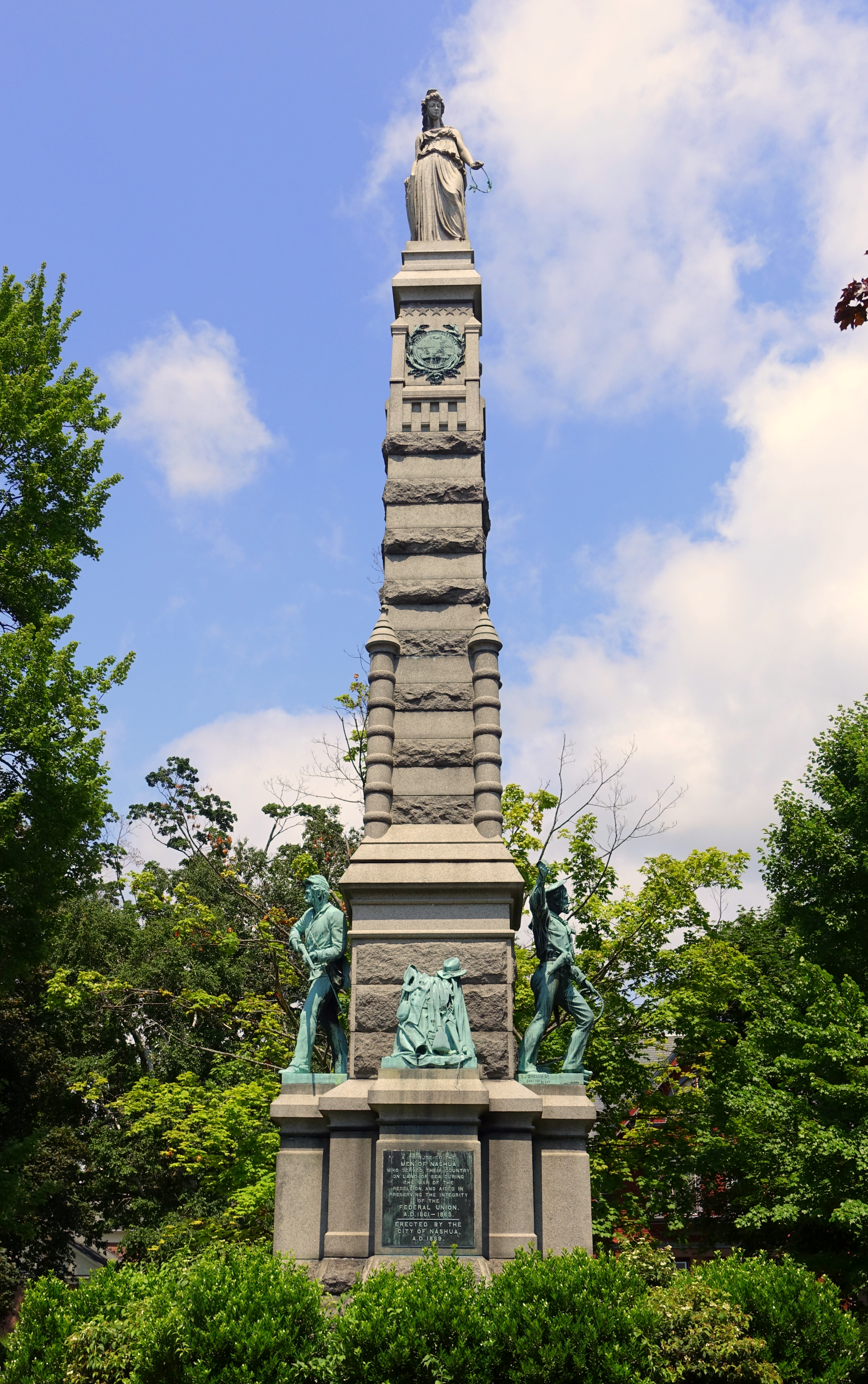
Soldiers and Sailors Monument in Nashua, New Hampshire

The Soldiers and Sailors Monument in Nashua, New Hampshire is an American Civil War memorial. Its cornerstone was laid on May 30, 1889, and the monument dedicated on October 15, 1889. The monument is located in central Nashua within the triangle formed by Concord, Amherst, and Nashville streets.

The monument is a square, castellated column of New Hampshire granite from Nashua on a base of Quincy granite, atop which stands a figure of Victory, dressed in classical Roman garments and holding an American shield and a laurel wreath. Its base is ornamented with bronze statues of a soldier and sailor, and bronze reliefs depicting the Goddess of Liberty overseeing the reconciliation of the South with the North, an emancipation scene with a Union soldier extending a scroll to a kneeling figure, and the sinking of the Alabama by the Kearsarge. At its front is a sculpture of a saddle draped with cavalry clothing and equipment; at the rear is a sculpture of Civil War-era weapons.

The design for the monument was made by T. M. Perry, of Messrs. Frederick & Field, who carved the Victory, erected the monument, and did all its granite work. The sailor was modeled by S. J. O'Kelley and cast by Melzar Hunt Mosman. The soldier was modeled by Caspar Buberl and cast by the Henry Bonnard Bronze Company. The artillery sculpture was made and cast by Melzar Hunt Mosman, as were the Emancipation bas-relief and the two lettered panels. The statue of Victory, cavalry sculpture, and sinking of the Alabama were modeled by Beattie & Brooks.

- On bronze plaque on lower front of monument:

A TRIBUTE TO THE
MEN OF NASHUA
WHO SERVED THEIR COUNTRY
ON LAND OR SEA DURING
THE WAR OF THE
REBELLION, AND AIDED IN PRESERVING THE INTEGRITY
OF THE
FEDERAL UNION.
A.D. 1861-1865.
ERECTED BY THE
CITY OF NASHUA,
A.D. 1889

- On bronze plaque on lower back of base:

"THE UNION OUGHT TO BE CONSIDERED AS
A MAIN PROP OF YOUR LIBERTY, AND THE
LOVE OF THE ONE OUGHT TO ENDEAR TO
YOU THE PRESERVATION OF THE OTHER."
WASHINGTON'S FAREWELL ADDRESS.
"OUR FEDERAL UNION: IT MUST BE PRESERVED."
ANDREW JACKSON.
"LIBERTY AND UNION, NOW AND FOREVER,
ONE AND INSEPARABLE."
DANIEL WEBSTER
"THAT FROM THOSE HONORED DEAD, WE TAKE
INCREASED DEVOTION TO THAT CAUSE FOR
WHICH THEY GAVE THE LAST FULL MEASURE
OF DEVOTION-THAT WE HERE HIGHLY RE-
SOLVE THAT THESE DEAD SHALL NOT HAVE
DIED IN VAIN-AND THAT GOVERNMENT OF
THE PEOPLE, BY THE PEOPLE, FOR THE PEO-
PLE, SHALL NOT PERISH FROM THE EARTH."
ABRAHAM LINCOLN.
"LET US HAVE PEACE and a happy new year
U.S.GRANT

- On relief plaque on base:

WITH MALICE TOWARD NONE
WITH CHARITY FOR ALL

- On relief plaque on base:

SINKING OF THE ALABAMA BY THE KEARSARGE JUNE 19, 1864
