= Melzar Hunt Mosman =

American sculptor

- Born: March 10, 1843; Chicopee, Massachusetts
- Died: January 11, 1926 (aged 82); Chicopee, Massachusetts
- Known for: Sculpture
- Notable work: Revolutionary War Door

Melzar Hunt Mosman (March 10, 1843 – January 11, 1926) was an American sculptor who made a number of Civil War and Spanish–American War monuments in Massachusetts.

== Early life ==
Mosman was born on March 10, 1843, in Chicopee, Massachusetts. His father, Silas Mosman, ran the Ames Manufacturing Company's bronze foundry. The foundry made statues and monuments, including the statue of Benjamin Franklin at Old City Hall and the bronze doors for the east wing of the United States Capitol. The Mosman family had been involved in metal work since they arrived in Massachusetts in 1632.

In 1860 Mosman went to work at Ames, where he produced drawings for presentation swords. He graduated from Chicopee High School in 1862.

== Military service ==
A few weeks after graduating high school, Mosman joined the 46th Massachusetts Infantry, where he saw combat in the Newbern, North Carolina, area. He was transferred to an engineering unit that was tasked with preparing for the Siege of Vicksburg. He mustered out in 1864 after contracting a near fatal fever.

== Sculpting ==
=== Ames Manufacturing Company ===
After the leaving the Union Army, Mosman returned to the Ames foundry, where he cast cannons for use in the war. In 1867 he traveled to Paris to work in a foundry there. He later studied casting methods in Italy and the German Empire.

From 1870 to 1871 he sculpted Westfield, Massachusetts' Civil War Memorial. It was dedicated on May 30, 1871.

On January 9, 1874, Mosman was paid $10,000 by Middletown, Connecticut, to sculpt a Civil War monument.

In 1874, Mosman and his father assisted Daniel Chester French with the minuteman statue at the Old North Bridge in Concord, Massachusetts. The statue was unveiled by President Ulysses S. Grant on the centenary of the Battle of Lexington and Concord (April 19, 1876).

Mosman designed a Civil War monument for Henry E. Hone of Saugus, Massachusetts, which was erected in the rotary at Saugus Center in 1875.

Mosman designed and sculpted Bridgeport, Connecticut's soldiers' monument. The monument was the largest and most expensive in the state and Mosman was said to have received $18,500 for his work. It was dedicated on August 17, 1876.

Mosman designed and cast the Fireman's Monument in Evergreen Cemetery in New Haven, Connecticut, which was dedicated on July 9, 1877.

In 1883 he sculpted Northampton Remembers, bronze statues of a Civil War soldier and sailor that adorn the entrance of Memorial Hall in Northampton, Massachusetts.

=== Chicopee Bronze Works ===
In 1884, Mosman left Ames after a dispute and started his own foundry, the Chicopee Bronze Works.

Mosman did the bronze sculptures (three muskets, a drum, knapsack, cartridge box, and canteen) for the 10th Massachusetts Infantry Monument. The monument marks the position of the 10th Massachusetts Infantry Regiment on the Gettysburg Battlefield on July 3, 1863. It was dedicated on October 6, 1885. That same year, another one of his sculptures, a civil war monument, was erected in Court Square in Springfield, Massachusetts.

Mosman modeled the bronze statues for Brattleboro, Vermont's Civil War Monument. The monument was dedicated on Bunker Hill Day (June 17), 1887.

In 1889, Mosman sculpted the bronze figure for Winchendon, Massachusetts' Civil War Soldiers' Monument. That same year he, Caspar Buberl, and Stephen J. O'Kelly completed Nashua, New Hampshire's Soldiers and Sailors Monument.

From 1901 to 1902, Mosman designed and cast a 7 1/2-foot statue of Walter Harriman that was placed in Warren, New Hampshire.

From 1903 to 1905, the foundry cast Thomas Crawford and William H. Rinehart's Revolutionary War Door for the U.S. Capitol building.

In 1906, Mosman sculpted the Spanish American Veterans Memorial erected by the Friends of the Second Massachusetts Infantry Regiment in Memorial Square, Springfield, Massachusetts.

In 1907, he sculpted Massachusetts, the monument erected in Winchester National Cemetery by the Commonwealth in honor of its soldiers who died in the Shenandoah Valley during the Civil War. That same year the Massachusetts General Court approved funding for a monument to Massachusetts' soldiers in the New Bern National Cemetery. Mosman was chosen by a commission appointed by Governor Curtis Guild, Jr. to design and sculpt the monument.

In 1908, Mosman created the memorial bronze doors for Dartmouth College's Webster Hall.

In addition to casting Mosman's works, Chicopee Bronze Works also cast Anne Whitney's statues of Leif Eriksson (erected in Boston), a Norseman (Milwaukee), and Charles Sumner (Cambridge, Massachusetts), Daniel Chester French's statue of Thomas Starr King (San Francisco), Enoch Wood's statues of Nathan Hale and Thomas Knowlton (both in Hartford), Louis Rebisso's statues of Ulysses S. Grant (Lincoln Park, Chicago), William Henry Harrison (Cincinnati, William Ordway Partridge's statue of Ulysses S. Grant (Brooklyn), Abner Coleman's soldiers' monument (Taunton, Massachusetts), N. C. Matthews' soldiers' monument (Jaffrey, New Hampshire), and Augustus Saint-Gaudens' Abraham Lincoln: The Man. The company founded The Pioneers for the Iowa State Capitol as well. Rebisso's Grant statue was the largest bronze statue cast in the United States.

Chicopee Bronze Works closed around 1911.

== Later life and death ==
After his foundry closed, Mosman worked for Gorham Manufacturing Company and T. F. McGann & Sons Company. At Gorham he sculpted a Spanish–American War monument for Gardner, Massachusetts, and a soldiers and sailors monument for Ebensburg, Pennsylvania. With McGann he worked on Dover, New Hampshire, and Clinton, Lawrence, Winthrop, Revere, Lowell, and Leominster, Massachusetts' Spanish–American War memorials.

Mosman's final work was Chicopee High School's World War I memorial. He died on January 11, 1926, at his home in Chicopee.

== Gallery ==
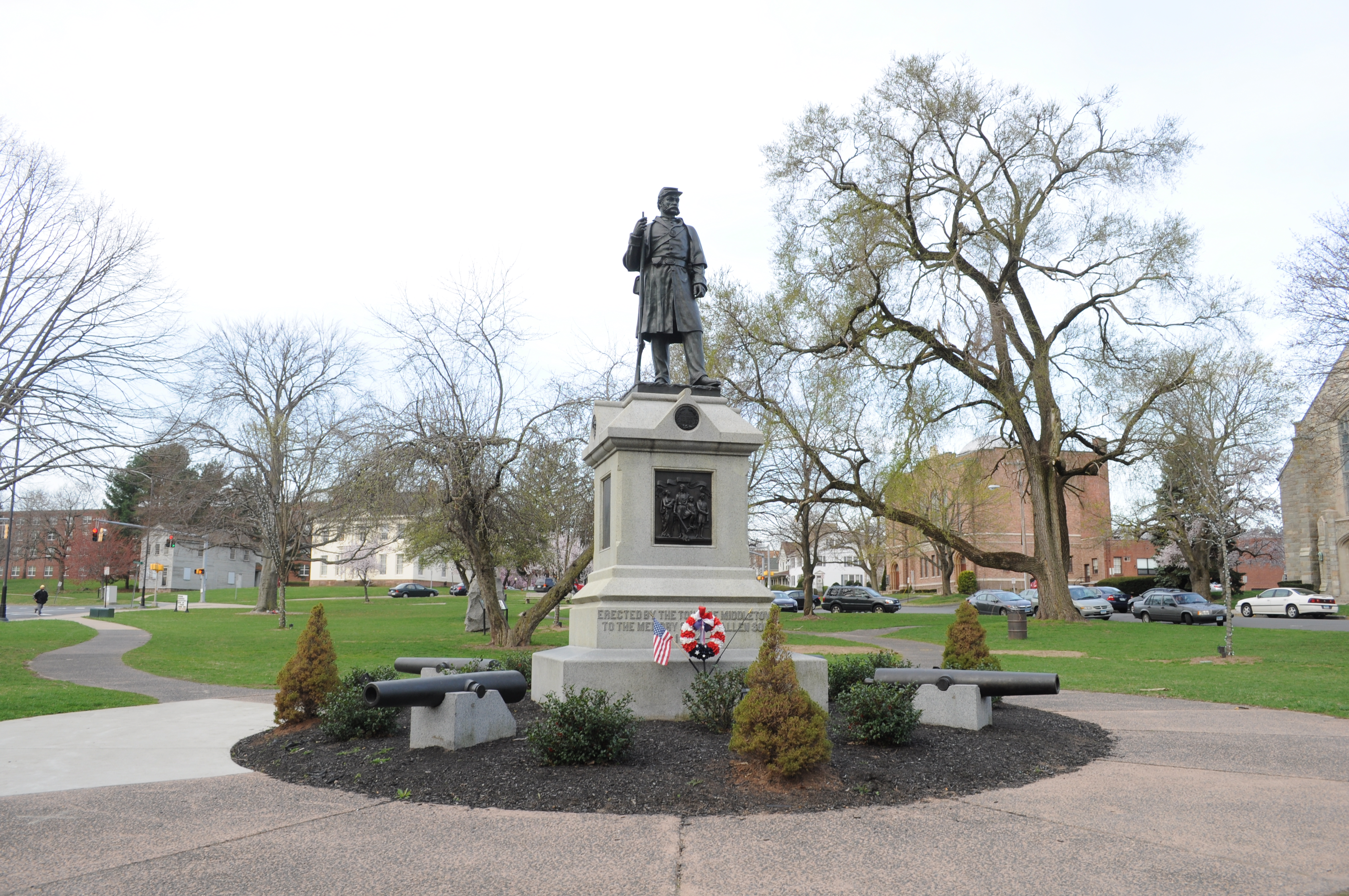
Middletown Soldiers' Monument

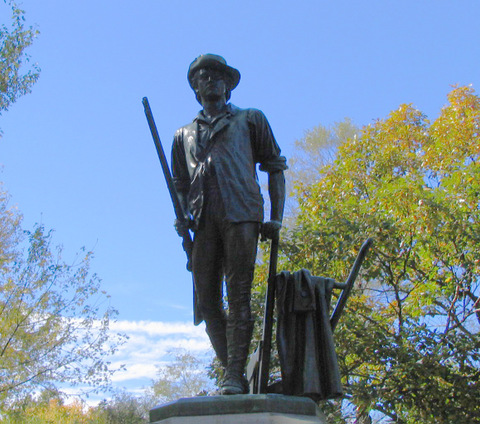
Minuteman Statue, Concord, Massachusetts, by D.C.French

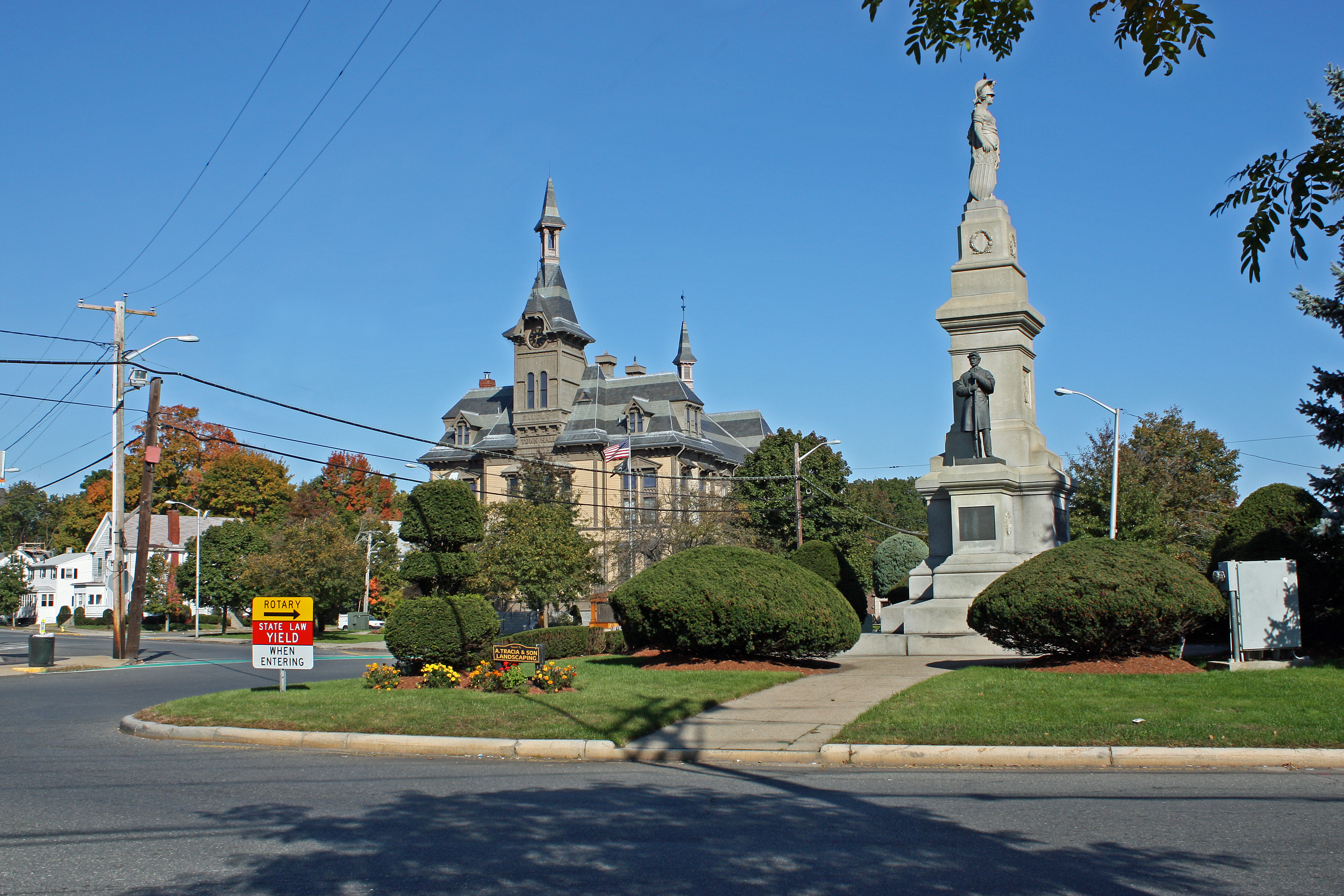
Saugus Civil War Monument

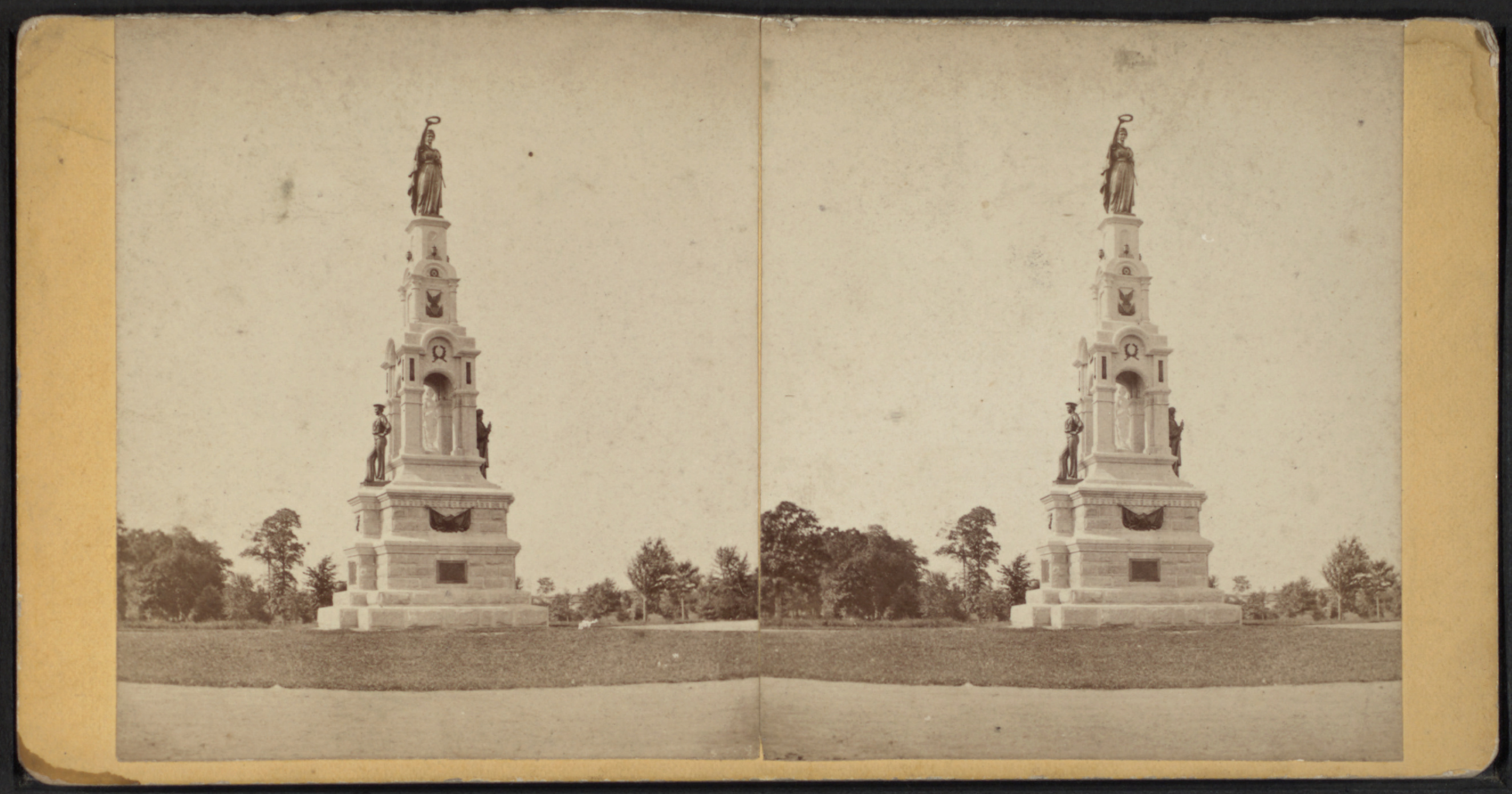
Bridgeport Soldiers Monument

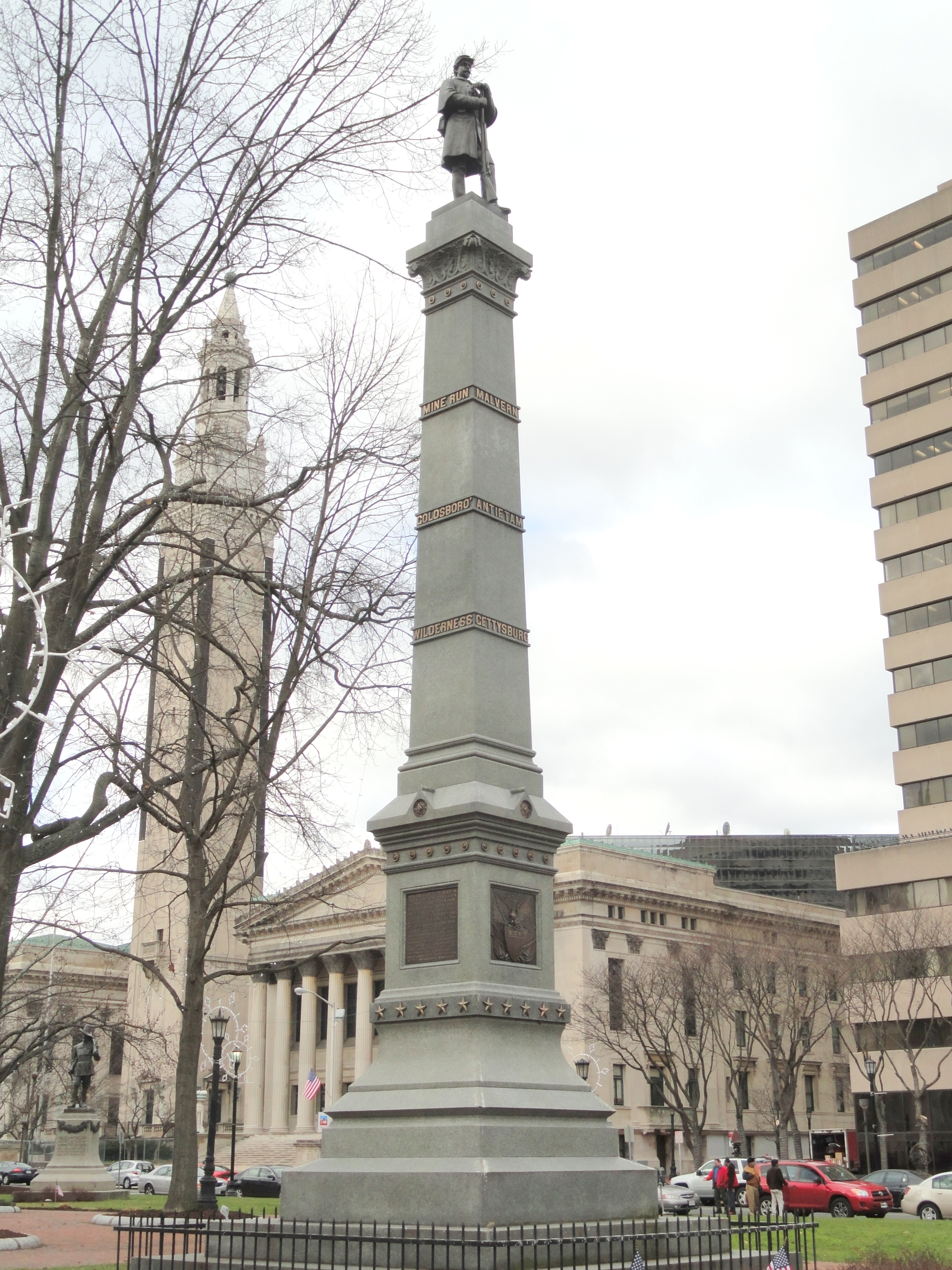
Springfield Civil War Monument

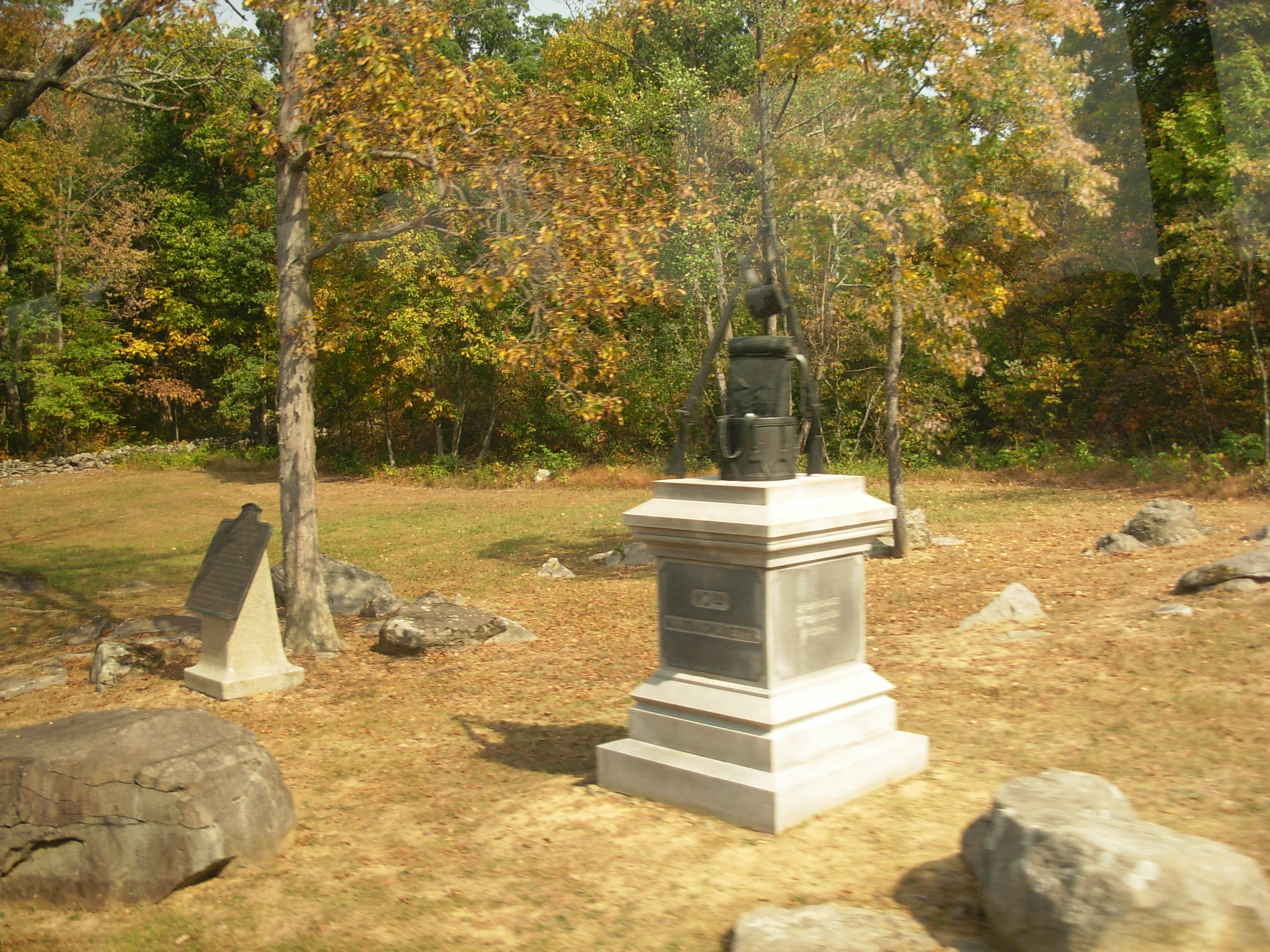
10th Massachusetts Infantry Monument

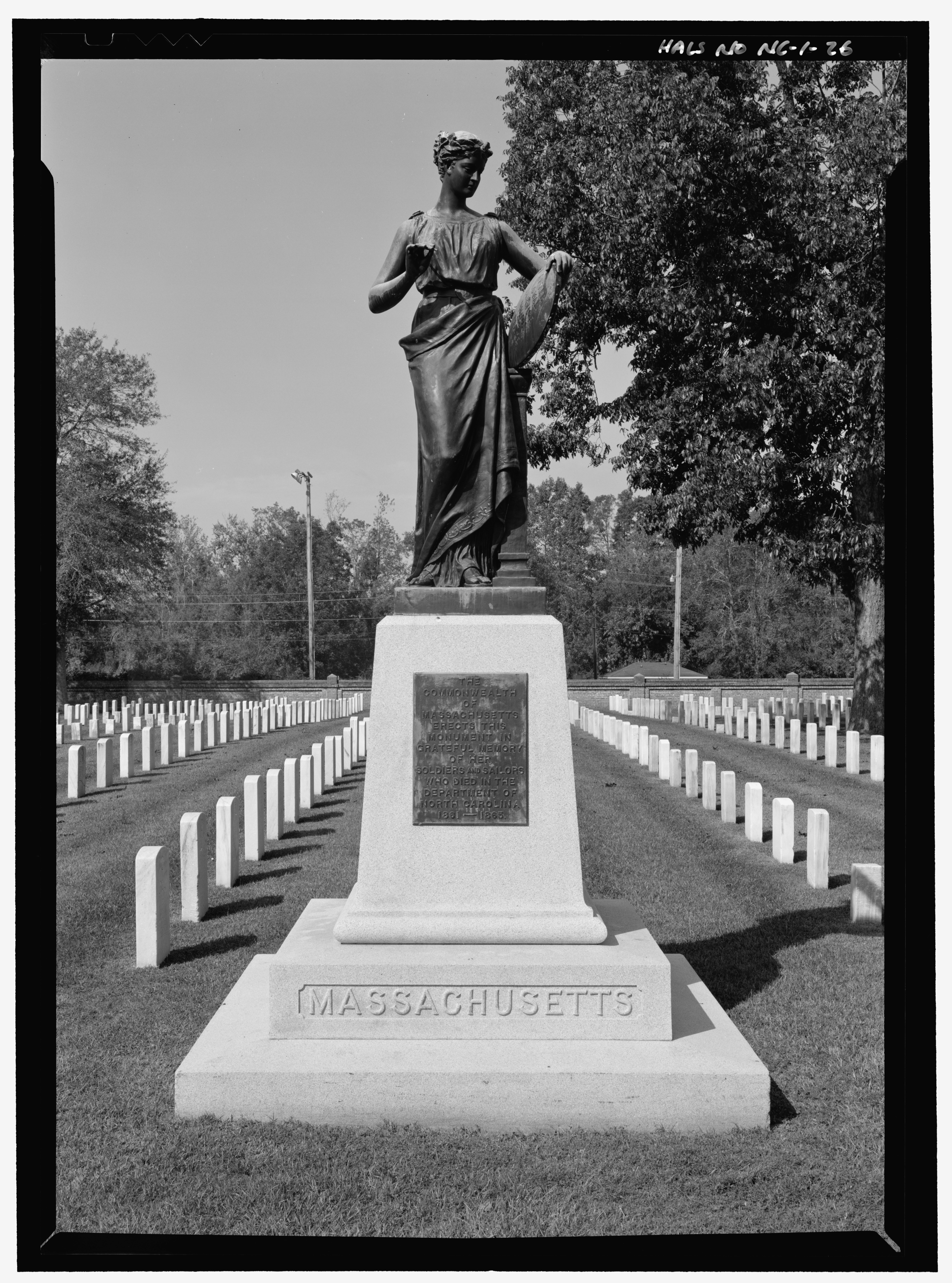
Massachusetts Monument, New Bern National Cemetery

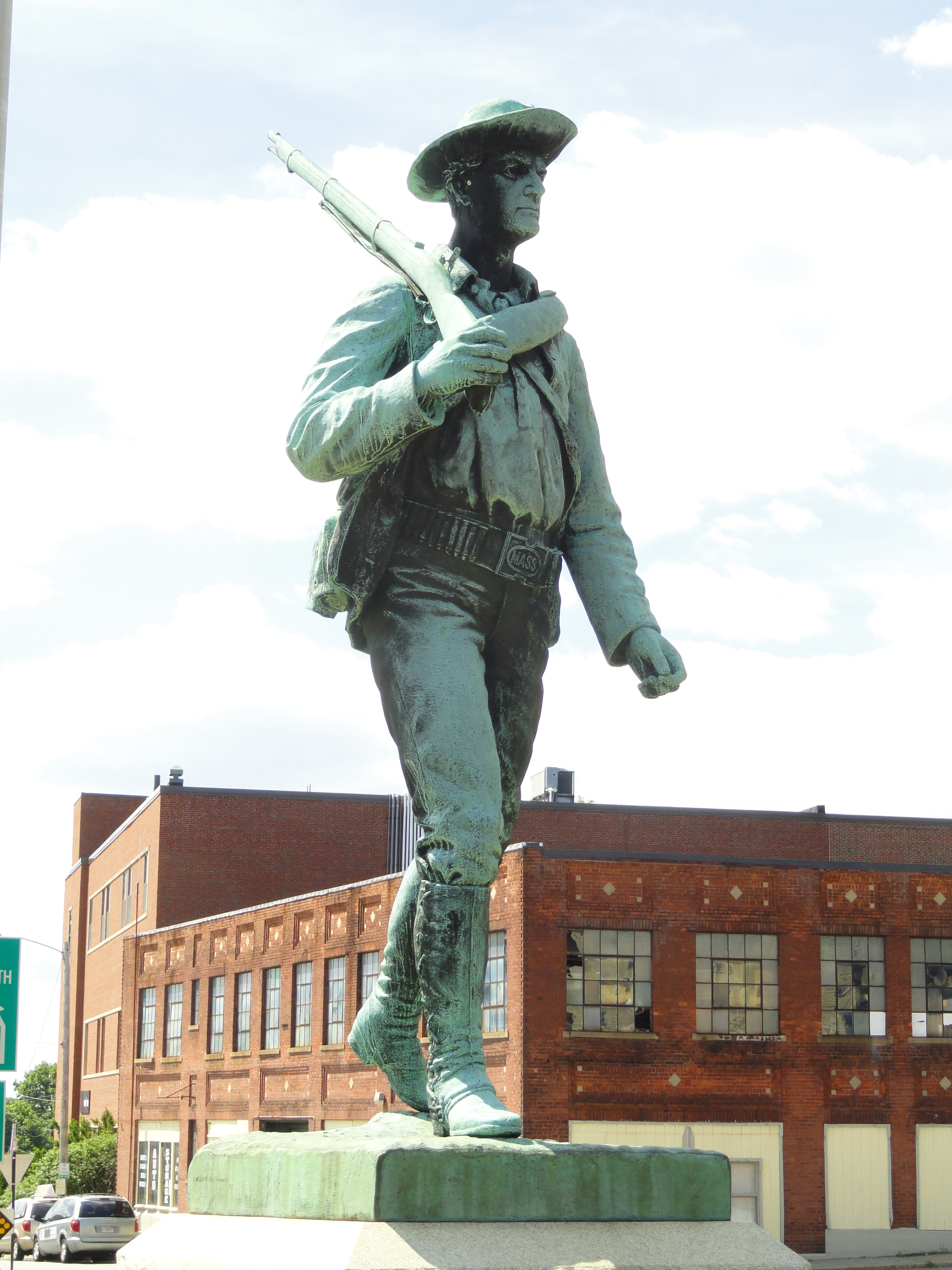
Gardner Spanish–American War Monument

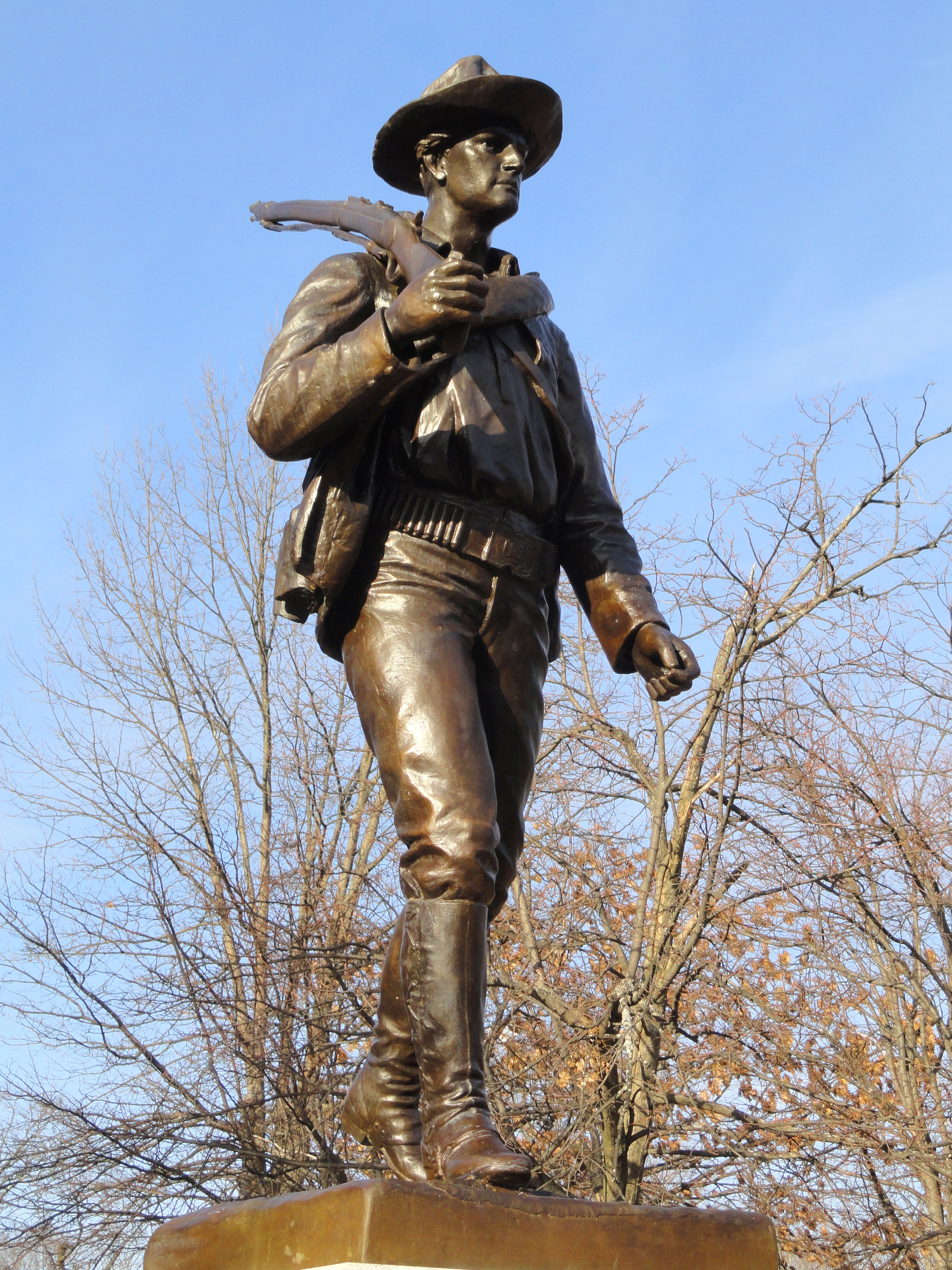
The Spanish War Veteran, Lawrence, Massachusetts

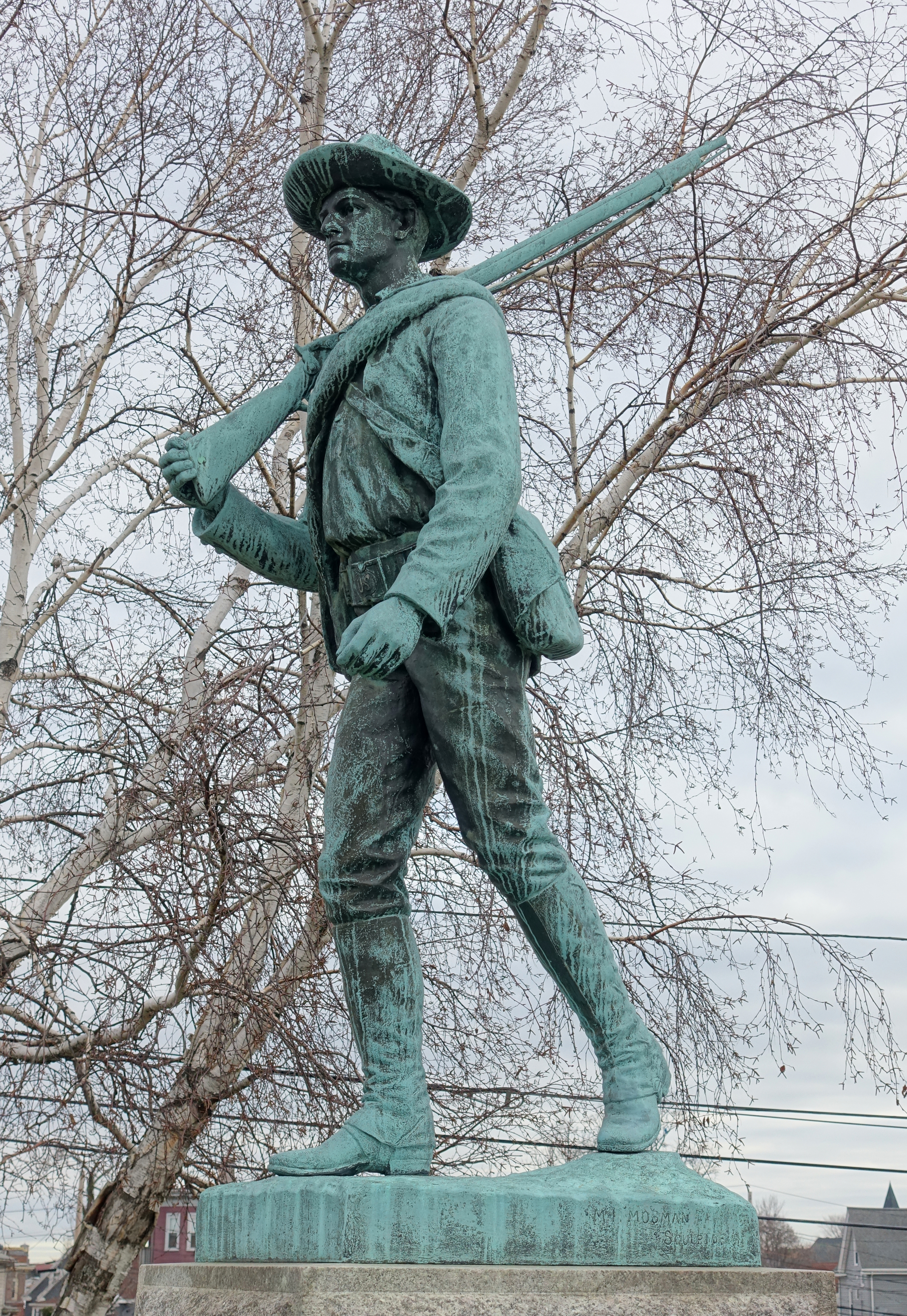
The Spanish War Veteran, Revere, Massachusetts

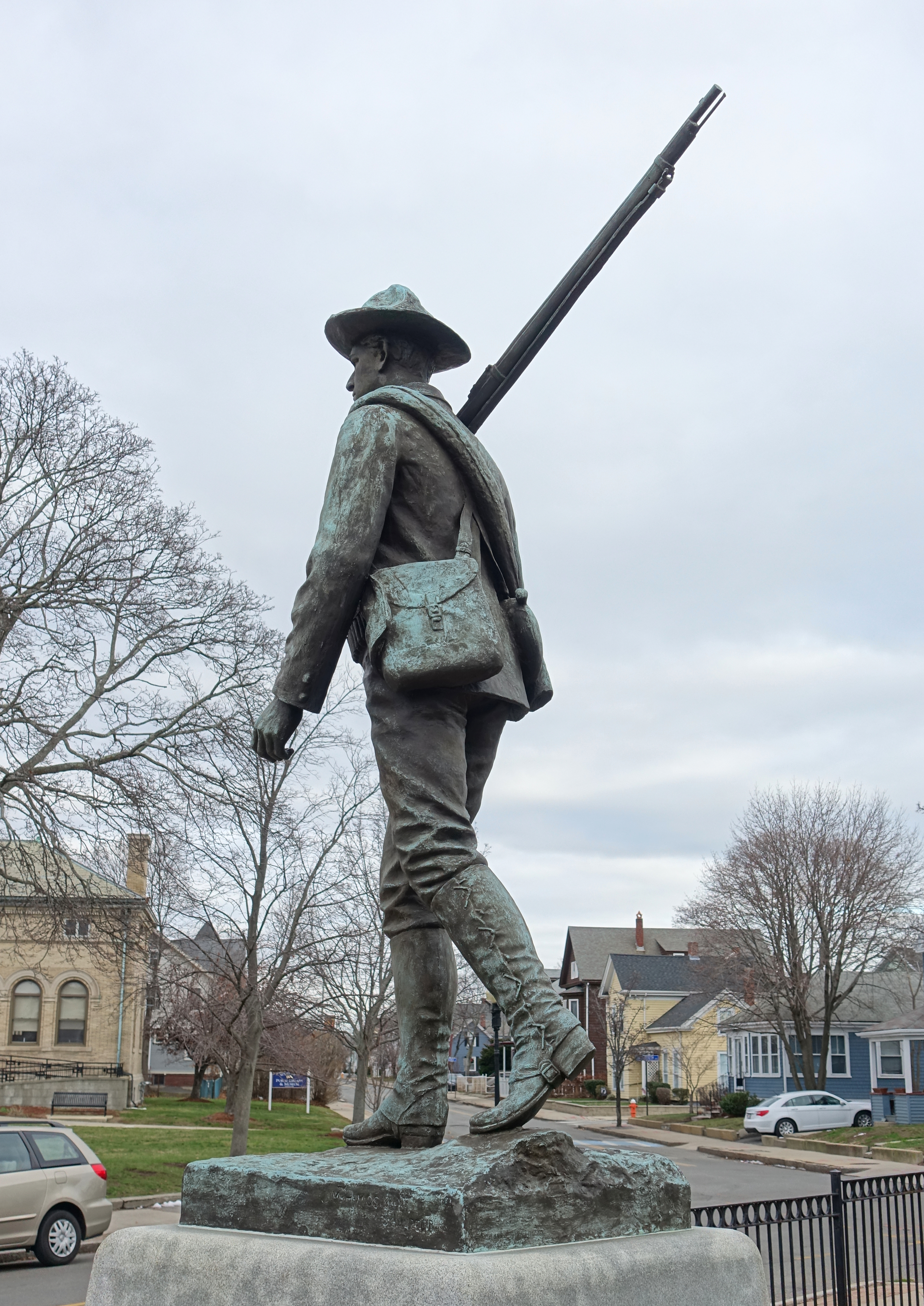
The Spanish War Veteran, Winthrop, Massachusetts

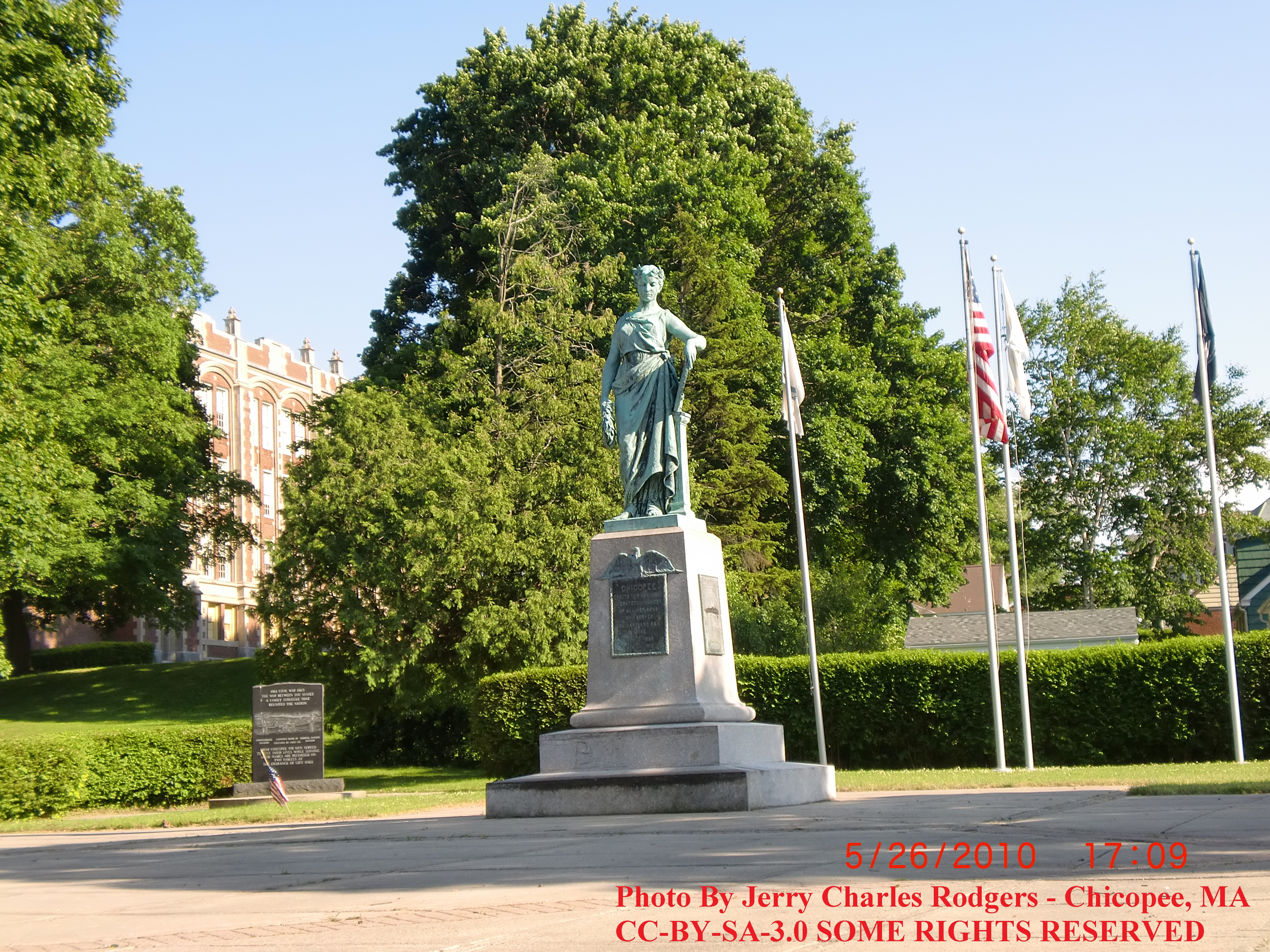
Chicopee World War I Memorial
