= Nathan Peabody Ames =

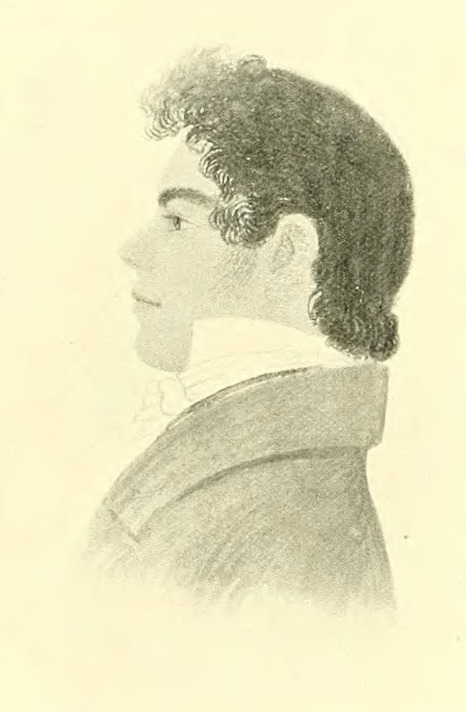
- Born: September 1, 1803; Lowell
- Died: April 3, 1847; Cabotville Common Historic District
- Occupations: Manufacturer, entrepreneur

Nathan Peabody Ames (September 1, 1803 – April 3, 1847) was an American manufacturer and entrepreneur. With his younger brother, James T. Ames, he founded the Ames Manufacturing Company.

Nathan Peabody Ames was born on September 1, 1803 in Lowell; however sources have different claims of his birth location (Westfield). Ames began business in Chicopee Falls (now called Chicopee), Massachusetts, where he opened a cutlery shop in 1829. He became known as a skillful sword-maker, furnishing large numbers by contract to the U. S. government. His business having increased, he moved to Cabotville, Mass, and with his associates incorporated the Ames Manufacturing Company in 1834. In 1836, the works were supplemented by the addition of a foundry for casting bronze cannon and church-bells. This establishment soon became famous, and furnished most of the brass cannon for the U. S. army. The statues of De Witt Clinton, in Greenwood Cemetery, Brooklyn, N. Y., of Washington, in Union Square, New York, and of Franklin, in School Street, Boston, Mass., were cast at this foundry. In 1840, Ames visited Europe for the purpose of inspecting the various armories and of acquiring the latest information in regard to improved processes. In 1844, he received an important order from the British government for machines used in the manufacture of muskets.

Nathan Peabody Ames died on 3 April 1847 in Chicopee. Chicopee would then become a separate town, partitioned from Springfield, Massachusetts in 1852, 5 years after his death.
