= Ames Manufacturing Company =

- U.S. National Register of Historic Places
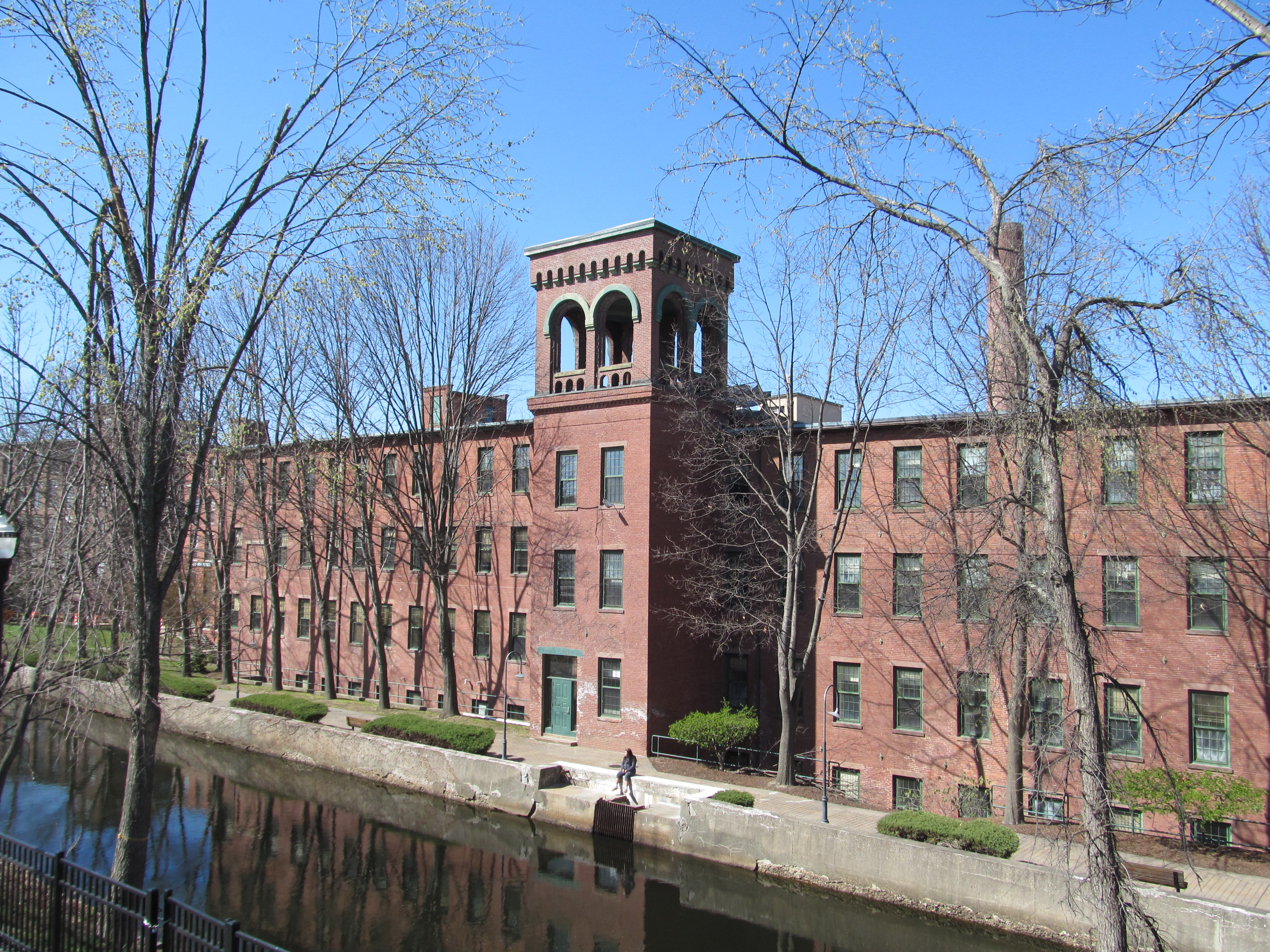
- The former Ames factory in Chicopee, MA, now The Apartments at Ames Privilege

- Location within Massachusetts Location within the United States
- Location: Chicopee, Massachusetts
- Coordinates: 42°8′57″N 72°36′24″W
- Built: 1847
- Architect: Charles McClallan
- Architectural style: Early Republic, Greek Revival
- NRHP reference No.: 83000734
- Added to NRHP: June 23, 1983

Ames Manufacturing Company was a manufacturer of swords, tools, and cutlery in Chicopee, Massachusetts, as well as an iron and bronze foundry. They were a significant provider of side arms, swords, light artillery, and heavy ordnance for the Union in the American Civil War. They also cast several bronze statues, which can be found throughout New England.

== Company history ==
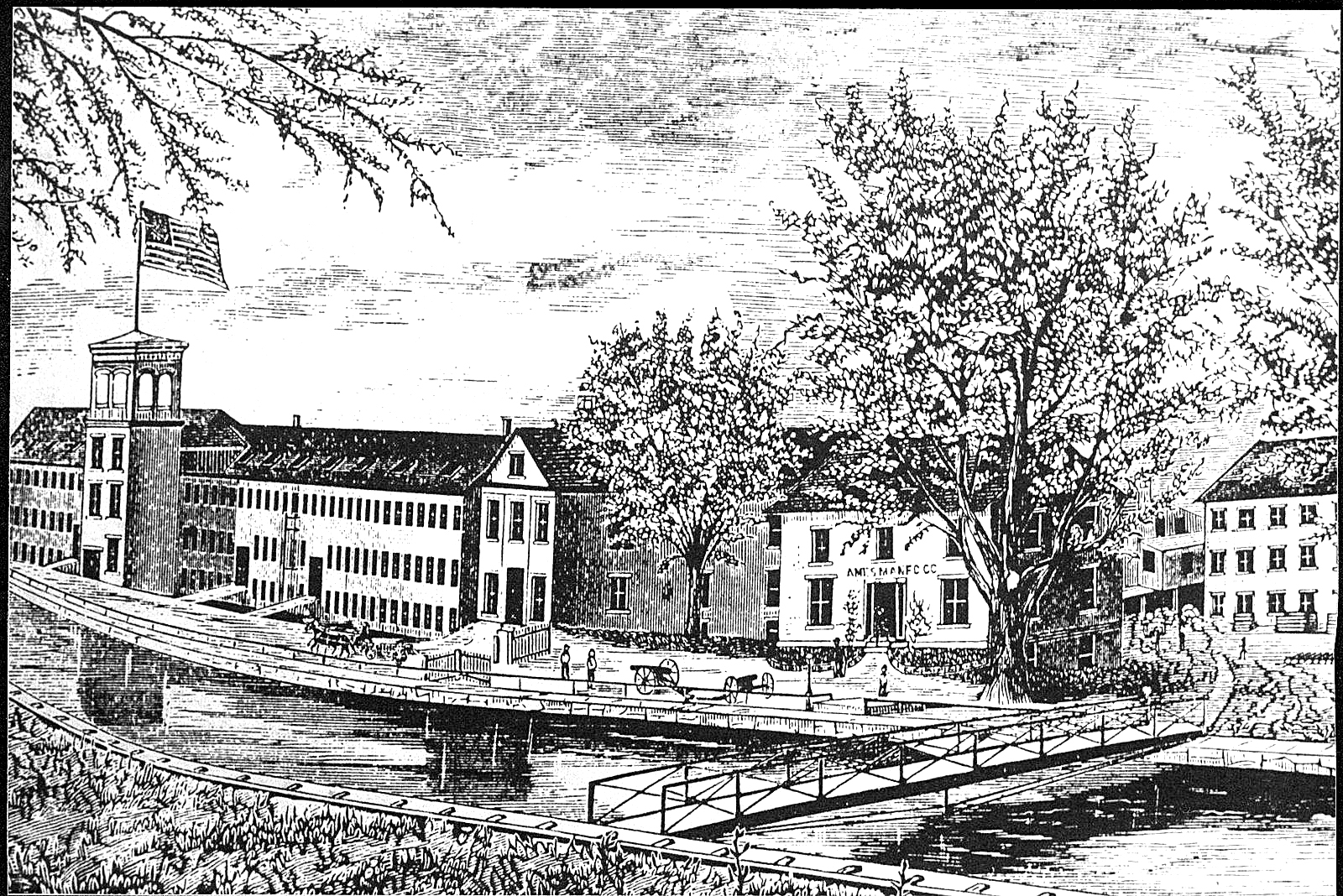
Undated woodcut.

The Ames Manufacturing Company has its origins in a factory established in 1774 in Chelmsford, Massachusetts by the Ames family. Brothers Nathan P. Ames Jr. and James T. Ames moved their tool and cutlery business to a new industrial town on the Chicopee River near Springfield, Massachusetts in 1829. They were invited by Edmund Dwight, who owned textile mills nearby. The Ames company began manufacturing swords for the federal government and state militias.

As the town of Chicopee was formed in 1848, the Ames brothers were leaders in the new community. Upon the death of Nathan P. Ames in 1847, ownership of the company turned to younger brother James Tyler Ames.

=== Iron and bronze foundries ===
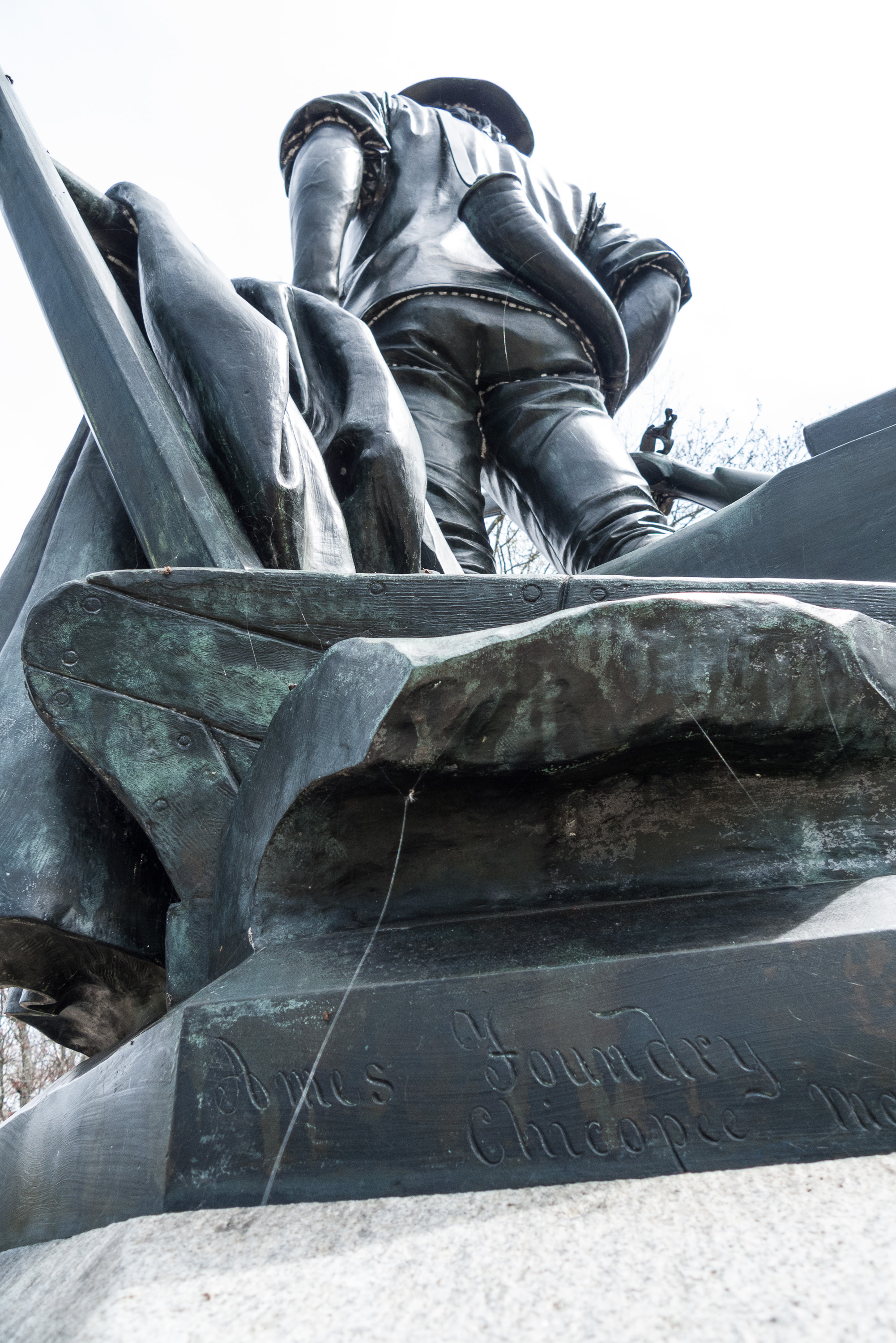
The Ames foundry mark can be seen on Daniel Chester French's Minuteman statue

By 1835, the company was creating works in brass and bronze, and in 1845, an iron foundry was added. The company used the foundries for casting statuary and producing military cannons and cannonballs.

The bronze doors of the East Wing of the United States Capitol and Daniel Chester French's Minuteman statue at the Lexington-Concord bridge were cast at the Ames company. Other statues included large equestrian statues of George Washington (at the Boston Public Garden and in Washington, D.C.), a statue of Benjamin Franklin (Boston), and a statue of Major John Mason.

When the Mexican–American War broke out, the foundry's primary output switched to armament.

=== Civil War ===
Upon the declared secession and formation of the Confederate States of America, the United States Army lost access to its southern arsenals. Independent arms manufacturers became crucial to the success of the U.S. Army. Ames was one of the U.S. Army's most important manufacturers of side arms, swords, and light artillery and the third largest producer of heavy ordnance.

=== Post-war diversification and decline ===
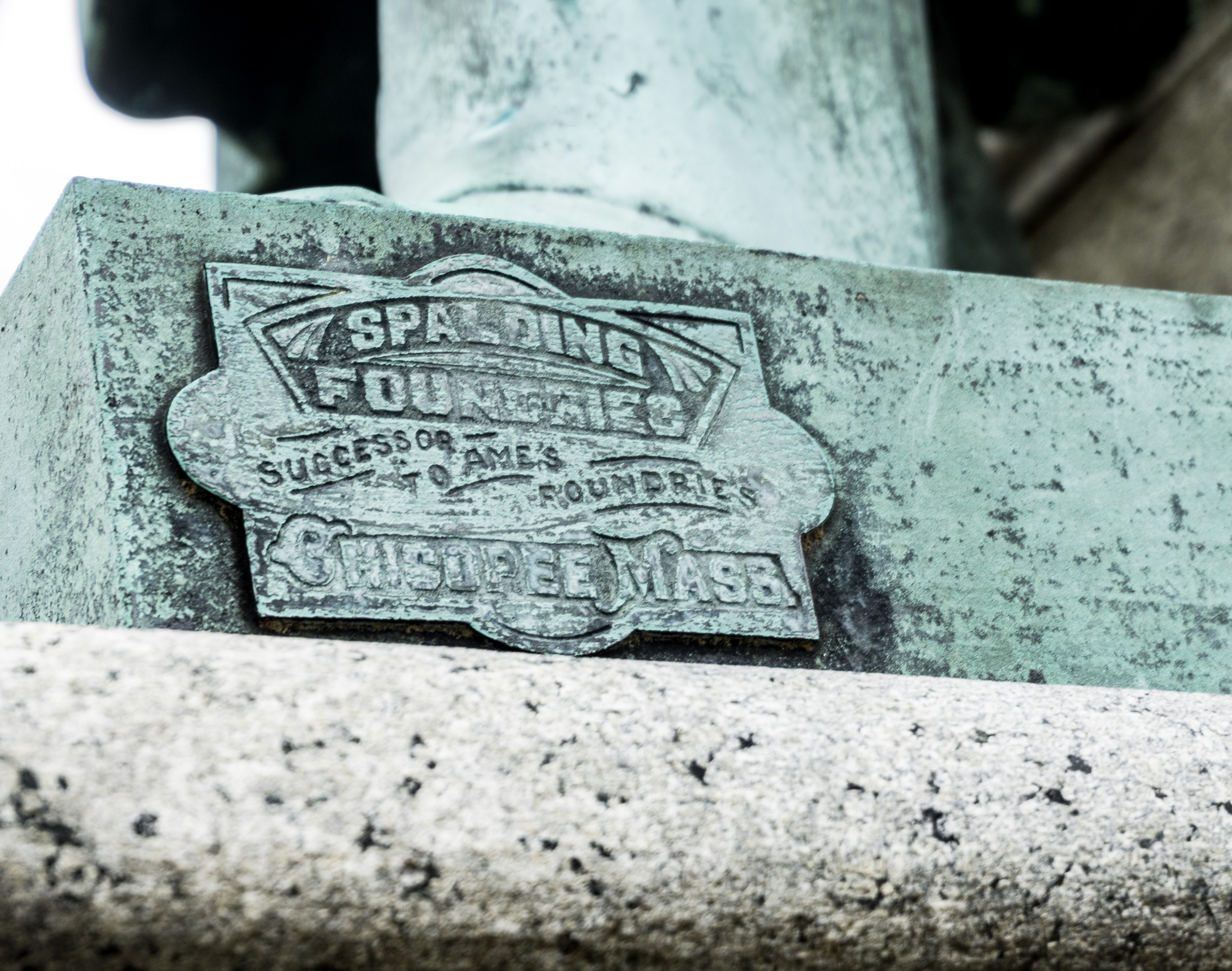
This foundry mark on a Civil War memorial in Attleboro, Massachusetts, indicates that the Spalding company acquired Ames Foundries.

In addition to producing military equipment for many years, including swords, cannons, and cannonballs, it produced sewing machine and bicycle parts in the later 19th century. The company was a major supplier of bicycles to the Overman Wheel Company from 1883-1887. The sword manufacturing business was formally separated into an independent company in 1881.

By 1907, the Ames foundries had been purchased by Chicopee's A.G. Spalding Company.

- In 1848, E. Remington and Sons purchased gun-making machinery from the company and took over a contract for Jenks breechloading percussion carbines for the U.S. Navy.
- National Sewing Machine Company purchased sewing machine dies and equipment from Ames.

== Surviving buildings ==
The historic Ames Company factory, located at 5-7 Springfield Street in Chicopee, Massachusetts, is a complex of connected industrial buildings, the oldest of which dates to 1847. Most of the older elements are brick in construction and range in height from one to four stories. This complex was added to the National Register of Historic Places in 1983. The largest surviving buildings have been converted into residences.

== Notable employees ==
- Emerson Gaylord
- John Quincy Adams Ward
- Melzar Hunt Mosman
- Karl Gerhardt
- James H. Burton

== Gallery ==
Past works of the Ames Manufacturing Company

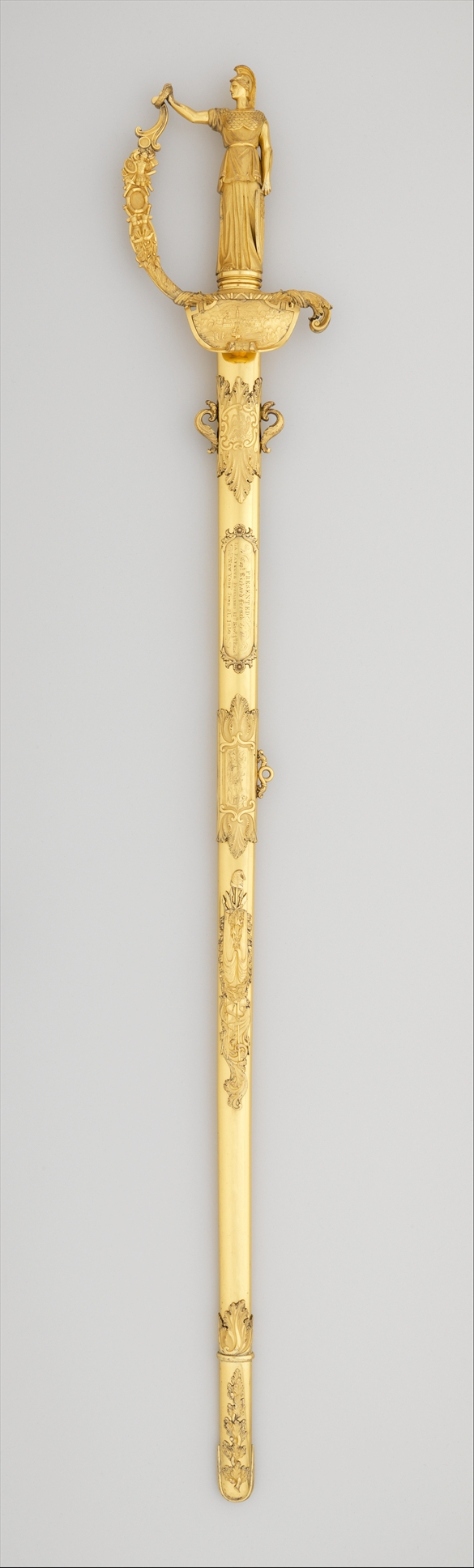
Sword and Scabbard of Captain Richard French, currently in display at the Metropolitan Museum of Art.

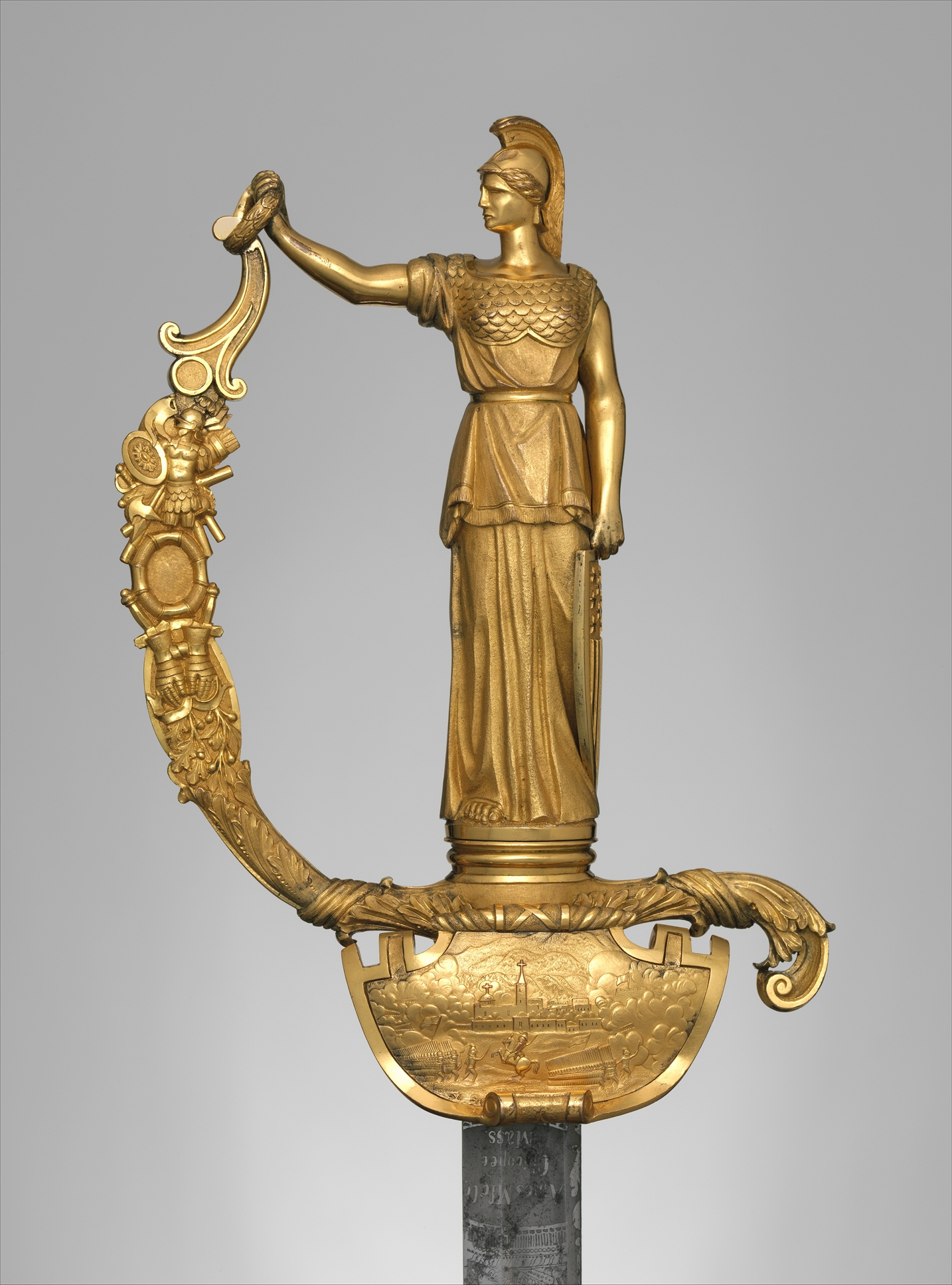
The handle of Capt. French's sword.

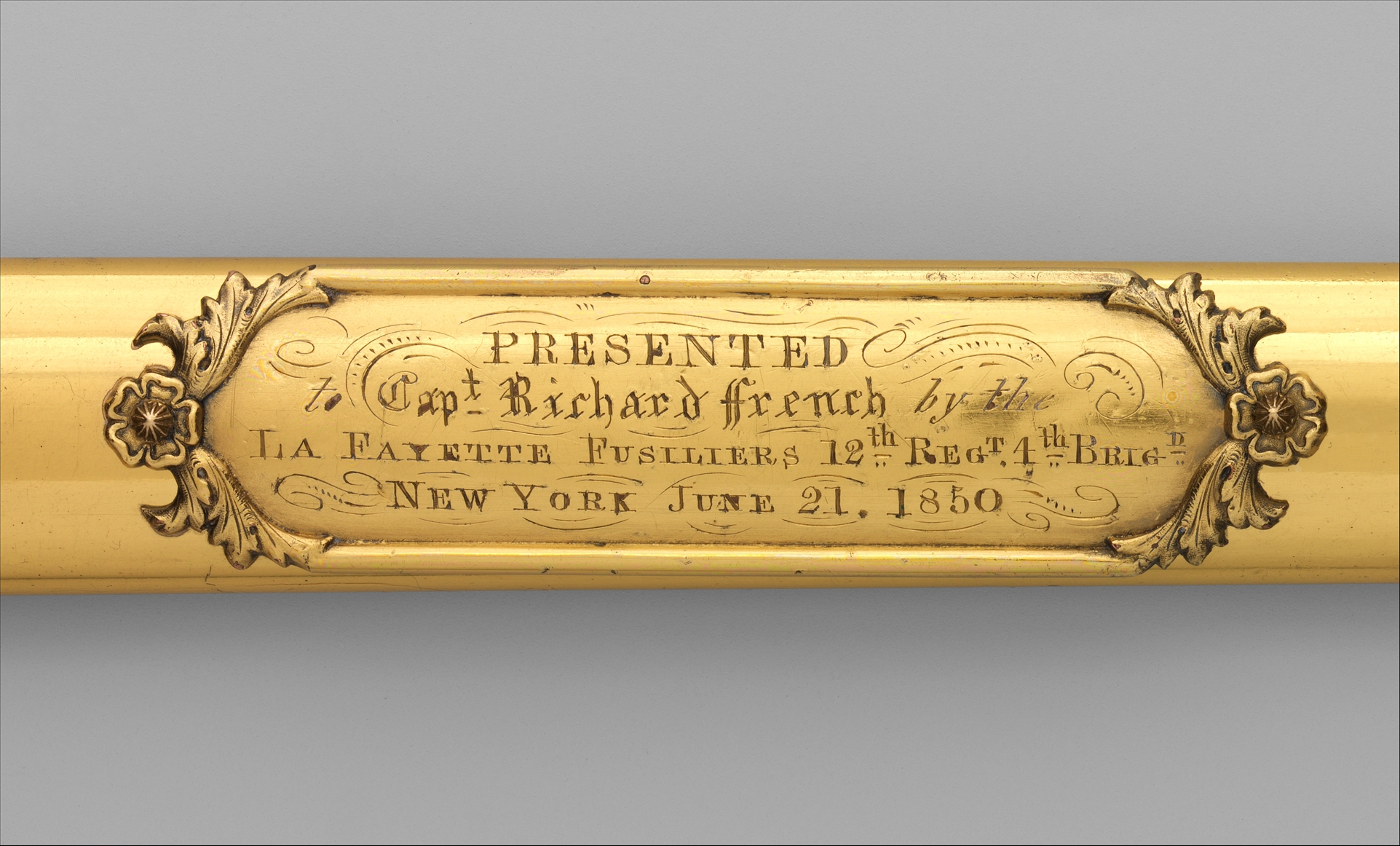
The sword was presented to Capt. French by the men of his company "LaFayette Fusiliers" on June 21, 1850.

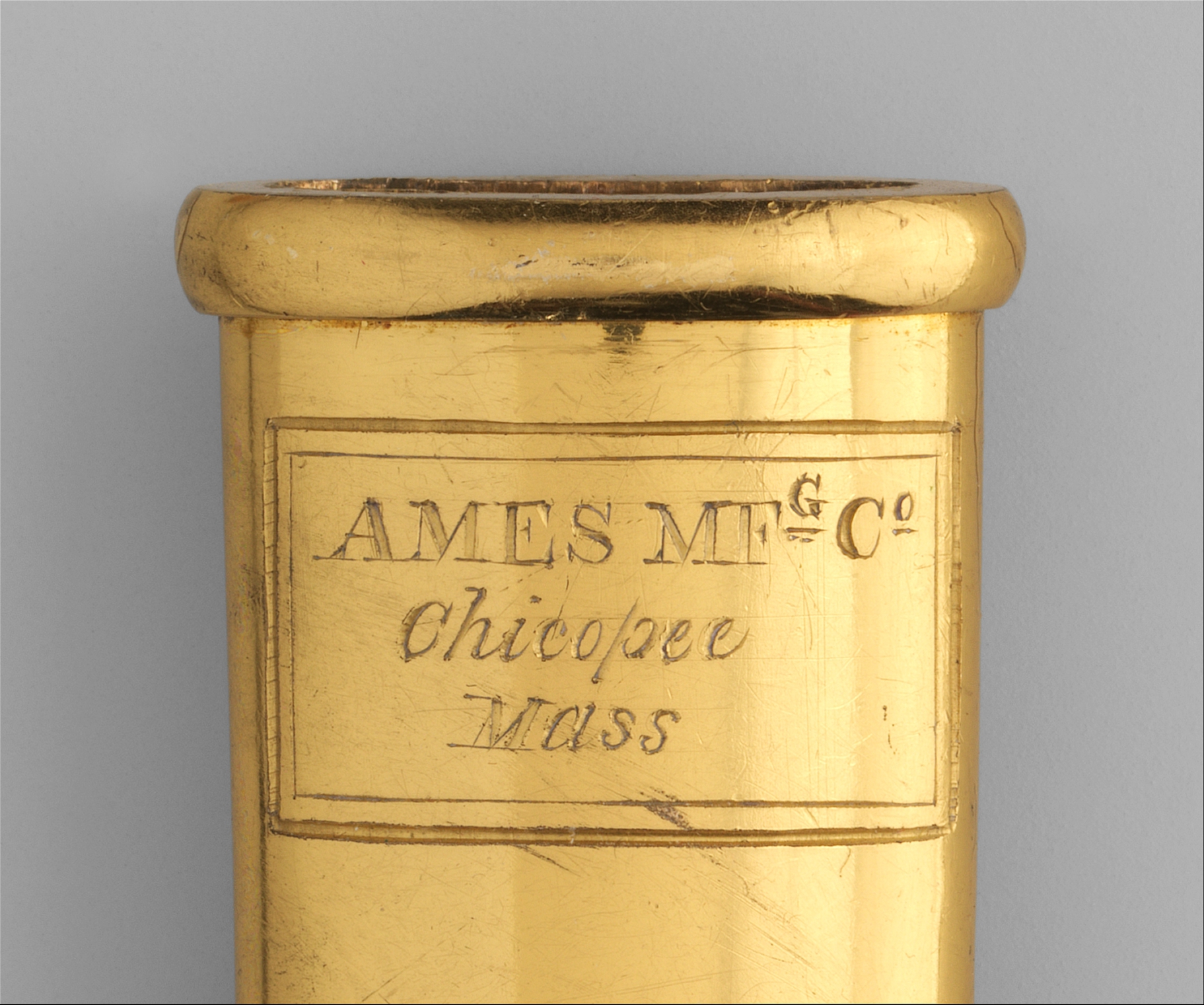
Ames Mfg Co. inscription on the Sword of Captain Richard French.

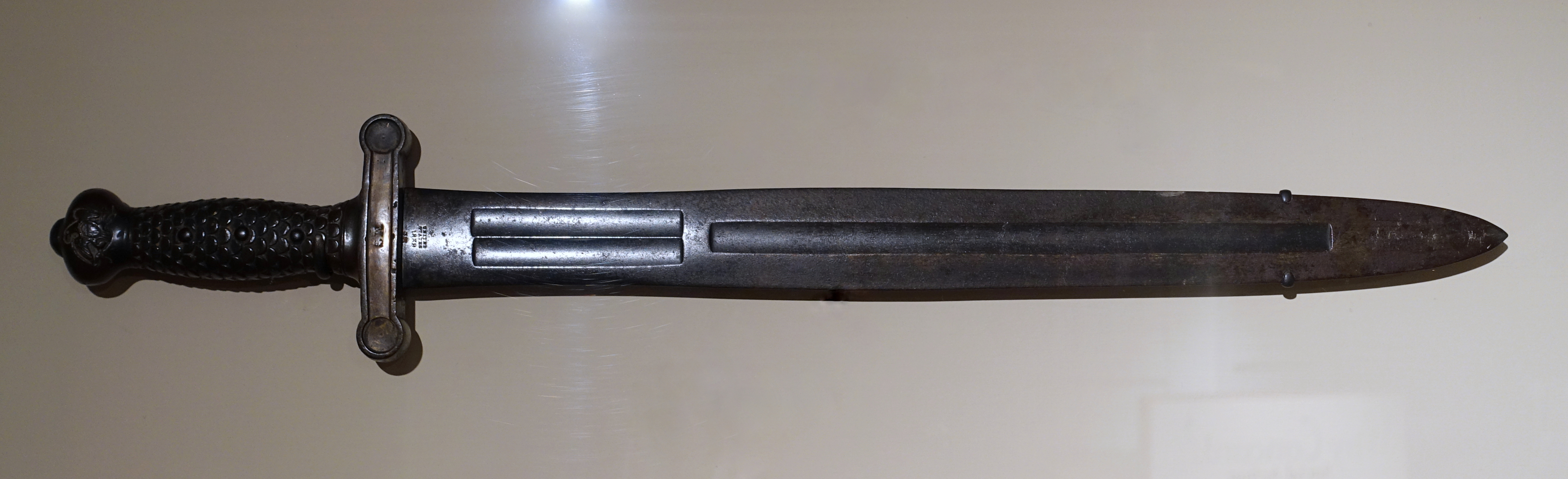
Model 1832 Artillery Sword in display at the Concord Museum.
Notable works of the Ames Foundry

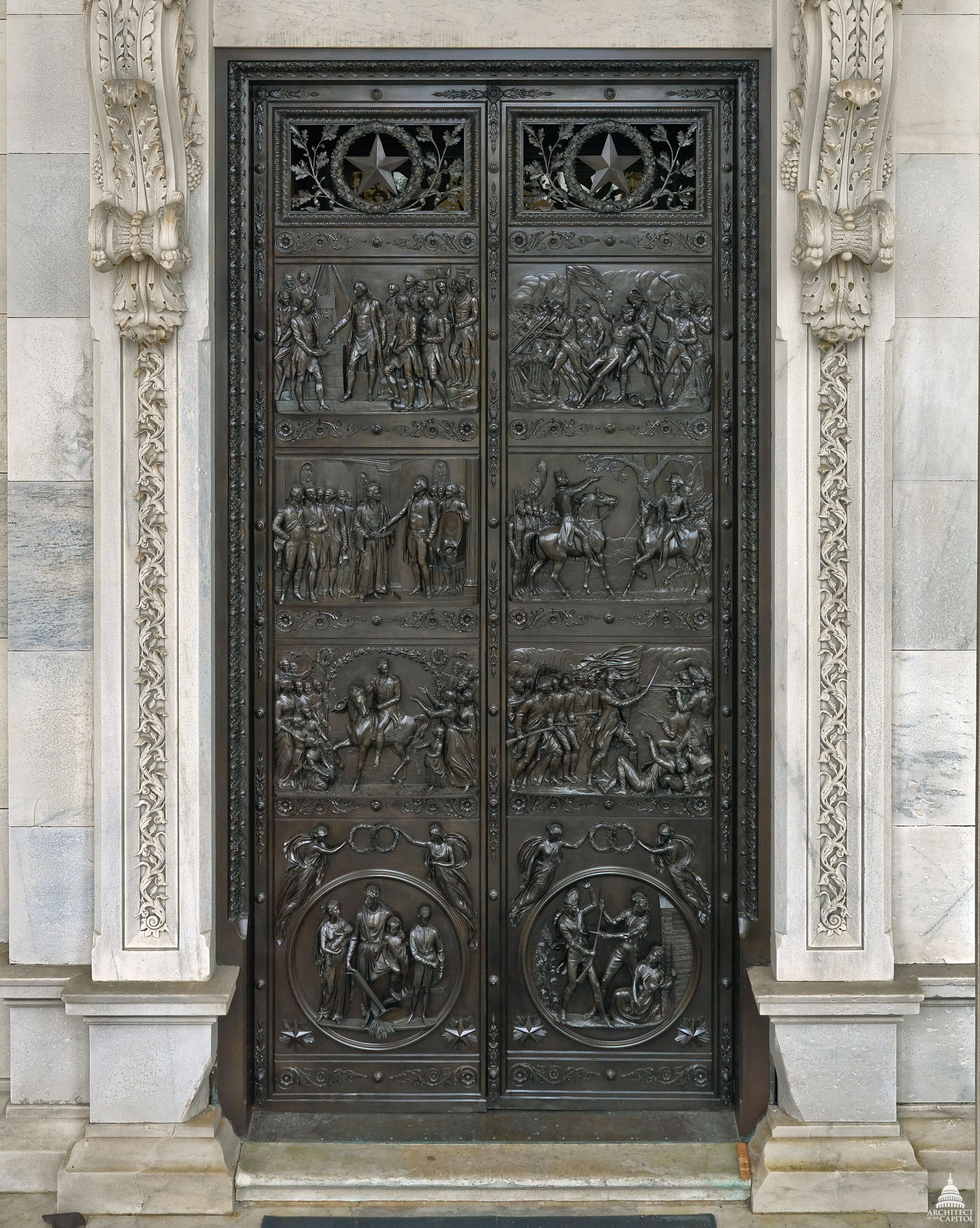
Ornate bronze doors on the east portico of the Senate wing were cast by James T. Ames in 1864–1868, and placed late in 1868.

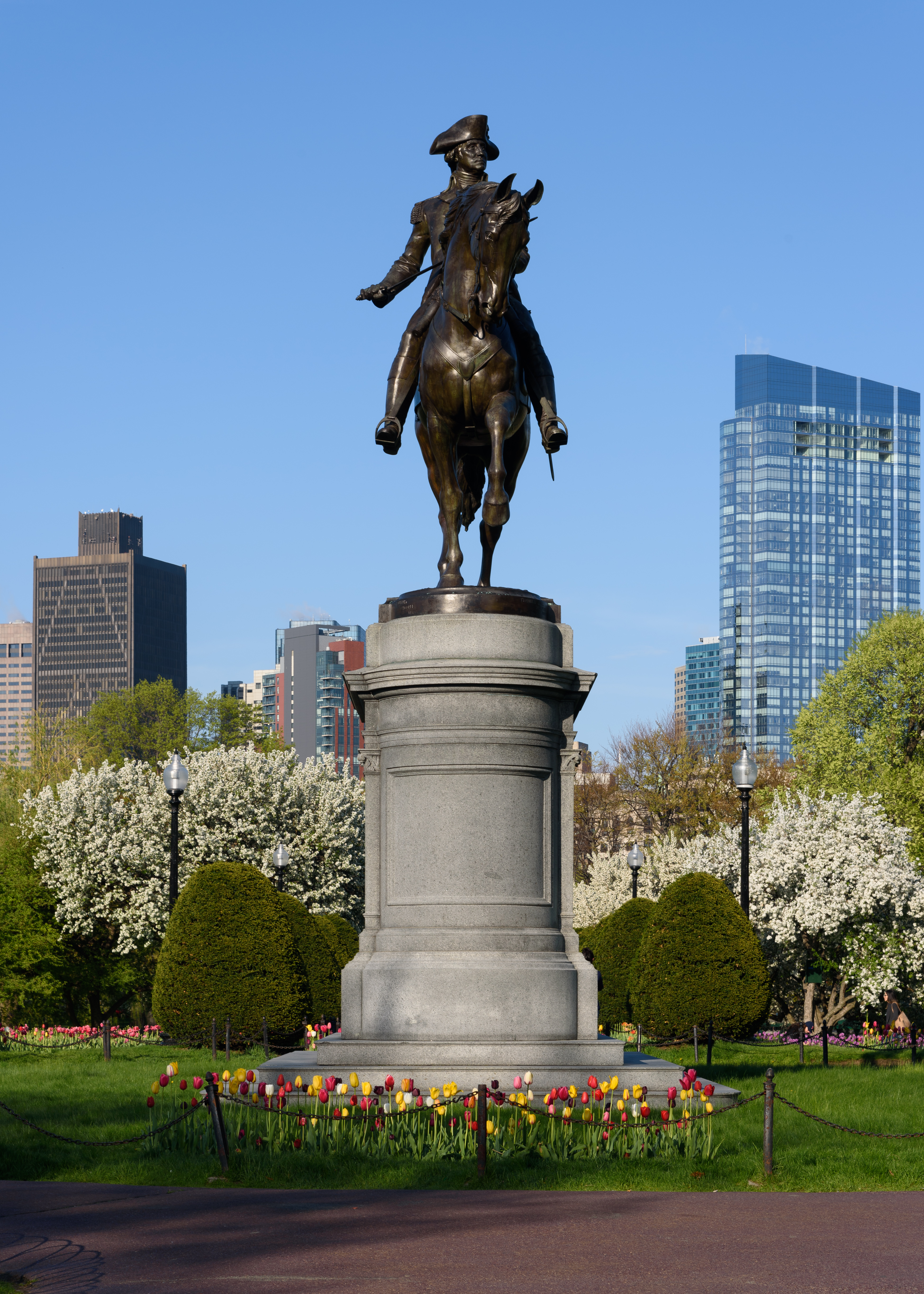
Equestrian statue of George Washington (Boston)

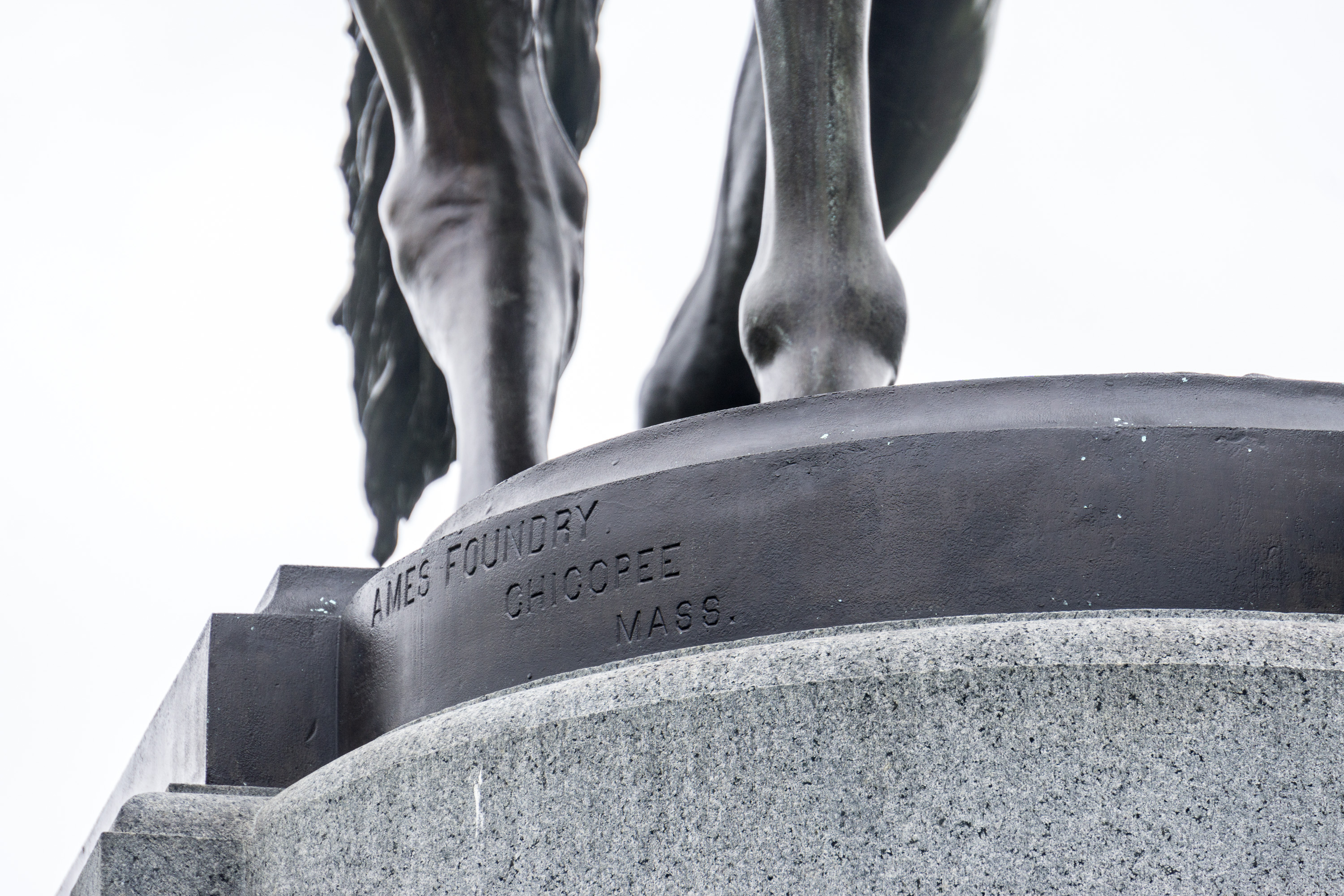
Foundry mark on the Equestrian statue of George Washington. (Boston Public Garden)

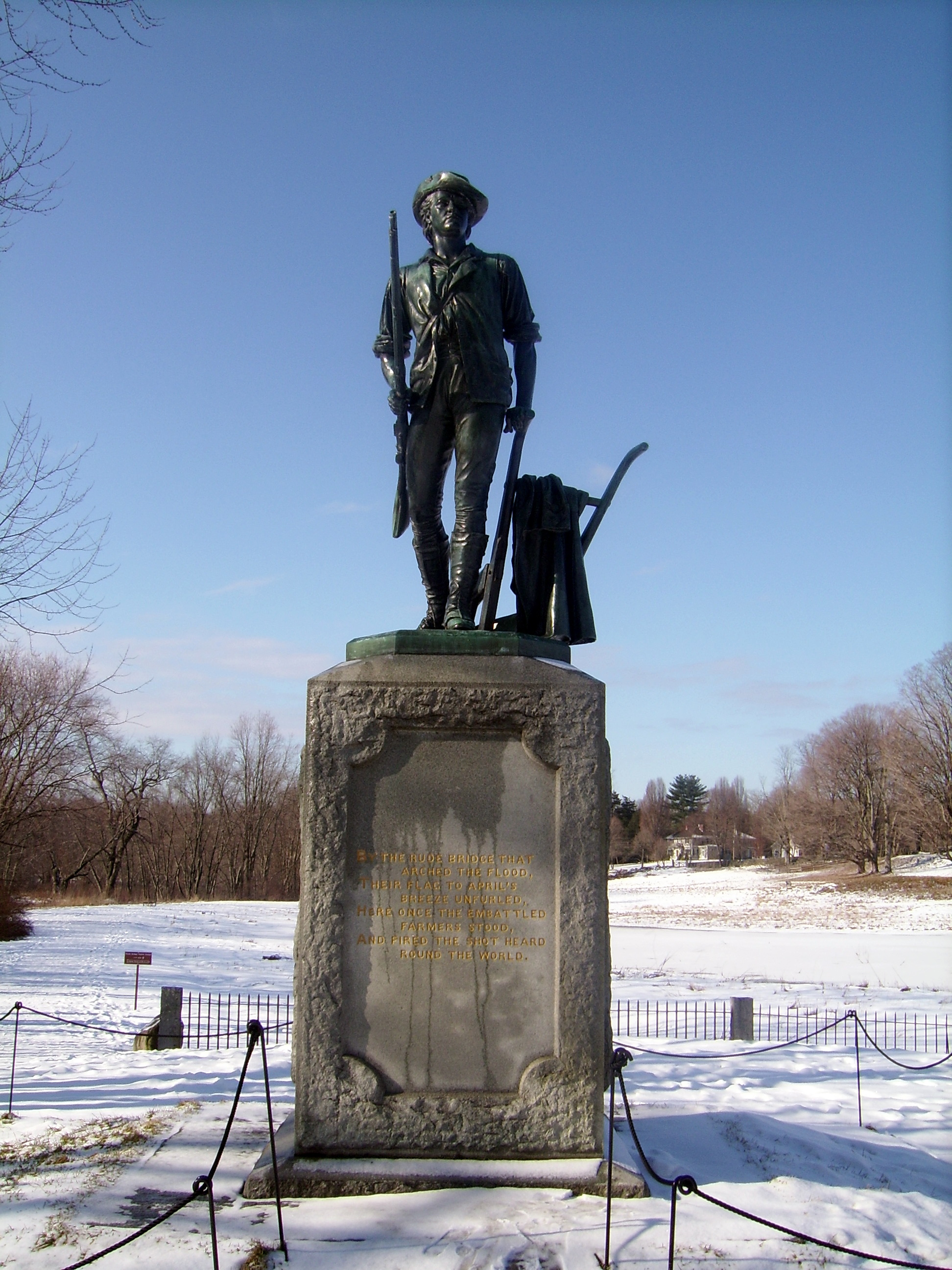
The Minute Man sculpture by Daniel Chester French was cast at Ames.

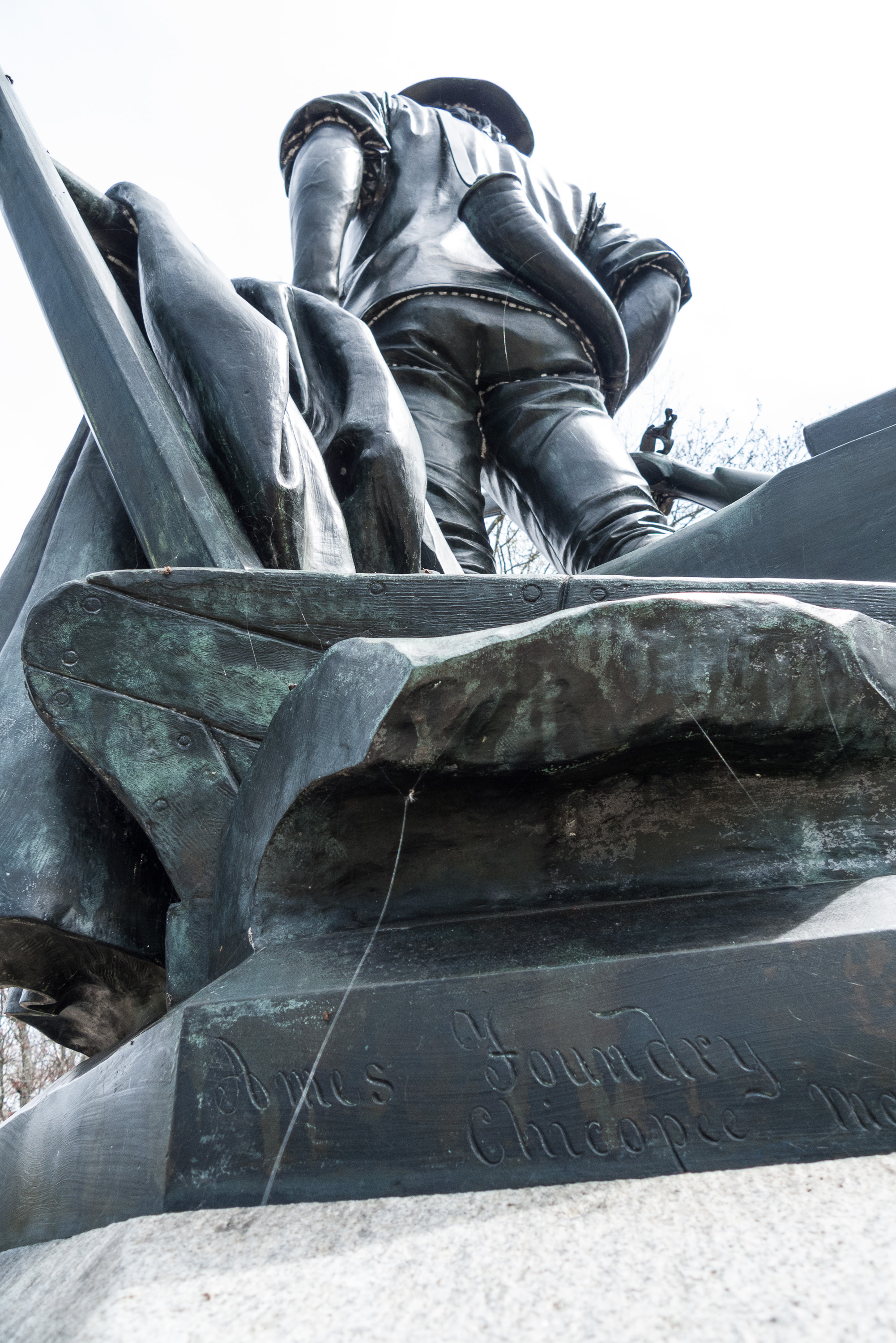
Foundry mark on the Minuteman by Daniel Chester French, (Concord, Massachusetts)

== See also ==
- James rifle
- Model 1832 Foot Artillery Sword
- National Register of Historic Places listings in Hampden County, Massachusetts
- Field artillery in the American Civil War
