= List of Medal of Honor recipients for the Gettysburg Campaign =

The Gettysburg campaign was a campaign of the American Civil War in 1863. The Union and Confederate forces fought between June 3 and July 24 in southern Pennsylvania, Maryland, and northern Virginia. The main and namesake battle of the campaign was the Battle of Gettysburg, which was fought from July 1 to July 3 in and around the town of Gettysburg, Pennsylvania. The battle involved the largest number of casualties of the entire war and is often described as a turning point of the civil war. The Medal of Honor was awarded to 71 Union soldiers for seven different actions of the campaign.

| Action | Dates | Number of awards |
|---|---|---|
| Second Battle of Winchester | June 13–15 | 3 |
| Battle of Aldie | June 17 | 1 |
| Battle of Hanover | June 30 | 1 |
| Battle of Gettysburg | July 1–3 | 62 |
| Battle of Fairfield | July 3 | 2 |
| Battle of Monterey Pass | July 4–5 | 1 |
| Battle of Williamsport | July 6–16 | 1 |

The Medal of Honor was created during the American Civil War in 1862. It was, and is, the highest military decoration presented by the United States government to a member of its armed forces. The recipients must have distinguished themselves at the risk of their own life above and beyond the call of duty in action against an enemy of the United States. The award criteria have been modified over time and no longer match those used for awards during the Civil War. Due to the nature of the medal it is commonly, though by far not exclusively, awarded posthumously.

The Medal of Honor in the original 1862 U.S. Army version

== Recipients ==
This color, along with the * , indicates that the Medal of Honor was awarded posthumously

| Image | Name | Rank | Unit | Date of action | Date of award | Citation & Notes |
|---|---|---|---|---|---|---|
| | Nathaniel M. Allen | Corporal | 1st Massachusetts Infantry | July 2, 1863 | March 29, 1899 | "When his regiment was falling back, this soldier, bearing the national color, returned in the face of the enemy's fire, pulled the regimental flag from under the body of its bearer, who had fallen, saved the flag from capture, and brought both colors off the field." |
| — | Elijah W. Bacon* | Private | 14th Connecticut Infantry | July 3, 1863 | December 1, 1864 | "Capture of flag of 16th North Carolina regiment (C.S.A.)." |
| | George G. Benedict | Second Lieutenant | 12th Vermont Infantry | July 3, 1863 | June 27, 1892 | "Passed through a murderous fire of grape and canister in delivering orders and re-formed the crowded lines." |
| — | Morris Brown, Jr.* | Captain | 126th New York Infantry | July 3, 1863 | March 6, 1869 | "Capture of flag." (28th North Carolina Infantry) |
| — | Thomas Burke | Private | 5th New York Cavalry | June 30, 1863 | February 11, 1878 | "Capture of battle flag." (13th Virginia Cavalry at the Battle of Hanover) |
| | Charles E. Capehart | Major | 1st West Virginia Cavalry | July 4, 1863 | April 7, 1898 | "While commanding the regiment, Major Capehart charged down the mountain side at midnight, in a heavy rain, upon the enemy's fleeing wagon train. Many wagons were captured and destroyed and many prisoners taken." (at the Battle of Monterey Pass) |
| — | Hugh Carey | Sergeant | 82nd New York Infantry | July 2, 1863 | February 6, 1888 | "Captured the flag of the 7th Virginia Infantry (C.S.A.), being twice wounded in the effort." |
| — | Casper R. Carlisle | Private | Company F, Pennsylvania Light Artillery | July 2, 1863 | December 21, 1892 | "Saved a gun of his battery under heavy musketry fire, most of the horses being killed and the drivers wounded." |
| | Joshua L. Chamberlain | Colonel | 20th Maine Infantry | July 2, 1863 | August 11, 1893 | "...for daring heroism and great tenacity in holding his position on the Little Round Top against repeated assaults, and carrying the advance position on the Great Round Top." |
| | Harrison Clark | Corporal | 125th New York Infantry | July 2, 1863 | June 11, 1895 | "Seized the colors and advanced with them after the color bearer had been shot." |
| — | John E. Clopp | Private | 71st Pennsylvania Infantry | July 3, 1863 | February 2, 1865 | "Capture of flag of 9th Virginia Infantry (C.S.A.), wresting it from the color bearer." |
| | Jefferson Coates | Sergeant | 7th Wisconsin Infantry | July 1, 1863 | June 29, 1866 | "Unsurpassed courage in battle, where he had both eyes shot out." |
| | Alonzo H. Cushing* | First Lieutenant | Battery A, 4th U.S. Light Artillery | July 3, 1863 | November 6, 2014 | "Refusing to evacuate to the rear despite his severe wounds, he directed the operation of his lone field piece continuing to fire in the face of the enemy." |
| — | Joseph H. De Castro | Corporal | 19th Massachusetts Infantry | July 3, 1863 | December 1, 1864 | "Capture of flag of 19th Virginia Infantry regiment (C.S.A.)." |
| | Luigi Palma di Cesnola | Colonel | 4th New York Cavalry | June 17, 1863 | December 6, 1897 | "Was present, in arrest, when, seeing his regiment fall back, he rallied his men, accompanied them, without arms, in a second charge, and in recognition of his gallantry was released from arrest. He continued in the action at the head of his regiment until he was desperately wounded and taken prisoner." (at the Battle of Aldie) |
| — | George H. Dore | Sergeant | 126th New York Infantry | July 3, 1863 | December 1, 1864 | "The colors being struck down by a shell as the enemy were charging, this soldier rushed out and seized it, exposing himself to the fire of both sides." |
| — | James R. Durham | Second Lieutenant | 12th West Virginia Infantry | June 14, 1863 | March 6, 1890 | "Second Lieutenant Durham led his command over the stone wall, where he was wounded." (at the Second Battle of Winchester) |
| | Richard Enderlin | Musician | 73rd Ohio Infantry | July 1 – July 3, 1863 | September 11, 1897 | "Voluntarily took a rifle and served as a soldier in the ranks during the first and second days of the battle. Voluntarily and at his own imminent peril went into the enemy's lines at night and, under a sharp fire, rescued a wounded comrade." |
| | Benjamin Falls* | Color Sergeant | 19th Massachusetts Infantry | July 3, 1863 | December 1, 1864 | "Capture of flag." (19th Virginia Infantry) |
| | John B. Fassett | Captain | 23rd Pennsylvania Infantry | July 2, 1863 | December 29, 1894 | "While acting as an aide, voluntarily led a regiment to the relief of a battery and recaptured its guns from the enemy." |
| — | Christopher Flynn | Corporal | 14th Connecticut Infantry | July 3, 1863 | December 1, 1864 | "Capture of flag of 52d North Carolina Infantry (C.S.A.)." |
| | Frederick Fuger | First Sergeant | Battery A, 4th U.S. Light Artillery | July 3, 1863 | August 24, 1897 | "All the officers of his battery having been killed or wounded and five of its guns disabled in Pickett's assault, he succeeded to the command and fought the remaining gun with most distinguished gallantry until the battery was ordered withdrawn." |
| | Chester S. Furman | Corporal | 6th Pennsylvania Reserves | July 2, 1863 | August 3, 1897 | "Was 1 of 6 volunteers who charged upon a log house near Devil's Den, where a squad of the enemy's sharpshooters were sheltered, and compelled their surrender." |
| | Edward L. Gilligan | First Sergeant | 88th Pennsylvania Infantry | July 1, 1863 | April 30, 1892 | "Assisted in the capture of a Confederate flag by knocking down the color sergeant." (23rd North Carolina Infantry) |
| — | John W. Hart | Sergeant | 6th Pennsylvania Reserves | July 2, 1863 | August 3, 1897 | "Was one of six volunteers who charged upon a log house near the Devil's Den, where a squad of the enemy's sharpshooters were sheltered, and compelled their surrender." |
| | William B. Hincks | Sergeant Major | 14th Connecticut Infantry | July 3, 1863 | December 1, 1864 | "During the high-water mark of Pickett's charge on 3 July 1863 the colors of the 14th Tenn. Inf. C.S.A. were planted 50 yards in front of the center of Sgt. Maj. Hincks' regiment." |
| | Charles M. Holton | First Sergeant | 7th Michigan Cavalry | July 14, 1863 | March 21, 1889 | "Capture of flag of 55th Virginia Infantry (C.S.A.). In the midst of the battle with foot soldiers he dismounted to capture the flag.." (at the Battle of Williamsport) |
| | Thomas Horan | Sergeant | 72nd New York Infantry | July 2, 1863 | April 5, 1898 | "In a charge of his regiment this soldier captured the regimental flag of the 8th Florida Infantry (C.S.A.)." |
| | Henry S. Huidekoper | Lieutenant Colonel | 150th Pennsylvania Infantry | July 1, 1863 | May 27, 1905 | "While engaged in repelling an attack of the enemy, received a severe wound of the right arm, but instead of retiring remained at the front in command of the regiment." |
| | Francis Irsch | Captain | 45th New York Infantry | July 1, 1863 | May 27, 1892 | "Gallantry in flanking the enemy and capturing a number of prisoners and in holding a part of the town against heavy odds while the Army was rallying on Cemetery Hill." |
| | Benjamin H. Jellison | Sergeant | 19th Massachusetts Infantry | July 3, 1863 | December 1, 1864 | "Capture of flag of 57th Virginia Infantry (C.S.A.). He also assisted in taking prisoners." |
| | Wallace W. Johnson | Sergeant | 6th Pennsylvania Reserves | July 2, 1863 | August 8, 1900 | "With five other volunteers gallantly charged on a number of the enemy's sharpshooters concealed in a log house, captured them, and brought them into the Union lines." |
| | Edward M. Knox | Second Lieutenant | 15th Battery, New York Light Artillery | July 2, 1863 | October 18, 1892 | "Held his ground with the battery after the other batteries had fallen back until compelled to draw his piece off by hand; he was severely wounded." |
| | John Lonergan | Captain | 13th Vermont Infantry | July 2, 1863 | October 28, 1893 | "Gallantry in the recapture of 4 guns and the capture of 2 additional guns from the enemy; also the capture of a number of prisoners." |
| — | John B. Mayberry | Private | 1st Delaware Infantry | July 3, 1863 | December 6, 1864 | "Captured the enemy flag." (7th North Carolina Infantry) |
| — | Bernard McCarren | Private | 1st Delaware Infantry | July 3, 1863 | December 1, 1864 | "Capture of flag." (13th Alabama Infantry) |
| | George W. Mears | Sergeant | 6th Pennsylvania Reserves | July 2, 1863 | February 16, 1897 | "With five volunteers he gallantly charged on a number of the enemy's sharpshooters concealed in a log house, captured them, and brought them into the Union lines." |
| — | John G. Miller | Corporal | 8th Ohio Infantry | July 3, 1863 | December 1, 1864 | "for capture of 2 flags" (34th North Carolina Infantry & 38th Virginia Infantry) |
| | William E. Miller | Captain | 3rd Pennsylvania Cavalry | July 3, 1863 | July 21, 1897 | "Without orders, led a charge of his squadron upon the flank of the enemy, checked his attack, and cut off and dispersed the rear of his column." |
| | Harvey M. Munsell | Sergeant | 99th Pennsylvania Infantry | July 1 – July 3, 1863 | February 5, 1866 | "Gallant and courageous conduct as color bearer. (This noncommissioned officer carried the colors of his regiment through 13 engagements.)" |
| | Henry D. O'Brien | Corporal | 1st Minnesota Infantry | July 3, 1863 | April 9, 1890 | "Taking up the colors where they had fallen, he rushed ahead of his regiment, close to the muzzles of the enemy's guns, and engaged in the desperate struggle in which the enemy was defeated, and though severely wounded, he held the colors until wounded a second time." |
| — | John Patterson | Principal Musician | 122nd Ohio Infantry | June 14, 1863 | May 13, 1899 | "With one companion, voluntarily went in front of the Union lines, under a heavy fire from the enemy, and carried back a helpless, wounded comrade, thus saving him from death or capture." (at the Second Battle of Winchester) |
| | James Pipes | Captain | 140th Pennsylvania Infantry | July 2, 1863 & August 25, 1864 | April 5, 1898 | "While a sergeant and retiring with his company before the rapid advance of the enemy at Gettysburg, he and a companion stopped and carried to a place of safety a wounded and helpless comrade; in this act both he and his companion were severely wounded. A year later, at Reams Station, Virginia, while commanding a skirmish line, voluntarily assisted in checking a flank movement of the enemy, and while so doing was severely wounded, suffering the loss of an arm." |
| | George C. Platt | Private | 6th U.S. Cavalry | July 3, 1863 | July 12, 1895 | "Seized the regimental flag upon the death of the standard bearer in a hand-to-hand fight and prevented it from falling into the hands of the enemy." (at the Battle of Fairfield) |
| | James P. Postles | Captain | 1st Delaware Infantry | July 2, 1863 | July 22, 1892 | "Voluntarily delivered an order in the face of heavy fire of the enemy." |
| | James J. Purman | First Lieutenant | 140th Pennsylvania Infantry | July 2, 1863 | October 30, 1896 | "Voluntarily assisted a wounded comrade to a place of apparent safety while the enemy were in close proximity; he received the fire of the enemy and a wound which resulted in the amputation of his left leg." |
| | William H. Raymond | Corporal | 108th New York Infantry | July 3, 1863 | March 10, 1896 | "Voluntarily and under a severe fire brought a box of ammunition to his comrades on the skirmish line." |
| | Charles W. Reed | Bugler | 9th Battery, Massachusetts Light Artillery | July 2, 1863 | August 16, 1895 | "Rescued his wounded captain from between the lines." |
| | J. Monroe Reisinger | Corporal | 150th Pennsylvania Infantry | July 1, 1863 | January 25, 1907 | "Specially brave and meritorious conduct in the face of the enemy. Awarded under Act of Congress, January 25, 1907." |
| | Edmund Rice | Major | 19th Massachusetts Infantry | July 3, 1863 | October 6, 1891 | "Conspicuous bravery on the third day of the battle on the countercharge against Pickett's division where he fell severely wounded within the enemy's lines." |
| — | James Richmond* | Private | 8th Ohio Infantry | July 3, 1863 | December 1, 1864 | "Capture of flag." |
| | Elbridge Robinson | Private | 122nd Ohio Infantry | June 14, 1863 | April 5, 1898 | "With one companion, Private Robinson voluntarily went in front of the Union line, under a heavy fire from the enemy, and carried back a helpless, wounded comrade, thus saving him from death or capture." (at the Second Battle of Winchester) |
| — | John H. Robinson | Private | 19th Massachusetts Infantry | July 3, 1863 | December 1, 1864 | "Capture of flag of 57th Virginia Infantry (C.S.A.)." |
| — | Oliver P. Rood | Private | 20th Indiana Infantry | July 3, 1863 | December 1, 1864 | "Capture of flag of 21st North Carolina Infantry Regiment." |
| | George W. Roosevelt | First Sergeant | 26th Pennsylvania Infantry | August 30, 1862 & July 2, 1863 | July 2, 1897 | "At Bull Run, Virginia, recaptured the colors, which had been seized by the enemy. At Gettysburg captured a Confederate color bearer and color, in which effort he was severely wounded." (2nd Florida Infantry) |
| | J. Levi Roush | Corporal | 6th Pennsylvania Reserves | July 2, 1863 | August 3, 1897 | "Was 1 of 6 volunteers who charged upon a log house near the Devil's Den, where a squad of the enemy's sharpshooters were sheltered, and compelled their surrender." |
| | James M. Rutter | Sergeant | 143rd Pennsylvania Infantry | July 1, 1863 | October 30, 1896 | "At great risk of his life went to the assistance of a wounded comrade, and while under fire removed him to a place of safety." |
| — | Martin Schwenk | Sergeant | 6th U.S. Cavalry | July 3, 1863 | April 23, 1889 | "...for bravery in an attempt to carry a communication through the enemy's lines. Sergeant Schwenk also rescued an officer from the hands of the enemy." (at the Battle of Fairfield) |
| | Alfred J. Sellers | Major | 90th Pennsylvania Infantry | July 1, 1863 | July 21, 1894 | "Voluntarily led the regiment under a withering fire to a position from which the enemy was repulsed." |
| — | Marshall Sherman | Private | 1st Minnesota Infantry | July 3, 1863 | December 1, 1864 | "Capture of flag of 28th Virginia Infantry (C.S.A.)." |
| | Daniel E. Sickles | Major General | III Corps | July 2, 1863 | October 30, 1897 | "Displayed most conspicuous gallantry on the field vigorously contesting the advance of the enemy and continuing to encourage his troops after being himself severely wounded." |
| — | Thaddeus S. Smith | Corporal | 6th Pennsylvania Reserves | July 2, 1863 | May 5, 1900 | "Was 1 of 6 volunteers who charged upon a log house near the Devil's Den, where a squad of the enemy's sharpshooters were sheltered, and compelled their surrender." |
| | Charles Stacey | Private | 55th Ohio Infantry | July 2, 1863 | June 23, 1896 | "Voluntarily took an advanced position on the skirmish line for the purpose of ascertaining the location of Confederate sharpshooters, and under heavy fire held the position thus taken until the company of which he was a member went back to the main line. " |
| | James B. Thompson | Sergeant | 1st Pennsylvania Rifles | July 3, 1863 | December 1, 1864 | "Capture of flag of 15th Georgia Infantry (C.S.A.)." |
| — | Andrew J. Tozier | Sergeant | 20th Maine Infantry | July 2, 1863 | August 13, 1898 | "At the crisis of the engagement this soldier, a color bearer, stood alone in an advanced position, the regiment having been borne back, and defended his colors with musket and ammunition picked up at his feet." |
| | Wheelock G. Veazey | Colonel | 16th Vermont Infantry | July 3, 1863 | September 8, 1891 | "Rapidly assembled his regiment and charged the enemy's flank; charged front under heavy fire, and charged and destroyed a Confederate brigade, all this with new troops in their first battle." |
| — | Jerry Wall | Private | 126th New York Infantry | July 3, 1863 | December 1, 1864 | "Capture of flag." |
| — | Francis A. Wallar | Corporal | 6th Wisconsin Infantry | July 1, 1863 | December 1, 1864 | "Capture of flag of 2nd Mississippi Infantry (C.S.A.)." |
| | Alexander S. Webb | Brigadier General | Philadelphia Brigade | July 3, 1863 | September 28, 1891 | "Distinguished personal gallantry in leading his men forward at a critical period in the contest." |
| | William Wells | Major | 1st Vermont Cavalry | July 3, 1863 | September 8, 1891 | "Led the second battalion of his regiment in a daring charge." |
| — | James Wiley | Sergeant | 59th New York Infantry | July 3, 1863 | December 1, 1864 | "Capture of flag of a Georgia regiment." (48th Georgia Infantry, captured on July 2) |

== See also ==
- Battle of Gettysburg
- List of American Civil War Medal of Honor recipients
