= James Richmond =

James Richmond may refer to:

- James Buchanan Richmond (1842–1910), U.S. Representative from Virginia
- James Theodore Richmond (1890–1975), American writer, conservationist, preacher and librarian
- James Crowe Richmond (1822–1898), New Zealand politician, engineer and watercolourist
- James Richmond (footballer, born 1858) (1858–1898), Scottish international footballer
- James Richmond (Paralympic footballer) (born 1980), British football player in the 2012 Paralympic Games
- James Richmond (Medal of Honor) (1843–1864), Union Army soldier and Medal of Honor recipient
