= John Fassett =

John Fassett may refer to:

- John Fassett Jr., settler of Vermont and judge
- John Barclay Fassett, American Civil War soldier and Medal of Honor recipient
