= Christopher Flynn (Medal of Honor) =

Medal of Honor recipient (1828–1889)

- Born: December 15, 1829; Ireland
- Died: October 15, 1889 (aged 59); Sprague, Connecticut
- Burial place: Saint Marys Cemetery
- Military career
- Allegiance: United States of America
- Branch: United States Army
- Service years: 1862 - 1865
- Rank: Corporal
- Unit: 14th Connecticut Infantry Regiment
- Conflicts: Battle of Gettysburg
- Awards: Medal of Honor

Christopher Flynn (December 1828 – October 15, 1889) was an Irish soldier who fought in the American Civil War with the 14th Connecticut Infantry, Company K. Flynn received the United States' highest award for bravery during combat, the Medal of Honor, for his action during the Battle of Gettysburg in Pennsylvania on 3 July 1863. He was honored with the award on 1 December 1864.

== Biography ==
Flynn was born in Ireland on December 15, 1829. He enlisted with the 14th Connecticut Infantry Regiment in August 1862, and mustered out in May 1865. He died on 15 October 1889 and his remains are interred at the Saint Marys Cemetery in Connecticut. During Gettysburg, he captured the flag of the 52nd North Carolina.

== Medal of Honor citation ==
The President of the United States of America, in the name of Congress, takes pleasure in presenting the Medal of Honor to Corporal Christopher Flynn, United States Army, for extraordinary heroism on 3 July 1863, while serving with Company K, 14th Connecticut Infantry, in action at Gettysburg, Pennsylvania, for capture of flag of 52d North Carolina Infantry (Confederate States of America).

== See also ==
- List of Medal of Honor recipients for the Battle of Gettysburg
- List of American Civil War Medal of Honor recipients: A–F
