= James Wiley =

James Wiley may refer to:

- James S. Wiley, U.S. Representative from Maine
- James T. Wiley, U.S. Army Air Corps/U.S. Air Force Officer and member of the Tuskegee Airmen
- James Wiley (Medal of Honor), Union soldier during the American Civil War, recipient of the Medal of Honor
- James Franklin Wiley, member of the Wisconsin State Senate
- Jim Wiley, Canadian ice hockey player and coach

== See also ==
- James Willey, composer
- Sir James Wylie, military doctor
