= Elijah W. Bacon =

Union Army Medal of Honor recipient

- Born: c. 1836; Burlington, Connecticut, U.S.
- Died: May 6, 1864; Virginia, U.S.
- Burial place: Maple Cemetery, Berlin, Connecticut
- Military career
- Allegiance: United States of America
- Branch: United States Army: Union Army
- Service years: 1862 - 1864
- Rank: Private
- Unit: 14th Regiment Connecticut Volunteer Infantry
- Conflicts: American Civil War: Battle of Gettysburg; Battle of the Wilderness
- Awards: Medal of Honor

Elijah William Bacon (c. 1836 – May 6, 1864) was an American soldier who received the Medal of Honor for valor during the American Civil War.

== Biography ==
Bacon joined the 14th Connecticut Infantry in July 1862. During Pickett's Charge on 3 July 1863, Bacon captured the battleflag of the 16th North Carolina Infantry. He was killed on 6 May 1864 at the Battle of the Wilderness, and received the Medal of Honor posthumously on 1 December 1864.

== Medal of Honor citation ==
Citation:

Capture of flag of 16th North Carolina regiment.

== See also ==
- List of Medal of Honor recipients for the Battle of Gettysburg
- List of American Civil War Medal of Honor recipients: A–F
