= Hugh Carey (soldier) =

American Civil War Medal of Honor recipient

- Born: 1841; Ireland
- Died: 1886 (aged 44–45); New York
- Military career
- Allegiance: United States of America
- Branch: United States Army
- Rank: Sergeant
- Unit: (New York (state)) 82nd Regiment New York Volunteer Infantry
- Conflicts: Battle of Gettysburg
- Awards: Medal of Honor

Hugh Carey (1840–1886) was a soldier in the Union Army during the American Civil War. He was awarded the Medal of Honor for his bravery at the Battle of Gettysburg on 2 July 1863. He acted with daring by capturing the flag of the 7th Virginia Infantry, and was twice wounded in the act.

Carey was born in Ireland. He enlisted in the army from New York City in April 1861. He served as a sergeant in the 82nd New York Volunteer Infantry Regiment, and was discharged in May 1864.

== See also ==
- List of Medal of Honor recipients for the Battle of Gettysburg
- List of American Civil War Medal of Honor recipients: A–F
