= Lewis A. Rounds =

Brevet Major Lewis A. Rounds
- Born: 7 June 1843; Cattaraugus County, New York
- Died: 1 May 1916 (aged 72); Milwaukee, Wisconsin
- Burial place: Wood National Cemetery, Milwaukee
- Military career
- Allegiance: United States (Union)
- Branch: Army
- Service years: 1861-1865
- Rank: Brevet Major
- Units: Company D, 8th Ohio Infantry
- Conflicts: Battle of Spotsylvania Court House
- Awards: Medal of Honor

Lewis A. Rounds (7 June 1843 – 1 May 1916) was a Brevet Major of the United States Army who was awarded the Medal of Honor for gallantry during the American Civil War. Rounds was awarded the medal on 1 December 1864 for actions performed at the Battle of Spotsylvania Court House in May 1864.

== Personal life ==
Rounds was born on 7 June 1843 in Cattaraugus County, New York. He married Maria Allbaugh in 1865. He died in Milwaukee, Wisconsin on 1 May 1916 and was buried in Wood National Cemetery in Milwaukee.

== Military service ==
Rounds enlisted in the Army as a private at Norwalk, Ohio on 13 June 1861 and was assigned to Company D of the 8th Ohio Infantry. On 24 June 1864 he was transferred to Company B of the same unit. He was promoted to 1st lieutenant on 1 August 1864 before being transferred to Field & Staff on 6 September of the same year. He was then promoted to adjutant on 26 September 1864 before being transferred to Company C on 20 December 1864 as a captain. He was promoted to Brevet Major on 13 March 1865.

On 12 May 1864, at the Battle of Spotsylvania Court House, Rounds (still a private) captured an unspecified Confederate flag, which earned him the Medal of Honor. His medal citation reads:

The President of the United States of America, in the name of Congress, takes pleasure in presenting the Medal of Honor to Private Lewis A. Rounds, United States Army, for extraordinary heroism on 12 May 1864, while serving with Company D, 8th Ohio Infantry, in action at Spotsylvania, Virginia, for capture of flag.

— E. M. Stanton

Rounds was mustered out of the Army on 12 July 1865. His Medal of Honor is accredited to Ohio.
