= Morris Brown Jr. =

Medal of Honor recipient (1842–1864)

- Born: August 1842; Hammondsport, New York
- Died: June 22, 1864 (aged 21); Petersburg, Virginia
- Burial place: Lake View Cemetery (Penn Yan, New York)
- Military career
- Allegiance: United States of America
- Branch: United States Army; Union Army
- Service years: 1862 - 1864
- Rank: Captain
- Unit: (New York (state)) 126th Regiment New York Volunteer Infantry Regiment - Company A
- Conflicts: Battle of Gettysburg; Siege of Petersburg
- Awards: Medal of Honor

Morris Brown Jr. (August, 1842 – June 22, 1864) was an American soldier who received the Medal of Honor for valor during the American Civil War.

== Biography ==
Brown was attending Hamilton College when he joined the Union Army in August 1862. At Hamilton he was a member of Chi Psi fraternity. He served in the 126th New York Infantry, and by the time of his death was, as a captain, the senior living officer of his regiment. He was killed in action on June 22, 1864, at Petersburg, Virginia. He was posthumously awarded the Medal of Honor on March 6, 1869, for his actions at the Battle of Gettysburg which included the capture of a large number of Confederates as well as the heroic capture of a Confederate flag.

A book detailing his exploits during the Civil War was released in 2012 and is entitled "Fight All Day, March All Night" by Wayne Mahood.

Two other men of the 126th New York Infantry won the Medal of Honor for their actions at Gettysburg, Jerry Wall and George H. Dore.

== Medal of Honor citation ==
Citation:

Capture of flag.

== See also ==
- List of Medal of Honor recipients for the Battle of Gettysburg
- List of American Civil War Medal of Honor recipients: A–F
