= James B. Thompson =

Medal of Honor recipient (1843–1875)

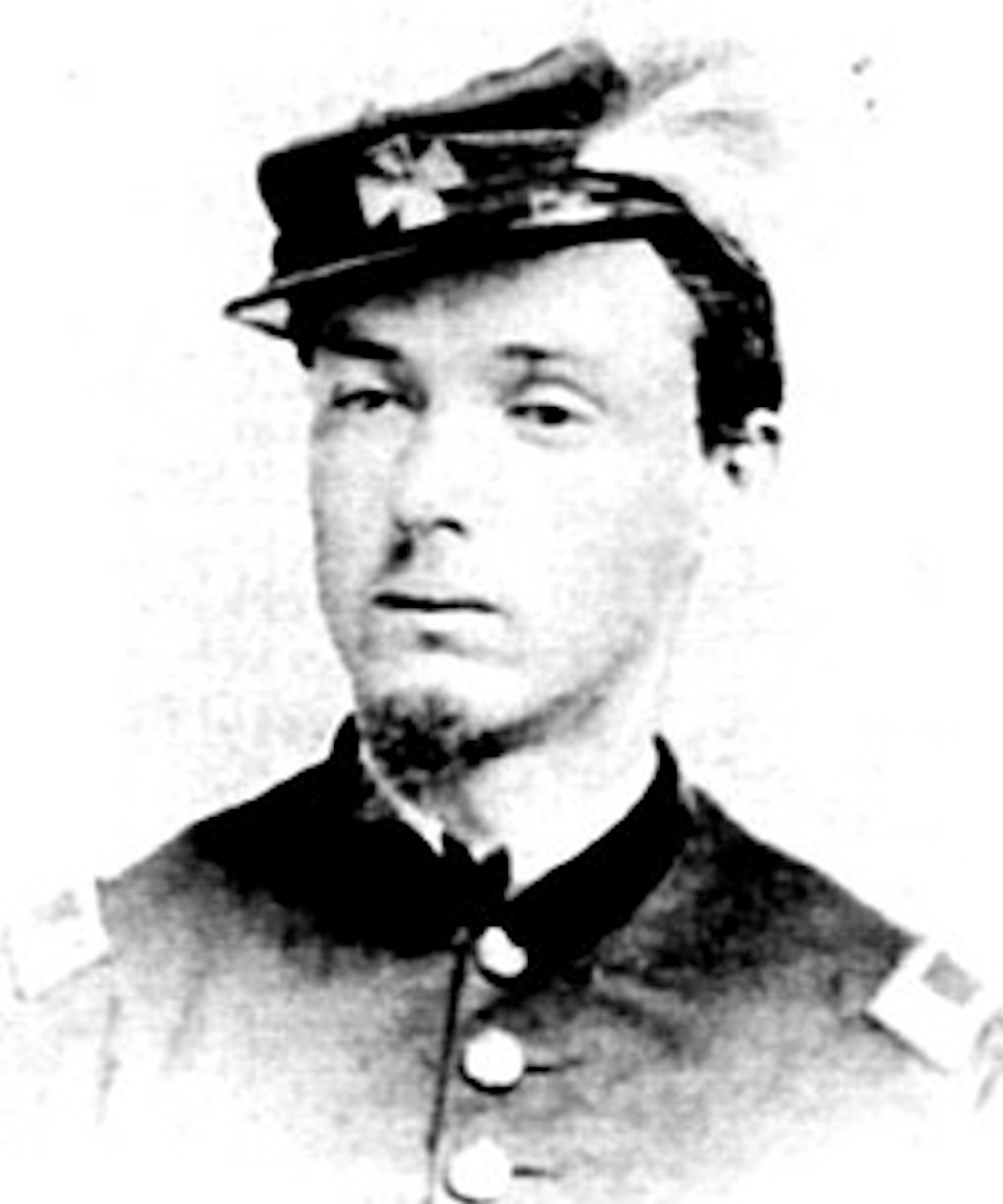
- Born: 1843; Juniata County, Pennsylvania, U.S.
- Died: August 31, 1875 (aged 31–32); Port Royal, Pennsylvania, U.S.
- Burial place: Port Royal, Pennsylvania
- Military career
- Allegiance: United States of America
- Branch: United States Army
- Rank: Captain; Brevet Major
- Units: Company G, 1st Pennsylvania Rifles; 190th Pennsylvania Infantry Regiment
- Conflicts: Battle of Gettysburg; American Civil War
- Awards: Medal of Honor

James B. Thompson (1843 – August 31, 1875) was an American soldier who fought in the American Civil War. Thompson received his country's highest award for bravery during combat, the Medal of Honor. Thompson's medal was won for capturing the flag of the Confederate's 15th Georgia Infantry at the Battle of Gettysburg on July 3, 1863. He was honored with the award on December 1, 1864.

Thompson was born in Juniata County, Pennsylvania, entered service in Perrysville, and was later buried in Port Royal, Pennsylvania.

== Medal of Honor citation ==
The President of the United States of America, in the name of Congress, takes pleasure in presenting the Medal of Honor to Sergeant James B. Thompson, United States Army, for extraordinary heroism on 3 July 1863, while serving with Company G, 1st Pennsylvania Rifles, in action at Gettysburg, Pennsylvania, for capture of flag of 15th Georgia Infantry (Confederate States of America).

== See also ==
- List of Medal of Honor recipients for the Battle of Gettysburg
- List of American Civil War Medal of Honor recipients: T–Z
