= George W. Roosevelt =

American Medal of Honor recipient (1843–1907)

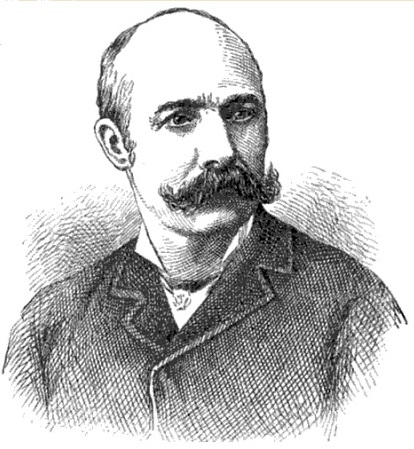
- Born: February 14, 1843; Chester County, Pennsylvania, U.S.
- Died: April 14, 1907 (aged 64); Brussels, Belgium
- Burial place: Oak Hill Cemetery; Washington, D.C., U.S.
- Relatives: Roosevelt family
- Military career
- Allegiance: United States; Union
- Branch: United States Army; Union Army
- Rank: First Sergeant; Captain (Brevet)
- Unit: Company K. 26th Pennsylvania Infantry Regiment
- Conflicts: American Civil War; Second Battle of Bull Run; Battle of Gettysburg

Brevet Captain George Washington Roosevelt (February 14, 1843 – April 14, 1907), received the Medal of Honor for heroism during the American Civil War.

== Biography ==
George Washington Roosevelt was born in Chester County, Pennsylvania, in 1843. He was the fourth son of James S. Roosevelt and his wife Esther Vickery.

=== Civil War ===
Following the outbreak of the American Civil War, Roosevelt enlisted as a corporal in Company K of the 26th Pennsylvania Infantry on May 1, 1861, at age 17.

He was promoted to sergeant on September 1, 1862.

He had risen to first sergeant of Company K by the time of the Battle of Gettysburg in July, 1863 during which, he was severely wounded. As a result of this wound his left leg was amputated. He was honorably discharged from the Army at Philadelphia on March 14, 1864.

In recognition of his war service, Roosevelt received a brevet promotion to captain.

=== Later life ===
He married Ida Mae Goldberg (1855-1926) on 14 Mar 1874 at Washington, DC.

Following the war, Roosevelt had a 30-year career as a diplomat with the United States Department of State. He was the U.S. Consular Agent in Sydney, Australia, from 1877 to 1878. He was then U.S. Consul in Auckland, New Zealand, from 1878 to 1879; Saint Helena from 1879 to 1880; Matanzas from 1880 to 1881; Bordeaux, France, from 1881 to 1889 and Brussels, Belgium, from 1889 to 1902. His final posting was as the U.S. Consul General in Brussels in 1906.

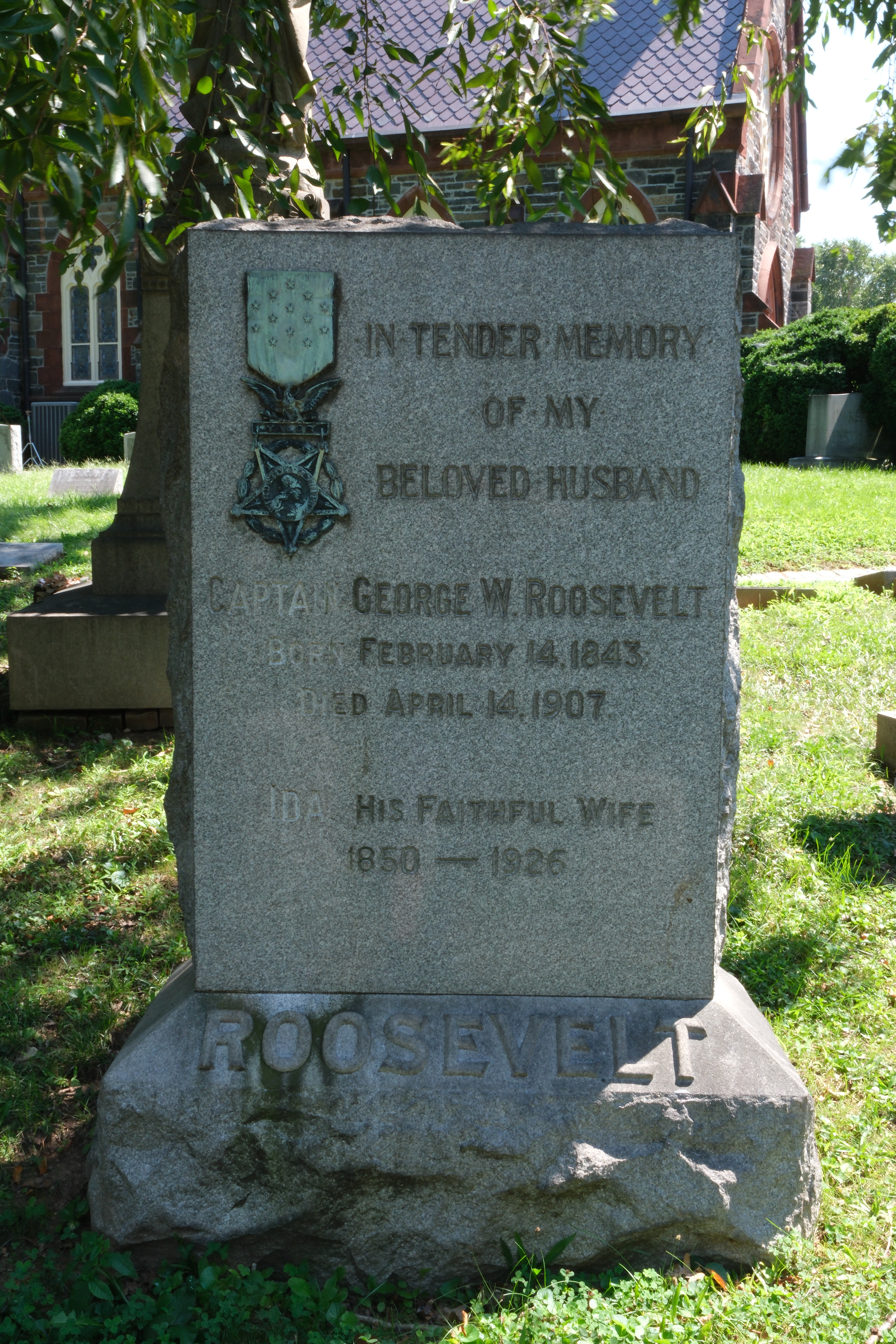
Grave of Roosevelt at Oak Hill Cemetery

Captain Roosevelt died in Brussels in 1907 at the age of 63. He is buried with his wife in Oak Hill Cemetery in Washington, D.C.

In May 2003, Captain Roosevelt's Medal of Honor was put up for auction on eBay. The seller was arrested in July 2003 and the medal was confiscated by the Federal Bureau of Investigation alongside the medal awarded to Robert Blume. They were donated to the Congressional Medal of Honor Society in May 2004.

== Medal of Honor citation ==
For extraordinary heroism while serving with Company K, 26th Pennsylvania Infantry. At Bull Run, Virginia, on 30 August 1862, First Sergeant Roosevelt recaptured the colors, which had been seized by the enemy. At Gettysburg, Pennsylvania, on 2 July 1863, he captured a Confederate Color Bearer and color, during this heroic effort he was severely wounded.

Date of Issue: July 2, 1887

== See also ==
- List of Medal of Honor recipients for the Battle of Gettysburg
- List of American Civil War Medal of Honor recipients: Q–S
