= Harrison Clark (Medal of Honor) =

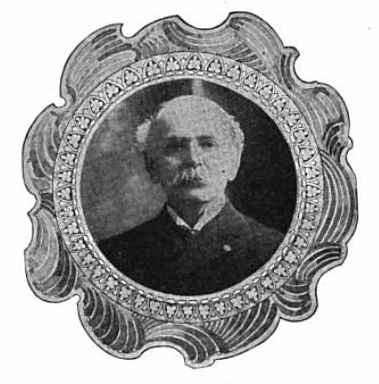
- Born: April 10, 1842; Chatham, New York
- Died: April 18, 1913 (aged 71); Albany, New York
- Burial place: Albany Rural Cemetery
- Military career
- Allegiance: United States of America
- Branch: United States Army
- Service years: August 27, 1862 to September 4, 1865
- Rank: Corporal
- Unit: (New York (state)) 125th Regiment New York Volunteer Infantry - Company E
- Awards: Medal of Honor

Corporal Harrison Clark (April 10, 1842 to April 18, 1913) was an American soldier who fought in the American Civil War. Clark received the country's highest award for bravery during combat, the Medal of Honor, for his action during the Battle of Gettysburg in Pennsylvania on 2 July 1863. He was honored with the award on 11 June 1895.

== Biography ==
Clark was born in Chatham, New York on 10 April 1842. Before the onset of the Civil War, he was a carriage maker.

He enlisted into the 125th New York Infantry. On 2 July 1863, he performed an act of bravery during the Battle of Gettysburg that earned him the Medal of Honor award. After this event, he was promoted to color sergeant. Clark also participated in the Battle of the Wilderness in May 1864. Despite being shot in the leg, he kept on fighting, an act which led to his field promotion to 2nd Lieutenant. He mustered out of the service on 4 September 1865, at the conclusion of the war.

Clark married Harriet Emeline Johnson, with whom he had three children. Following the war, he was a proprietor at an opera house. He was later Keeper of the Bureau of Military Services. He died on 18 April 1913, and his remains are interred at the Albany Rural Cemetery in New York.

== Medal of Honor citation ==
Seized the colors and advanced with them after the color bearer had been shot.

== See also ==
- List of Medal of Honor recipients for the Battle of Gettysburg
- List of American Civil War Medal of Honor recipients: A–F
