= Jerry Wall =

Medal of Honor recipient (1841–1930)

- Born: July 1, 1841; Geneva, New York
- Died: April 8, 1930 (aged 88); Dansville, New York, U.S.
- Burial place: Green Mount Cemetery, Dansville, Livingston County, New York
- Military career
- Allegiance: United States of America
- Branch: United States Army
- Rank: Private
- Units: Company B, 126th New York Infantry
- Conflicts: American Civil War; Battle of Gettysburg
- Awards: Medal of Honor

Jerry C. Wall (July 1, 1841 - April 8, 1930) was a Union Army soldier in the American Civil War who received the U.S. military's highest decoration, the Medal of Honor.

Wall was born in Geneva, New York, and he entered service in Milo. Wall was awarded the Medal of Honor for his actions at the Battle of Gettysburg on July 3, 1863, when he captured a Confederate Army flag as a private with Company B of the 126th New York Infantry. Two other men of the 126th New York Infantry were awarded the Medal of Honor for their actions at Gettysburg, Morris Brown Jr. and George H. Dore.

His Medal of Honor was issued on December 1, 1864.

== Medal of Honor citation ==
The President of the United States of America, in the name of Congress, takes pleasure in presenting the Medal of Honor to Private Jerry C. Wall, United States Army, for extraordinary heroism on 3 July 1863, while serving with Company B, 126th New York Infantry, in action at Gettysburg, Pennsylvania, for capture of flag.

== See also ==
- List of Medal of Honor recipients for the Battle of Gettysburg
- List of American Civil War Medal of Honor recipients: T–Z
