= Nathaniel M. Allen =

Medal of Honor recipient (1840–1900)

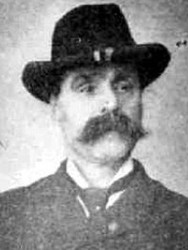
- Born: April 20, 1840; Boston, Massachusetts, U.S.
- Died: July 30, 1900 (aged 60); Massachusetts, U.S.
- Burial place: Woodlawn Cemetery, Acton, Massachusetts
- Military career
- Allegiance: United States of America
- Branch: United States Army
- Service years: 23 May 1861 – 24 May 1864
- Rank: Corporal
- Unit: 1st Regiment Massachusetts Volunteer Infantry
- Conflicts: American Civil War: Battle of Gettysburg
- Awards: Medal of Honor

Nathaniel M. Allen (April 20, 1840 — July 30, 1900) was an American soldier who fought in the American Civil War. He was awarded the Medal of Honor - the United States' highest award for bravery during combat - for his actions at the Battle of Gettysburg. He was presented the award in 1899, a year before he died.

== Early life ==
Allen was born in Boston, Massachusetts, on April 20, 1840. His father, Gaius Allen, who came from Acton, was a former soldier who served in the Davis Blues Regiment during the War of 1812. As a young man, Allen worked in Boston as a watchmaker. When the civil war broke out on April 12, 1861, he immediately enlisted into the 1st Regiment Massachusetts Volunteer Infantry as a Private, on May 22, 1861, aged 21. In April 1862, he was promoted to Corporal of the Color Guard and maintained the rank for the rest of his military career.

== Battle of Gettysburg ==
The Battle of Gettysburg began on July 1, 1863, and lasted until July 3, 1863. It was considered the turning point in the Civil War. It also created the highest number of casualties of the Civil War, with 23,055 Union troops killed, missing in action or wounded; and 23,231 Confederate casualties.

Allen's battle started on July 2, one day into the battle. In the afternoon of that day, his regiment came under heavy small-arms fire from advancing Confederate infantry. In the midst of the fight, he was given the Regiment's U.S. flag from his wounded ensign William Eaton. Allen's commander then ordered the regiment to retreat from the advancing Confederates. Whilst retreating, Allen saw Sergeant William Kelren shot and killed - dropping the regimental flag beneath him. Allen immediately retrieved the flag from underneath Kelren's body. He then ran back to his retreating regiment carrying both flags safely from the battlefield. It was for this action he was awarded the Medal of Honor. More than half of Allen's regiment was killed or wounded in the battle.

== Later years ==
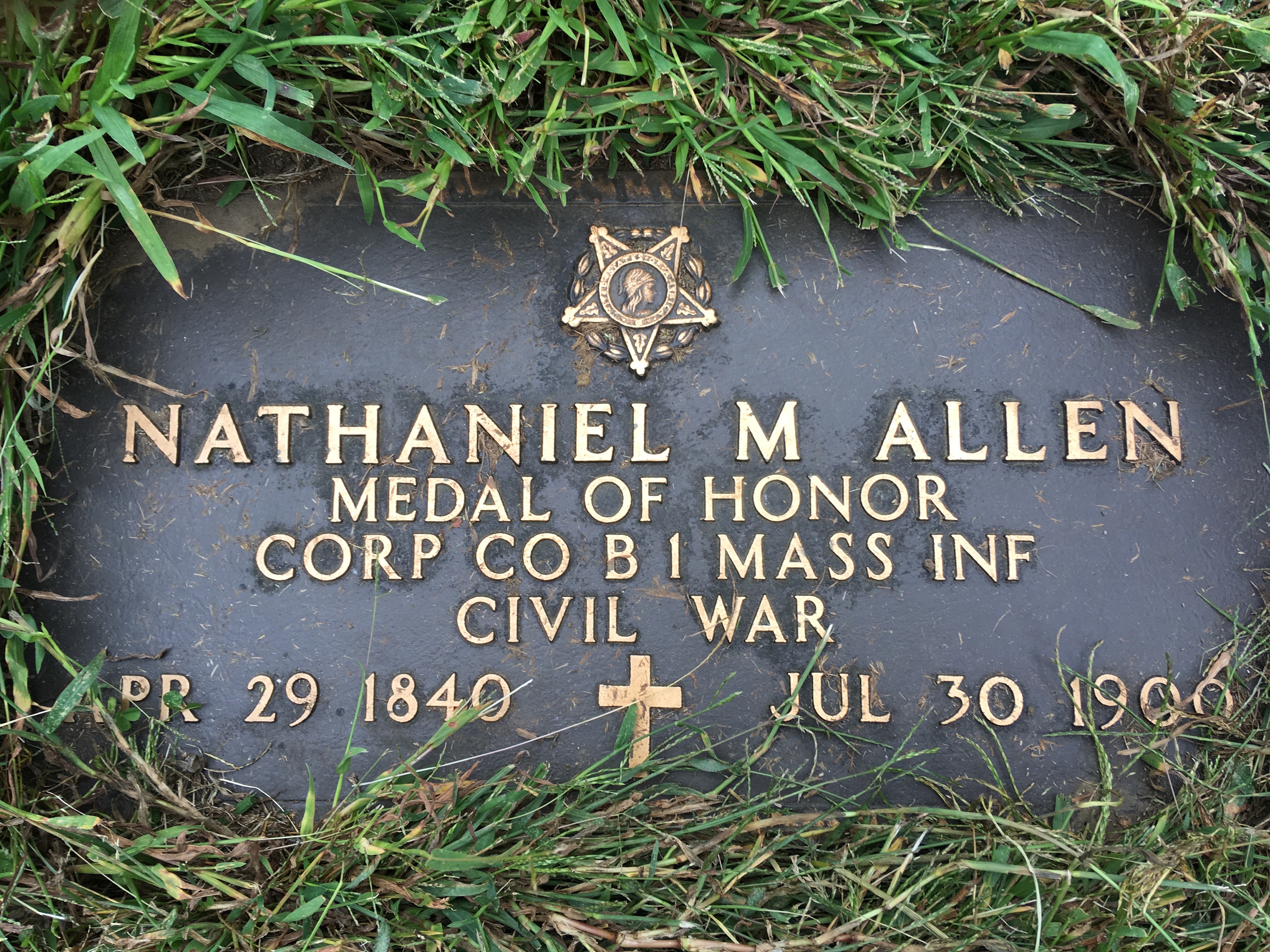
Grave marker in the Acton Woodlawn Cemetery

After the Civil War ended, Allen returned to Boston, where he continued his old trade as a watchmaker. Several years later, however, his eyesight began to fail, making it impossible to work as a watchmaker. He then moved in with his sisters in South Acton, where he lived for the rest of his life. Allen was awarded his Medal of Honor on 29 March 1899, 36 years after the Battle of Gettysburg.

Allen died from nervous exhaustion and heart disease a year later, on July 30, 1900, at age 60. He was buried in Woodlawn Cemetery in Acton.

== See also ==
- List of Medal of Honor recipients for the Battle of Gettysburg
- List of American Civil War Medal of Honor recipients: A–F

== Bibliography ==
- Rawley, James A (1966), Turning Points of the Civil War, Lincoln: University of Nebraska Press, ISBN 0-8032-8935-9
- Busey, John W; Martin, David G (2005), Regimental Strengths and Losses at Gettysburg (4th ed.), Hightstown, NJ: Longstreet House, ISBN 0-944413-67-6
- Hosmer, Henry L (2001), The Town of Acton in the Civil War, 1861-1865, Tucson, AZ, OCLC 124040215
