= Joseph Pierce (soldier) =

Chinese-American soldier (1842–1916)

Joseph A. Pierce
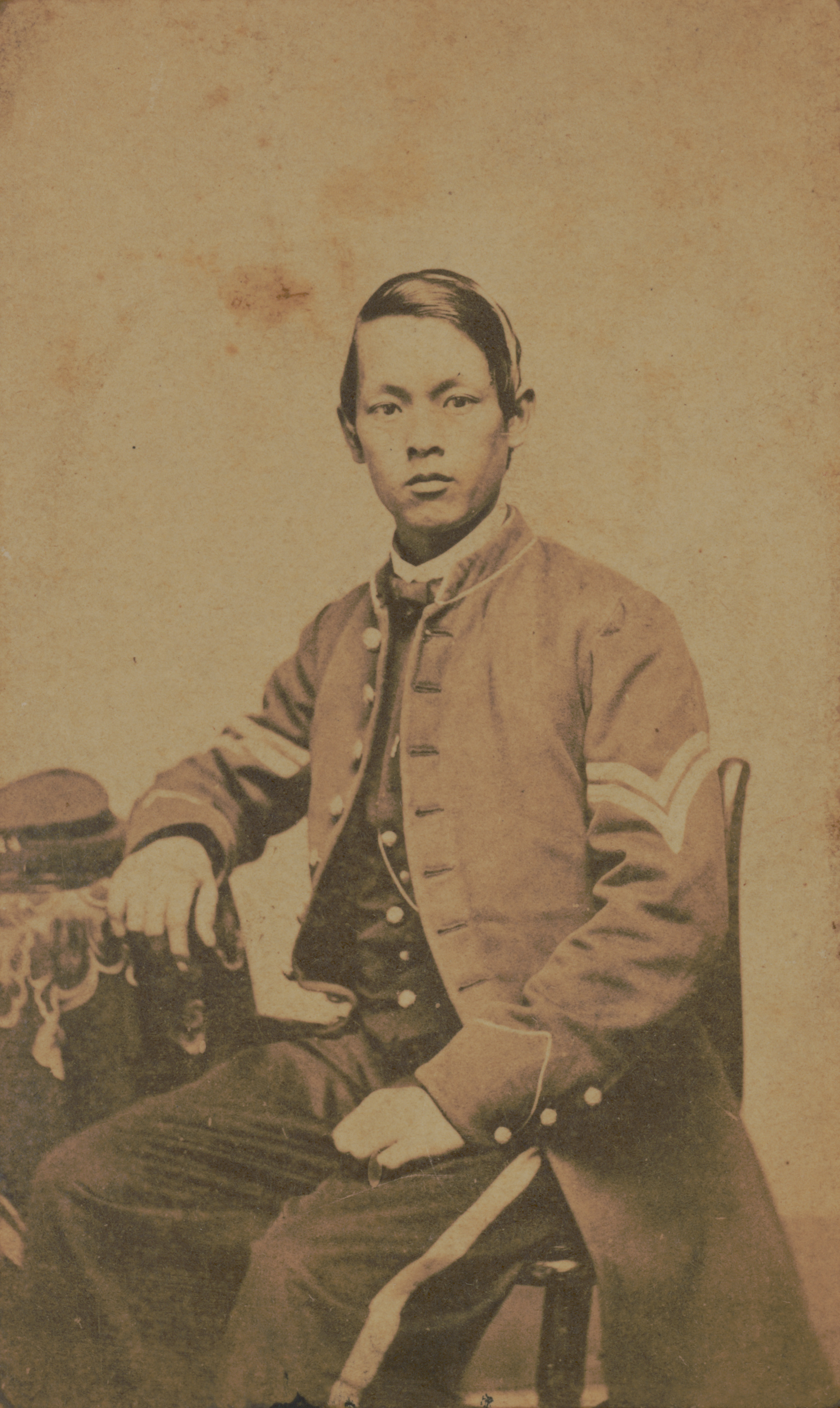
- Joseph Pierce in uniform during the Civil War
- Born: 1842; Guangdong, Qing Empire (now China)
- Died: January 3, 1916 (aged 73–74); Meriden, Connecticut, US
- Burial place: Walnut Grove Cemetery, Meriden
- Military career
- Allegiance: United States
- Branch: Union army
- Service years: 1862–1865
- Rank: Corporal
- Unit: 14th Connecticut Infantry Regiment
- Conflicts: American Civil War: Battle of Antietam (WIA); Battle of Chancellorsville; Battle of Gettysburg

Joseph A. Pierce (Note: There is no consensus whether Pierce's middle initial was "A" or "L".) (1842 – January 3, 1916) was a Chinese-born American soldier who fought in the 14th Connecticut Infantry Regiment during the American Civil War and reached the rank of corporal. After the war, he returned to Connecticut, converted to Christianity, and worked as a silver engraver until his death in 1916.

== Biography ==
Joseph A. Pierce was born in Guangdong Province, China, in 1842, though the exact date of his birth is unclear. (Note: Pierce's enlistment record showed that he was born on May 10, 1842. However, his pension declaration shows November 16, 1842.) Amos Peck, an American ship captain from Berlin, Connecticut, brought Pierce to the United States in 1853. There are several versions of stories describing how Pierce arrived in the United States from China. One suggests that Pierce's father sold him for six dollars, while another indicates that Pierce's brother sold him for 50 to 60 dollars. His original Chinese name is not recorded; he was named "Joseph" because the crew of Peck's ship called him "Joe", and Pierce's last name came from Franklin Pierce, who was President of the United States in 1853. After he arrived in the US, Pierce lived together with the Peck family in Berlin, attended school and went to church.

=== Civil War ===
Pierce voluntarily enlisted on July 26, 1862, in New Britain, Connecticut. The recruiting officer described Pierce as 5 feet 5 inches (1.65 m) tall, with "black eyes, dark hair, and dark complexion". He was mustered into the 14th Connecticut Infantry Regiment, which left for Washington, D.C. on August 25 that year. In a 2019 journal article, Angela He observed that Pierce was able to enlist in a white regiment because he enlisted along with "community members that he grew up with", and concluded that he was racialized as white in terms of "greater social standing outside the war".

According to historian R. L. McCunn, Pierce fought at the Battle of Antietam, fell over a fence, and injured his back. He was sent to recover in a hospital in Alexandria, Virginia. In November and December, he became well enough to work at a convalescent camp, but in spring 1863, he went back to the hospital. He returned to his unit in May 1863 and participated in the Battle of Gettysburg. However, Irving D. Moy asserted that Pierce did not participate in the Battle of Antietam due to sickness, though he acknowledged that Pierce fought at Chancellorsville and Gettysburg.

Pierce was promoted to corporal on November 1, 1863. On February 9, 1864, he was sent back to New Haven for recruitment duties. He returned to his regiment in late 1864, and mustered out with them on May 31, 1865.

=== Post-war life ===
After Pierce was mustered out of state service on June 10, 1865, he first lived in New Britain as a farmer. He moved from New Britain to Meriden in 1868, and learned silver engraving in the next two years. He worked as a silver engraver for the rest of his life. On November 21, 1876, Pierce married Martha Morgan, an 18-year-old from Portland, Connecticut. They had one daughter and two sons. In the 1880 United States census, Pierce registered his race as "Chinese," but due to the 1882 Chinese Exclusion Act, he listed his race as "Japanese" for the 1890 census. The Pierce family attended the Trinity Methodist Episcopal Church in Meriden, where Pierce himself was baptized on November 6, 1892.

Pierce began to receive a pension around 1890, though an 1899 report from The New York Times stated that Pierce received his pension in 1891. Pierce petitioned to increase his pension due to his injuries and illnesses, which was not granted until 1907. He died on January 3, 1916, due to a combination of "the grippe" (influenza), arteriosclerosis, and chronic bronchitis. He was buried in Walnut Grove Cemetery, Meriden.

== Gallery ==
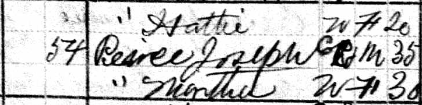
Pierce listed as Chinese on the 1880 census.

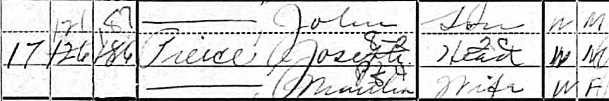
Pierce listed as "W" for white on the 1900 census.

Pierce listed as "Jp" for Japanese on the 1910 census.
