= George H. Dore =

English soldier who fought in the American Civil War

George H. Doré
- Born: June 24, 1845; Newport, Isle of Wight, England
- Died: March 8, 1927 (aged 81); Hornell, New York, US
- Burial place: Rural Cemetery
- Military career
- Allegiance: United States of America
- Branch: United States Army; Union Army
- Service years: 1862 - 1865
- Rank: Sergeant
- Unit: (New York (state)) 126th New York Volunteer Infantry - Company D
- Conflicts: Battle of Gettysburg
- Awards: Medal of Honor

Sergeant George Henry Doré (June 24, 1845 – February 8, 1927) was an English soldier who fought in the American Civil War. Doré received the United States' highest award for bravery during combat, the Medal of Honor, for his action during the Battle of Gettysburg in Pennsylvania on 3 July 1863. He was honored with the award on 1 December 1864.

== Biography ==
Doré was born on the Isle of Wight in England on 24 June 1845. He enlisted into the 126th New York Infantry from West Bloomfield, New York, on 22 August 1862. He was made prisoner following the Battle of Harpers Ferry, but paroled a day later. After his act of gallantry earned him the Medal of Honor on 3 July 1863 at the Battle of Gettysburg, he was promoted to corporal in December 1863 and sergeant in June 1864. He mustered out with his regiment on 3 June 1865. Two other men of the 126th New York Infantry won the Medal of Honor for their actions at Gettysburg, Morris Brown, Jr. and Jerry Wall.

Doré died on 8 February 1927, and his remains are interred at the Rural Cemetery in Hornell, New York.

== Medal of Honor citation ==
The colors being struck down by a shell as the enemy were charging, this soldier rushed out and seized it, exposing himself to the fire of both sides.

== See also ==
- List of Medal of Honor recipients for the Battle of Gettysburg
- List of American Civil War Medal of Honor recipients: A–F
