= 59th New York Infantry Regiment =

- Active: August 2, 1861 - June 30, 1865
- Country: United States
- Allegiance: Union
- Branch: United States Army
- Nickname(s): Union Guards
- Engagements: Battle of Antietam; Battle of Fredericksburg; Battle of Chancellorsville; Battle of Gettysburg; Battle of the Wilderness; Battle of Spotsylvania; Battle of Cold Harbor; Siege of Petersburg

Commanders
- Notable Commanders: Max A. Thoman

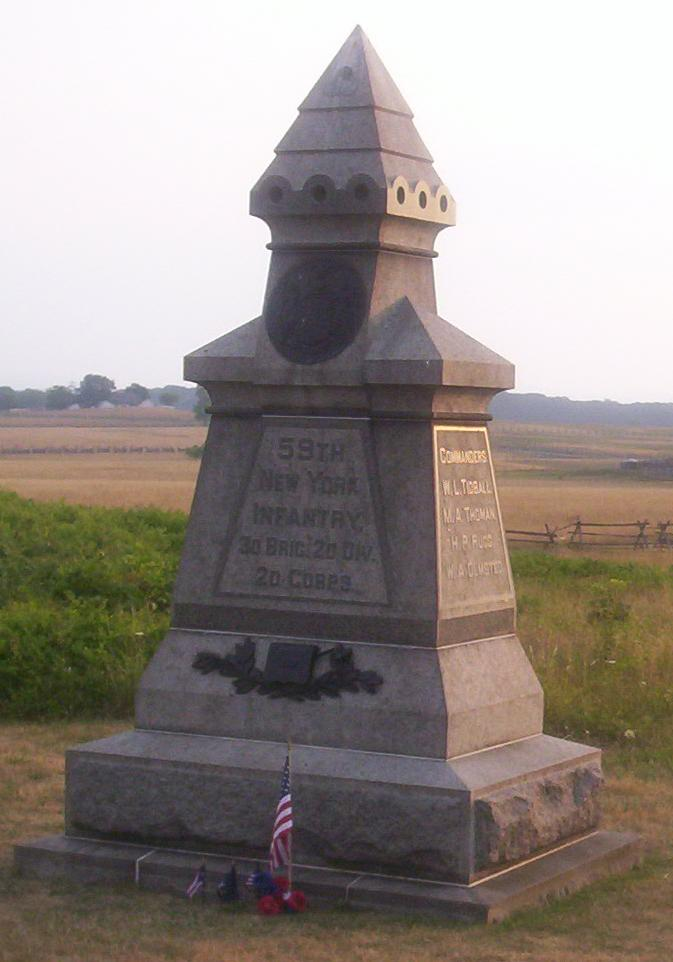
59th New York Monument at Gettysburg National Military Park

The 59th New York Infantry Regiment was a regiment in the Union Army during the American Civil War. As part of the Second Corps of the Army of the Potomac, it played a significant role in battles such as Antietam and Gettysburg.

== History ==
=== Recruitment ===
The 59th New York included recruits mainly from the streets of New York City and its environs, from upstate New York, and also a prominent group from north central Ohio. The regiment was mustered in from August 2, 1861, to October 30, 1861, and first commanded by Colonel William L. Tidball. After training in New York, the men of the 59th were assigned to the defense of Washington, D.C., and then, in July 1862, to the Second Corps of the Army of the Potomac.

=== Antietam ===
The 59th fought its first severe action at the Battle of Antietam, where it was part of the ill-fated advance of Maj. Gen. John Sedgwick’s division into the West Woods, near the Dunker Church. In the chaos of that battle, part of the regiment purportedly fired into the rear of the friendly 15th Massachusetts ahead of them. The 59th New York itself escaped the maelstrom after losing 224 men killed, wounded, and missing, including the loss of 8 officers. A monument at Antietam marks the spot where Lieutenant Colonel John L. Stetson fell mortally wounded.

=== Fredericksburg and Chancellorsville ===
The Union Guards were heavily engaged on both December 11 and December 13, 1862, at the Battle of Fredericksburg. During the Chancellorsville Campaign in early May 1863, the 59th supported Sedgwick's actions against Marye's Heights. In June, the command of the regiment changed dramatically after Colonel William Northedge resigned due to charges of corruption and drunkenness on duty. Lieutenant Colonel Max A. Thoman replaced Northedge as commander. Under Thoman's leadership, the small number of the 59th marched with the rest of Colonel Norman J. Hall's brigade of Brig. Gen. John Gibbon's division into Pennsylvania during the Gettysburg Campaign.

=== Gettysburg ===
At Gettysburg, the 59th occupied a position on the right of Hall's line on Cemetery Ridge. There it fought on July 2 against the assault of Brig. Gen. Ambrose R. Wright. Sergeant James Wiley of Company B was credited with capturing the battle flag of the 48th Georgia. (Wiley was later captured at Petersburg and died at Andersonville Prison.) Lt. Col. Thoman fell mortally wounded in the action that evening and was replaced by Captain William McFadden of Ohio. The regiment occupied the same position on July 3 against the Pickett-Pettigrew-Trimble Assault, during which was wounded its young adjutant, Lieutenant William H. Pohlman.

=== Grant's Campaign through Appomattox ===
The 59th fought with the Army of the Potomac through Grant's Overland Campaign, seeing significant action at the Wilderness, Spotsylvania, Cold Harbor, and Petersburg. Near Petersburg, on June 22, 1864, a large number of the regiment was taken prisoner. These great losses were offset by conscripts and volunteers from New York, and from men of the 82nd New York Volunteer Infantry Regiment. Redesignated as 59th New York Veteran Volunteer Infantry, it served until the end of the war at Appomattox and was mustered out under Colonel William A. Olmsted on June 30, 1865.

== Monuments ==
Two notable monuments have been erected, one at Gettysburg National Military Park in 1889 and the other at Antietam National Battlefield in 1920.

== See also ==
- 59th New York at New York State Military Museum
