= 140th Pennsylvania Infantry Regiment =

Union Army infantry regiment

140th Regiment Pennsylvania Volunteer Infantry
- Pennsylvania flag
- Active: September 8, 1862, to May 31, 1865
- Country: United States
- Allegiance: Union
- Branch: Infantry
- Size: 1,132
- Engagements: Battle of Chancellorsville; Battle of Gettysburg; Battle of Wilderness; Battle of Spotsylvania; Battle of Cold Harbor; Siege of Petersburg; Battle of Sailor's Creek

The 140th Regiment Pennsylvania Volunteer Infantry was a Union Army regiment in the American Civil War, serving in the Eastern Theater. Recruited in late 1862, it fought from the Battle of Chancellorsville through the war until the Army of Northern Virginia's surrender at Appomattox Court House. Its losses during the war were among the highest of any Union regiment.

== History ==
=== Organization ===
The regiment was recruited in Beaver, Greene, Mercer, and Washington counties, and formally mustered into service on September 8, 1862, at Camp Curtin, under the command of Col. Richard P. Roberts.

The 140th was initially placed on duty guarding the North Central Railway near Parkton, Maryland, and remained there until being ordered to join the Army of the Potomac at Aquia Creek, Virginia, where they arrived on December 12. Here they were assigned to the 3rd Brigade, 1st Division, II Army Corps, under the command of Gen. Samuel K. Zook, and proceeded to go into winter quarters near Falmouth, Virginia.

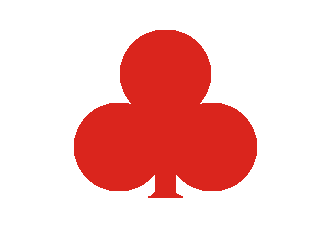
Union Army 1st Division Badge, II Corps, Army of the Potomac

While in winter camp, on January 18, 1863, the regiment received Springfield rifle muskets, to replace their large and unwieldy Vincennes muskets. These were gratefully received by the men, as they had been subjected to continuous mockery by other soldiers with quips such as, “There goes the walking artillery” or, “Look at the twelve-pounders!”

=== Chancellorsville ===
On April 28, the 140th broke camp and marched with the II Corps around Gen. Robert E. Lee's left flank, crossing the Rappahannock River at United States Ford and proceeding toward Chancellorsville, where it arrived on May 1 and took its place in the left center of Gen. Joseph Hooker's line. Receiving orders on the evening of May 2 to report to Col. Nelson Miles, in charge of the 1st Division's picket line, the men helped to beat back repeated Confederate assaults throughout the morning of May 3. Additionally, a part of the regiment assisted in bringing off the guns of Battery E, 5th Maine Light Artillery to avoid capture. With Hooker on the retreat, the 140th re-crossed the Rappahannock with the rest of Zook's brigade on May 6 and returned to their old camp near Falmouth. Thus, the regiment had had its baptism by fire.

=== Gettysburg and the remainder of 1863 ===
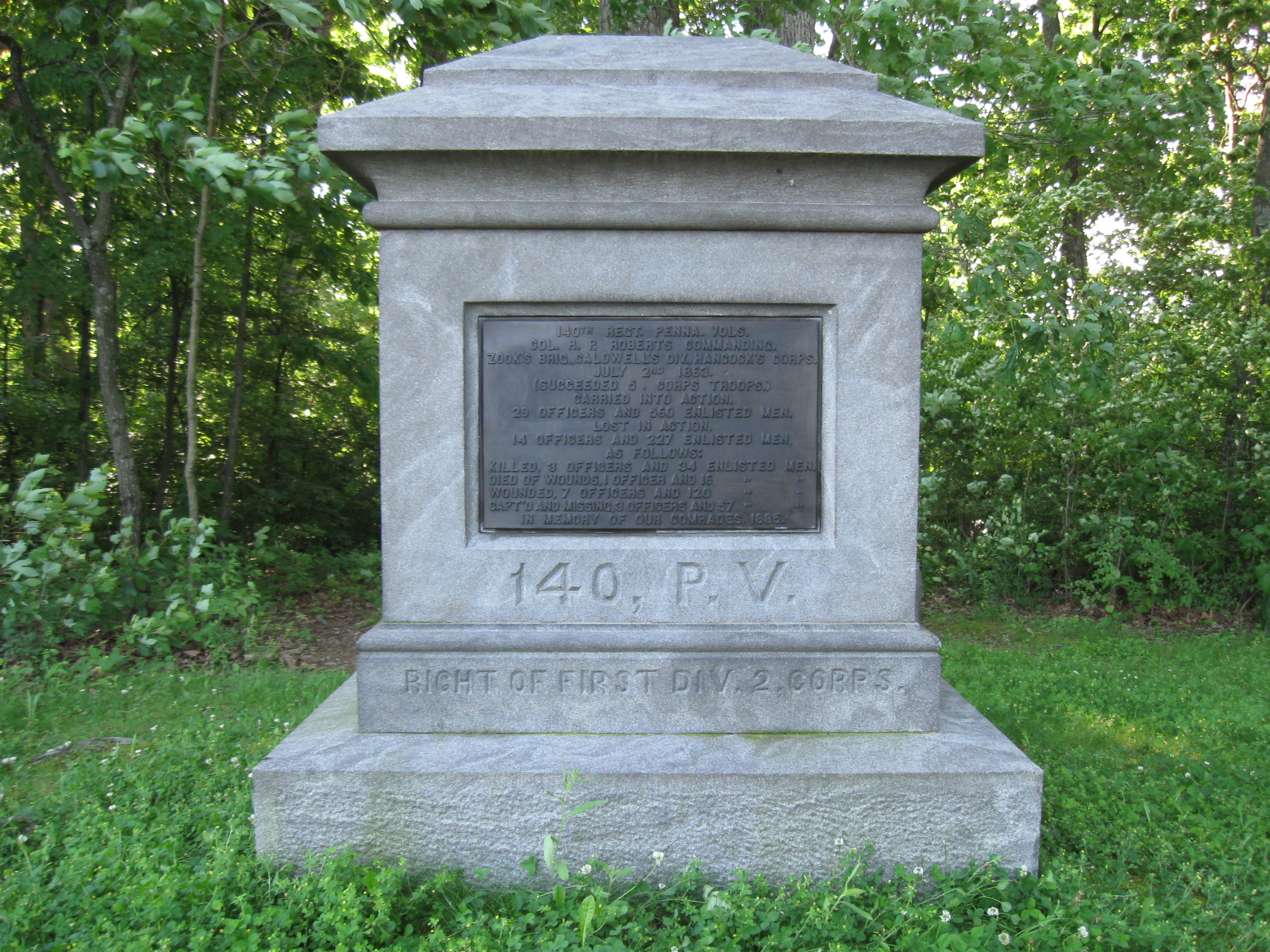
140th Pennsylvania monument between the Wheatfield and Peach Orchard at Gettysburg, erected by regimental veterans in 1885

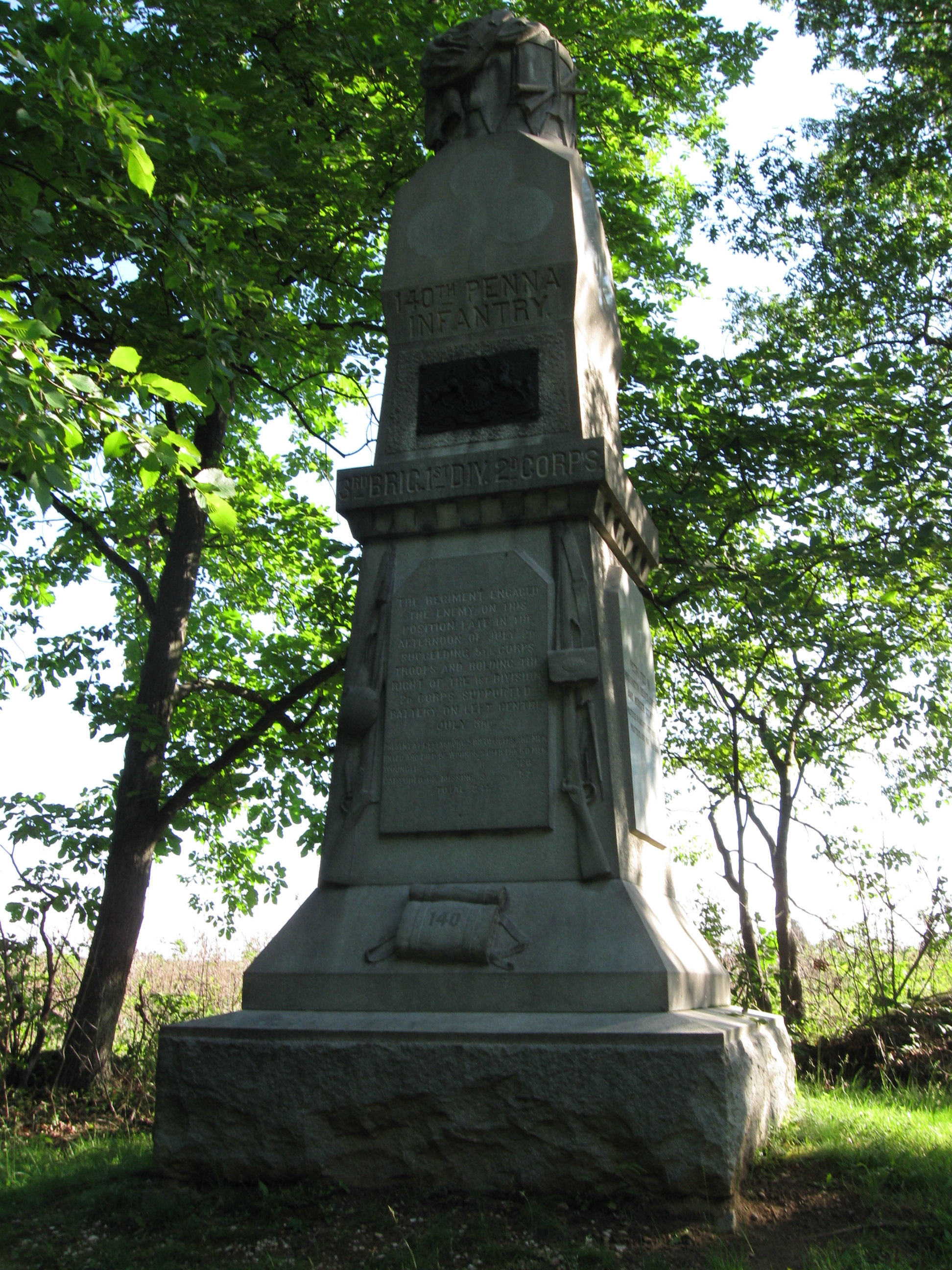
140th Pennsylvania monument erected by the state of Pennsylvania, 60 yards to the west of the original monument at Gettysburg

With Lee now on the move and having crossed into Pennsylvania, the Union Army, now under the command of Gen. George Meade, marched there to stop him. On the morning of July 2 the 140th arrived south of the town of Gettysburg, with their 1st Division taking up a position on the left of the II Corps, adjoining the right end of Gen. Daniel Sickles’ III Corps. However, Sickles arbitrarily decided to move his troops out in front of the rest of the Union line, and was soon in trouble, being attacked by Confederates in the afternoon. Thus Gen. Winfield Scott Hancock dispatched the 1st Division to report to Gen. George Sykes to be placed in line of battle to assist Sickles, moving to the latter's left end. The 3rd Brigade, under Gen. Zook, who was mortally wounded, advanced on the right end of the division across The Wheatfield, with the 140th occupying the right flank of the brigade. They initially made progress in pushing back the Rebels, but with the onset of Confederate reinforcements and the subsequent collapse of the III Corps to their right, as well as the withdrawal of the division on the left, the brigade was compelled to retreat. Together with their brigade, the regiment occupied a position on the left center of the Union line for the remainder of the battle.

At Gettysburg the 140th carried into action 29 officers and 560 enlisted men. 14 officers and 227 enlisted men were lost in action, as follows: Killed, 3 officers and 34 enlisted men. Died of wounds, 1 officer and 16 enlisted men. Wounded, 7 officers and 120 enlisted men. Captured and missing, 3 officers and 57 enlisted men. Command of the regiment now devolved to Lt. Col John Fraser, who would be promoted to colonel dating from July 4, 1863.

With Lee defeated at Gettysburg, the Union Army pursued him as he retreated into Virginia. In September, the 1st Division was reorganized and the 140th was now assigned to the 1st Brigade, under the command of Col. Nelson Miles. For the remainder of 1863, the regiment was involved in a series of advances and retrograde movements in Northern Virginia with the II Corps, including limited involvement at the Battle of Bristoe Station on October 14, before finally settling into winter encampment.

=== 1864 ===
On May 3, 1864, the 140th broke camp and began their part in what would be known as Overland Campaign, under the command of Gen. Ulysses S. Grant. During the Battle of the Wilderness, the 1st Brigade occupied the extreme left flank of the Union line.

For the first part of the Battle of Spotsylvania, the 1st Brigade occupied the extreme right of the Union line. After being detached for a brief reconnaissance to Todd's Tavern, the 140th rejoined the brigade in its slide to the east, closer to the left end of the Union line. There, early on the morning of May 12 they took part in the massive assault on the part of the Confederate line known as the “Mule Shoe.” The men had to pick their way through trees felled to form an abatis before making their way up to the Mule Shoe, where they managed to dislodge the Rebels from their first line, but were unable to proceed further, having to settle into the works just captured. On May 15 the 1st Division was ordered to the rear and occupied this position until the 21st, when they joined Grant's next flank movement to the east toward North Anna River. The movement to and actions at Spotsylvania cost the regiment 41 men killed, 125 officers and men wounded, and 10 men missing, for a total of 176.

The regiment next moved with the II Corps toward the North Anna River, and was involved in skirmishing there May 23–25 at the Battle of North Anna. Grant finding that Lee's forces were too strongly entrenched there for a major assault, he ordered yet another eastward movement, this time in the direction of Cold Harbor. At the Battle of Cold Harbor the 1st Brigade occupied the left of the Union line, making contact with the Confederates on June 2, and driving their line back for a period before being counterattacked in turn and forced to give ground themselves. On June 3, the regiment was held in support of pickets on the left while the rest of the Union assault occurred to the north. Having advanced their position and entrenching on June 6, they remained in this position until the 12th. Their losses in the movement to Cold Harbor and the subsequent battle there were 10 officers and men killed, 24 men wounded, and 10 men missing.

==== Petersburg ====
Grant again uprooted his army, and the II Corps now crossed the James River and advanced on Petersburg. On June 16 the 1st Division joined in an attack on the Confederate entrenchments outside the city, but this would prove to be the beginning of a long siege that would last until April 2, 1865. During this period, the 140th was involved in various movements and smaller battles which comprised the overall siege, including Ream's Station on August 25, and Hatcher's Run February 5–7, 1865.

=== End of the War in Eastern Theater ===
With the Union Army's breakthrough of the Confederate line on April 2, the 140th now joined in the final pursuit of the remnants of Lee's troops, which would include the Battle of Sayler's Creek and their final battle at Farmville on April 7. Lee would finally surrender to Grant on April 9, thus bringing the war to a close in this theater.

The regiment took its place in the Grand Review of the Armies in Washington, D.C., and was then formally mustered out of service on May 31.

== Notable members ==
- Henry H. Bingham, U.S. Congressman, recipient of the Medal of Honor following his service during the Battle of the Wilderness
- James Pipes, recipient of the Medal of Honor following his service during the Battle of Gettysburg.
- James J. Purman, recipient of the Medal of Honor following his service during the Battle of Gettysburg.

== Losses ==
Over the course of the war, the 140th Pennsylvania had 1132 officers and men enrolled in its ranks. Of these, 198 were killed or mortally wounded, or 17.4 percent, among the highest rates of any Union regiment in the Civil War. An additional 128 died of disease, for a total of 326, or 28.8%.

== Re-enactors ==
Currently there is a reenactment group, the 140th Pennsylvania Volunteer Infantry, Co. A, based in Greene County, Pennsylvania.

There is also a reenactment group, the 140th Pennsylvania Volunteer Infantry, Co. C, a member unit of the Nevada Civil War Volunteers based in Dayton, Nevada.

== See also ==
- List of Pennsylvania Civil War Units
