= James Richmond (Medal of Honor) =

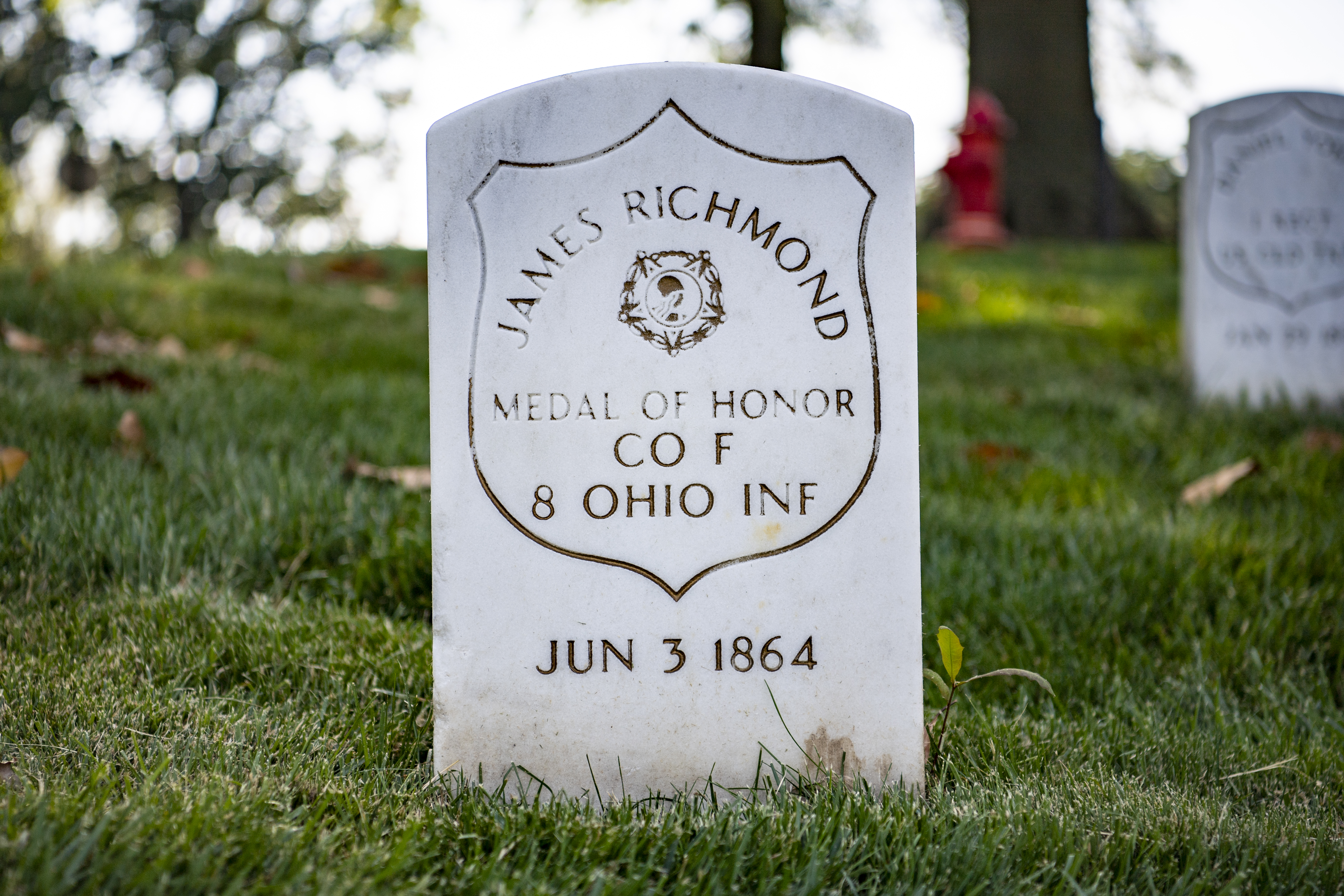
- Grave at Arlington National Cemetery
- Born: c. 1843; Maine, US
- Died: June 3, 1864 (aged 20–21); Washington, D.C., U.S.
- Burial place: Arlington National Cemetery
- Military career
- Allegiance: United States
- Branch: United States Army
- Service years: to 1864
- Rank: Private
- Units: Company F, 8th Ohio Infantry
- Conflicts: American Civil War • Battle of Gettysburg • Battle of Spotsylvania Court House
- Awards: Medal of Honor

James Richmond (c. 1843 – June 3, 1864) was a Union Army soldier in the American Civil War and a recipient of the U.S. military's highest decoration, the Medal of Honor, for his actions at the Battle of Gettysburg.

Born in 1843 in Maine, Richmond was living in Toledo, Ohio, when he joined the Army. He served during the war as a private in Company F of the 8th Ohio Infantry. On July 3, 1863, during the Battle of Gettysburg, he captured a Confederate battle flag.

He was wounded at the Battle of Spotsylvania Court House the next year, on May 12, 1864, and died of his injuries weeks later, on June 3. He is buried at Arlington National Cemetery.

For his actions at Gettysburg, Richmond was posthumously awarded the Medal of Honor on December 1, 1864. His official citation reads simply: "Capture of flag."

== See also ==
- List of Medal of Honor recipients for the Battle of Gettysburg
- List of American Civil War Medal of Honor recipients: Q–S
