= John Barclay Fassett =

American soldier

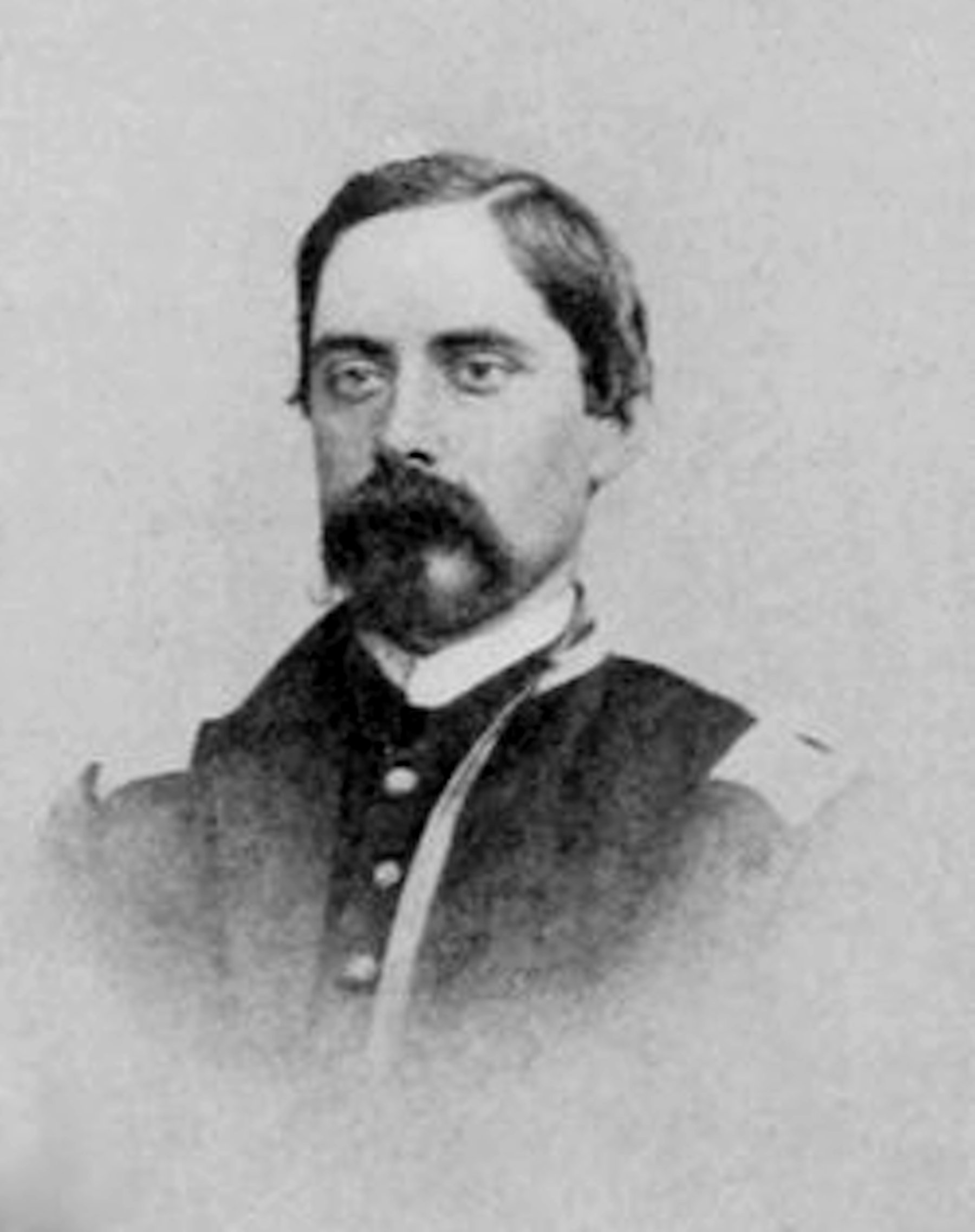
- John Barclay Fassett c. 1864
- Born: c. 1843; Philadelphia, Pennsylvania
- Died: January 18, 1905; The Bronx, New York
- Burial place: Woodlawn Cemetery, The Bronx, New York
- Military career
- Allegiance: United States of America
- Branch: United States Army
- Rank: Captain
- Units: Company F, 23rd Pennsylvania Infantry
- Conflicts: Battle of Gettysburg
- Awards: Medal of Honor

Captain John Barclay Fassett (c. 1843 to January 18, 1905) was an American soldier who fought in the American Civil War. Fassett received the country's highest award for bravery during combat, the Medal of Honor, for his action during the Battle of Gettysburg in Pennsylvania on 2 July 1863. He was honored with the award on 29 December 1894.

== Biography ==
Fassett was born in Philadelphia, Pennsylvania in about 1843. He enlisted into the 23rd Pennsylvania Infantry. He died on 18 January 1905 and his remains are interred at Woodlawn Cemetery in the Bronx, New York City.

== Medal of Honor citation ==
The President of the United States of America, in the name of Congress, takes pleasure in presenting the Medal of Honor to Captain John Barclay Fassett, United States Army, for extraordinary heroism on 2 July 1863, while serving with Company F, 23rd Pennsylvania Infantry, in action at Gettysburg, Pennsylvania. While acting as an aide, Captain Fassett voluntarily led a regiment to the relief of a battery and recaptured its guns from the enemy.

== See also ==
- List of Medal of Honor recipients for the Battle of Gettysburg
- List of American Civil War Medal of Honor recipients: A–F
