= 126th New York Infantry Regiment =

- Active: August 22, 1862, to June 3, 1865
- Country: United States
- Allegiance: Union
- Branch: Infantry
- Engagements: Battle of Harpers Ferry; Battle of Gettysburg; Bristoe Campaign; Mine Run Campaign; Battle of the Wilderness; Battle of Spotsylvania Court House; Battle of Cold Harbor; Siege of Petersburg; Second Battle of Petersburg; Battle of Jerusalem Plank Road; First Battle of Deep Bottom; Second Battle of Deep Bottom; Second Battle of Ream's Station; Battle of Fort Stedman; Appomattox Campaign; Battle of White Oak Road; Battle of Sutherland's Station; Battle of Sailor's Creek; Battle of High Bridge; Battle of Appomattox Court House

Commanders
- Colonel: Eliakim Sherrill
- Colonel: Ira Smith Brown
- Lieutenant Colonel: James M. Bull

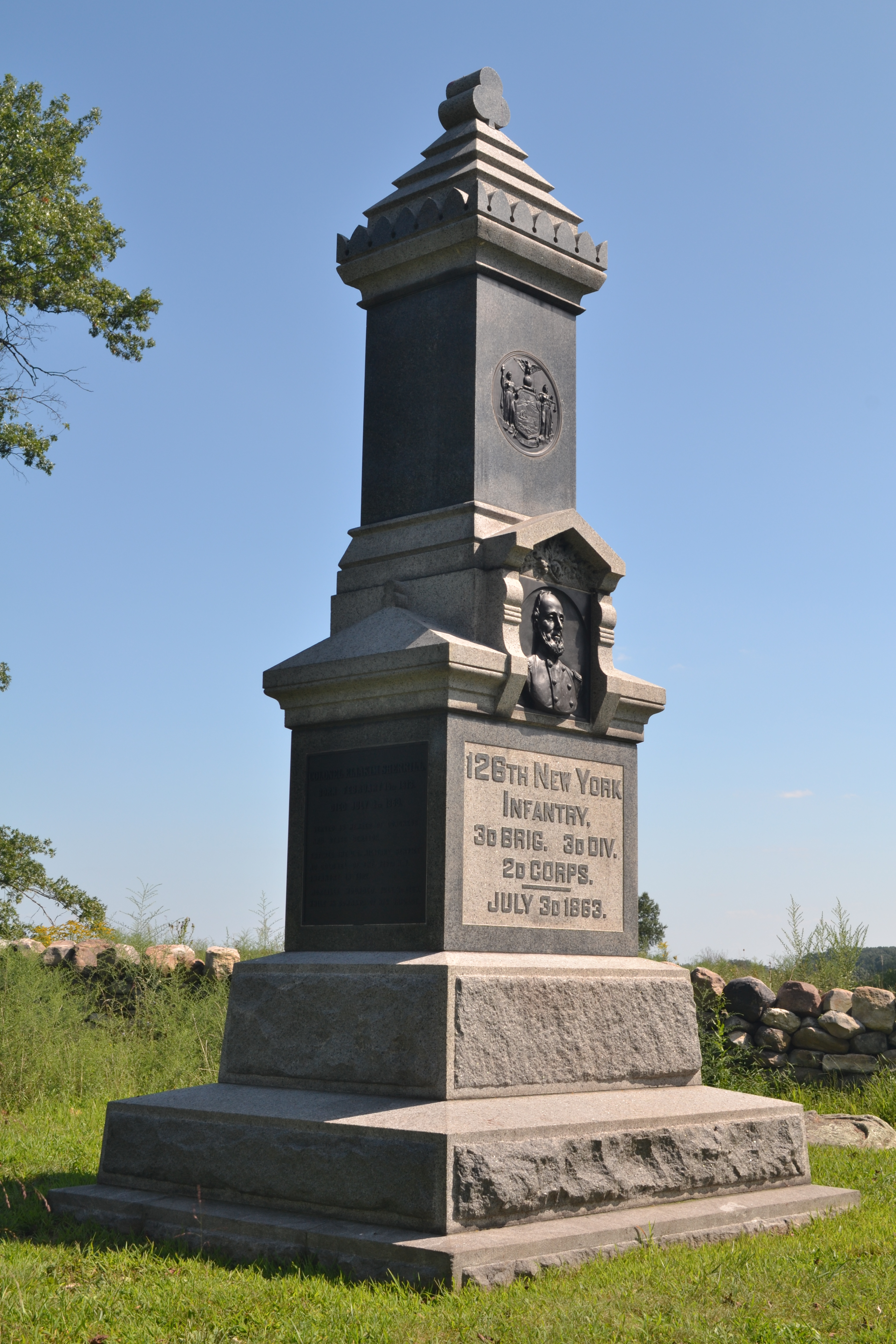
126th New York Infantry Monument at Gettysburg

The 126th New York Infantry Regiment was an infantry regiment in the Union Army during the American Civil War.

== Service ==
The 126th New York Infantry was organized at Geneva, New York, and mustered in for three years service on August 22, 1862, under the command of Colonel Eliakim Sherrill.

The regiment was attached to Miles' Command, Harpers Ferry, Virginia, September 1862. Camp Douglas, Chicago, Illinois, to December 1862. 3rd Brigade, Casey's Division, Defenses of Washington, D.C., to February 1863. 3rd Brigade, Casey's Division, XXII Corps, to April 1863. 3rd Brigade, Abercrombie's Division, XXII Corps, to June 1863. 3rd Brigade, 3rd Division, II Corps, Army of the Potomac, to March 1864. 3rd Brigade, 1st Division, II Corps, to June 1864. Consolidated Brigade, 1st Division, II Corps, to November 1864. 3rd Brigade, 1st Division, II Corps, to June 1865.

The 126th New York Infantry mustered out of service June 3, 1865. Recruits and veterans were transferred to the 4th New York Heavy Artillery.

== Detailed service ==
The regiment left New York for Baltimore, Maryland, then moved to Martinsburg, Virginia on September 2, 1862. Retreat to Harper's Ferry, September 11–12. Defense of Harpers Ferry, September 12–15, 1862. Maryland Heights September 12–13. Bolivar Heights September 14–15. Regiment surrendered September 15. Paroled September 16 and sent to Annapolis, Maryland, then to Camp Douglas, Chicago, Illinois, and duty there guarding prisoners until November. Declared exchanged November 22, 1862. Moved to Washington, D.C., November 23–25. Camp at Arlington Heights, Virginia, defenses of Washington, to December 3, 1862, and at Centreville, Virginia, until June 1863. Ordered to join Army of the Potomac in the field and joined II Corps June 25. Gettysburg Campaign June 25-July 24. Battle of Gettysburg July 1–3. Pursuit of Lee to Manassas Gap, Va., July 5–24. Duty on line of the Rappahannock and Rapidan until October. Advance from the Rappahannock to the Rapidan September 13–17. Bristoe Campaign October 9–22. Auburn and Bristoe October 14. Advance to line of the Rappahannock November 7–8. Brandy Station November 8. Mine Run Campaign November 26-December 2. Duty near Brandy Station, Virginia, until May 1864. Demonstration on the Rapidan February 6–7. Morton's Ford February 6–7. Campaign from the Rapidan to the James May 3-June 15. Battles of the Wilderness May 5–7; Spotsylvania May 8–12; Po River May 10; Spottsylvania Court House May 12–21. Assault on the Salient, "Bloody Angle," May 12. North Anna River May 23–26. On line of the Pamunkey May 26–28. Totopotomoy May 28–31. Cold Harbor June 1–12. Before Petersburg June 16–18. Siege of Petersburg June 16, 1864, to April 2, 1865. Jerusalem Plank Road, Weldon Railroad, June 22–23, 1864. Demonstration north of James River July 27–29. Deep Bottom July 27–28. Demonstration north of James River August 13–20. Strawberry Plains, Deep Bottom, August 14–18. Ream's Station August 25. Reconnaissance to Hatcher's Run December 9–10. Dabney's Mills February 5–7, 1865. Watkins' House March 25. Appomattox Campaign March 28-April 9. On line of Hatcher's and Gravelly Runs March 29–30. White Oak Road March 31. Sutherland Station and fall of Petersburg April 2. Pursuit of Lee April 3–9. Deatonville Road, Sailor's Creek, April 6. High Bridge and Farmville April 7. Appomattox Court House April 9. Surrender of Lee and his army. At Burkesville until May 2. Moved to Washington, D.C., May 2–12. Grand Review of the Armies May 23.

== Casualties ==
The regiment lost a total of 276 men during service; 16 officers and 137 enlisted men killed or mortally wounded, 1 officer and 122 enlisted men died of disease.

== Commanders ==
- Colonel Eliakim Sherrill - commanded the regiment at the Battle of Gettysburg until July 2 when he assumed command of a brigade; mortally wounded in action on July 3
- Colonel Ira Smith Brown
- Lieutenant Colonel James M. Bull - commanded the regiment at the Battle of Gettysburg, July 2–3
- Captain Winfield Scott - commanded at the Battle of the Wilderness
- Captain John B. Geddis - commanded at the First Battle of Deep Bottom

== Notable members ==
- Captain Morris Brown Jr., Company A - Medal of Honor recipient for action at the Battle of Gettysburg
- Sergeant George H. Dore, Company D - Medal of Honor recipient for action at the Battle of Gettysburg
- Private Jerry Wall, Company B - Medal of Honor recipient for action at the Battle of Gettysburg

== See also ==
- List of New York Civil War regiments
- New York in the Civil War
