= John G. Miller (Medal of Honor) =

American soldier

- Born: August 1841; Kingdom of Bavaria
- Died: June 11, 1909 (aged 67); Champaign, Illinois, US
- Burial place: Saint Marys Cemetery, Champaign, Illinois
- Military career
- Allegiance: United States of America
- Branch: United States Army
- Rank: Sergeant
- Units: Company G, 8th Ohio Infantry
- Conflicts: Battle of Gettysburg; American Civil War
- Awards: Medal of Honor

John G. Miller (August 1841 – June 11, 1909) was an American soldier who fought with the Union Army in the American Civil War. Miller received his country's highest award for bravery during combat, the Medal of Honor, for actions taken on July 3, 1863 during the Battle of Gettysburg.

== Civil War service ==
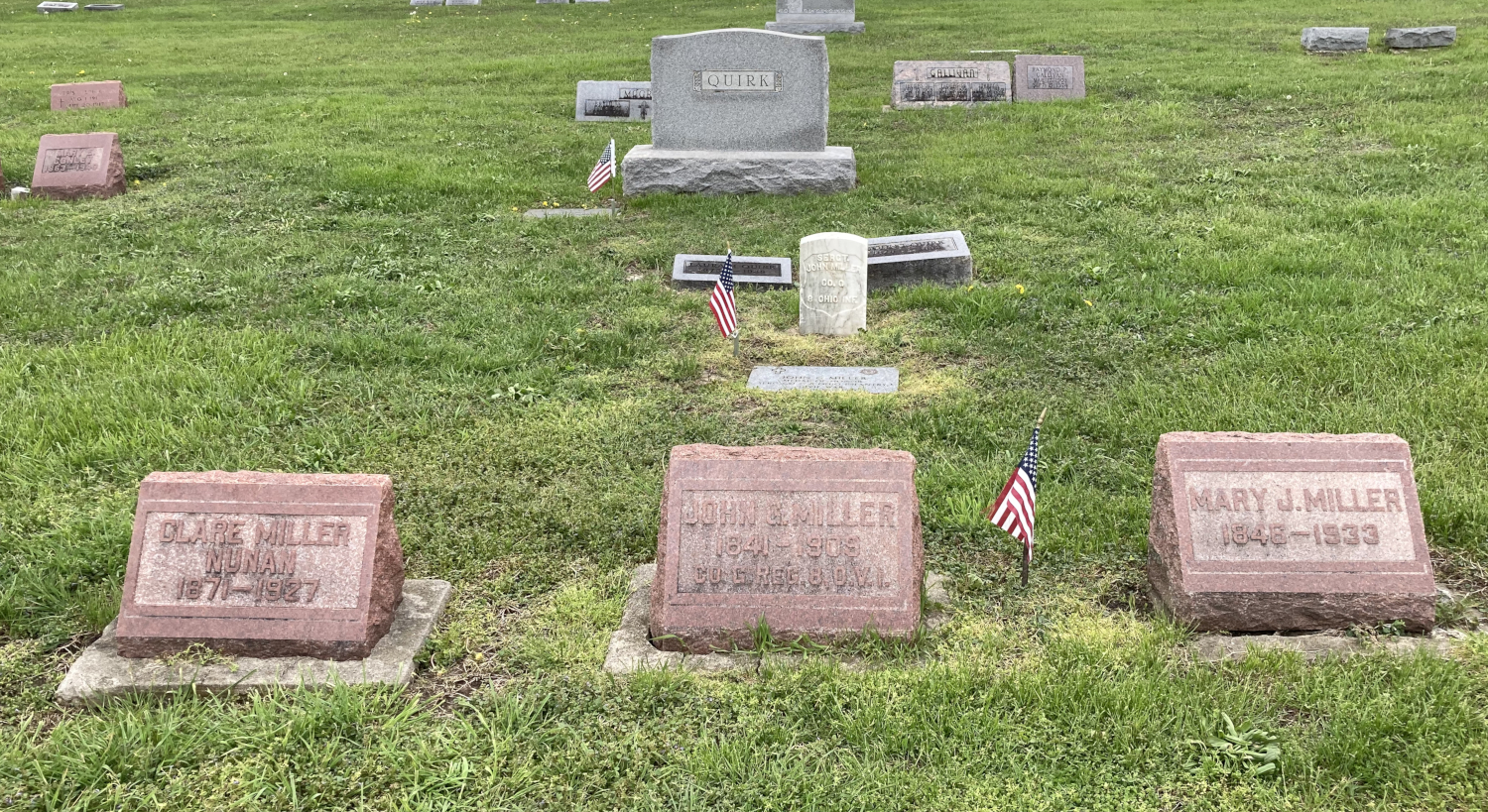
Miller's grave at Saint Mary Cemetery, Champaign, Illinois

Born in Germany, Miller grew up in Fremont, Ohio, and at the age of 18 was enlisted into the 8th Ohio Infantry out of Camp Dennison. At the First Battle of Kernstown, Miller was promoted to corporal.

Miller fought in the Battle of Gettysburg from July 1–3, 1863. On the third day, Miller's company fought at The Angle against the 34th North Carolina Infantry Regiment and the 38th Virginia Infantry. During the attack Miller sprang forward, killed the color guard of the 34th North Carolina, and took his flag. When Miller's unit had regrouped, Pickett's Charge had begun, and he was able to help corral the color bearer of the 38th Virginia, taking his flag as well.

== Medal of Honor citation ==
The President of the United States of America, in the name of Congress, takes pleasure in presenting the Medal of Honor to Corporal John G. Miller, United States Army, for extraordinary heroism on 3 July 1863, while serving with Company G, 8th Ohio Infantry, in action at Gettysburg, Pennsylvania, for capture of two flags.
