= William B. Hincks =

Union army soldier

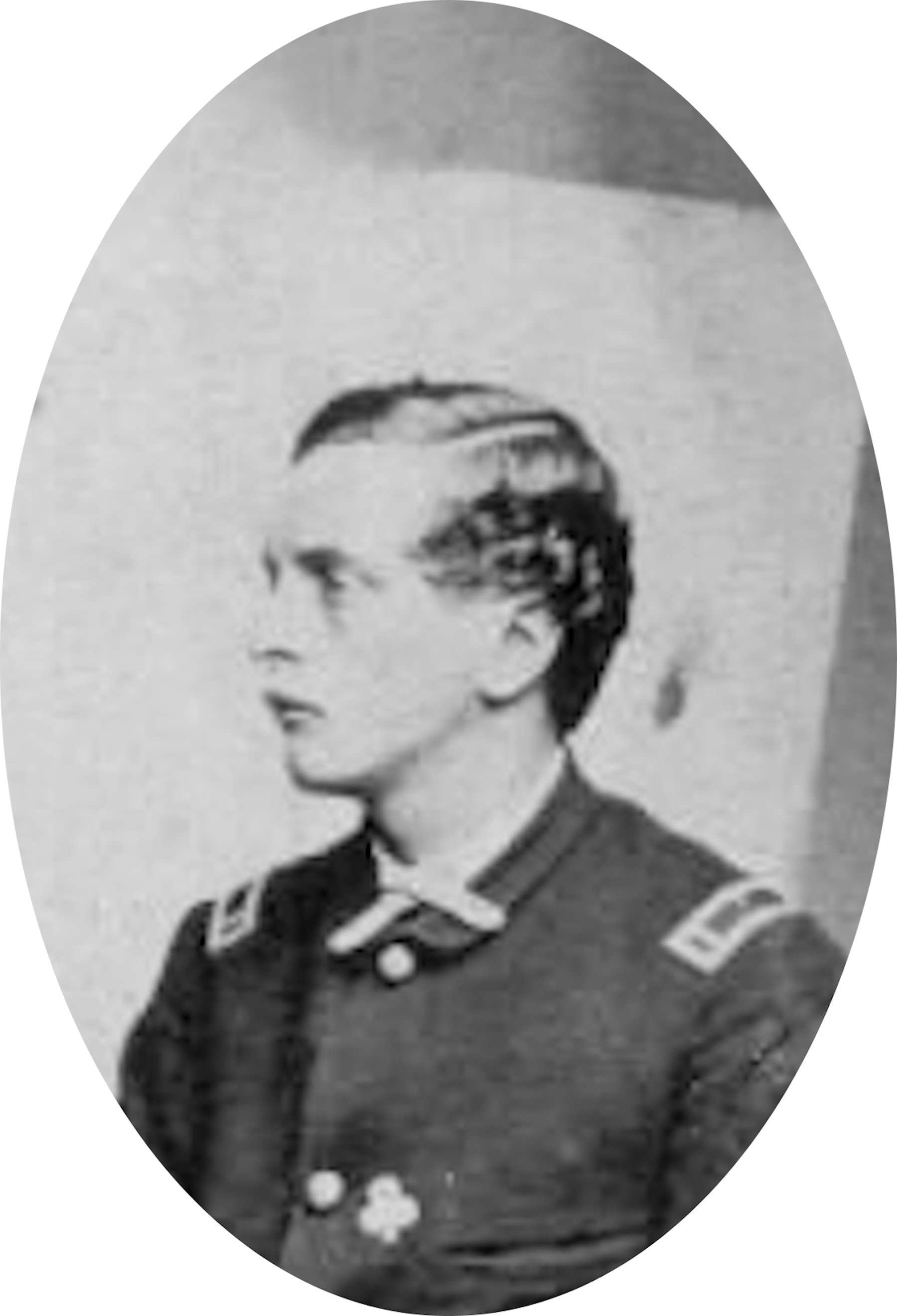
- Hincks c. 1865
- Born: 1841; Bucksport, Maine, U.S.
- Died: 1903 (aged 61–62)
- Burial place: Bridgeport, Connecticut, U.S.
- Military career
- Allegiance: United States
- Branch: Union Army
- Service years: 1862–1865
- Rank: Major
- Unit: 14th Connecticut Infantry Regiment
- Conflicts: American Civil War: Battle of Gettysburg
- Awards: Medal of Honor

William Bliss Hincks (1841–1903) was a Union Army soldier in the American Civil War who received the U.S. military's highest decoration, the Medal of Honor.

== Early life ==
Hincks was born in 1841 in Bucksport, Maine. He moved to Bridgeport, Connecticut, as a boy. Described as a young man of scholastic aptitude and inclination, Hincks put his education on hold to enlist in the Civil War.

== Civil War military service ==
In his regiment, he was said to be a man with strength of mind and purity of purpose, integrity of character, and frankness of manner who could not fail to influence his comrades and win their love and esteem.

Hincks enlisted as a private and rose quickly through the ranks of the regiment. On August 20, 1862, he mustered into "A" Co., Connecticut 14th Infantry as a private, promoted Sergeant in February 1863, Sergeant Major in June 1863, Adjutant in October 1863 and Major in April 1865. With the exception of a short tour on the brigade staff, Hincks was with the 14th through all its engagements. He was mustered out with his regiment on May 31, 1865, having been in service from Antietam to Appomattox with the 14th Connecticut Regiment.

== Medal of Honor ==
Hincks was awarded the Medal of Honor for extraordinary heroism on July 3, 1863, while serving as a sergeant major with the 14th Connecticut Infantry Regiment, at the Battle of Gettysburg. His Medal of Honor was issued on December 1, 1864.

Citation:

The President of the United States of America, in the name of Congress, takes pleasure in presenting the Medal of Honor to Sergeant Major William B. Hincks, United States Army, for extraordinary heroism on 3 July 1863, while serving with 14th Connecticut Infantry, in action at Gettysburg, Pennsylvania. During the high-water mark of Pickett's charge on 3 July 1863 the colors of the 14th Tennessee Infantry C.S.A. were planted 50 yards in front of the center of Sergeant Major Hincks' regiment. There were no Confederates standing near it but several were lying down around it. Upon a call for volunteers by Major Ellis, commanding, to capture this flag, this soldier and two others leaped the wall. One companion was instantly shot. Sergeant Major Hincks outran his remaining companion running straight and swift for the colors amid a storm of shot. Swinging his saber over the prostrate Confederates and uttering a terrific yell, he seized the flag and hastily returned to his lines. The 14th Tennessee carried 12 battle honors on its flag. The devotion to duty shown by Sergeant Major Hincks gave encouragement to many of his comrades at a crucial moment of the battle.

== Post war ==
At the end of the war, Major Hincks returned to Bridgeport and became engaged in the mercantile business. He became known for careful and sound judgement and gained him a solid reputation as business advisor. He became custodian for many business trusts. As his business career continued to bloom, he also became vice-president and secretary of many business organizations in Bridgeport. For many years he was treasurer and secretary of the City Saving's Bank of Bridgeport. Hincks helped P.T. Barnum found the Barnum Museum and Bridgeport Hospital. He also wrote about local history.

He married Mary Louise Hart in 1866, and they had three sons. They lived in a house on Park Avenue and Prospect Streets that has since been demolished. He was a deacon in his church and involved in many community activities.

He died at the age of 62, on November 7, 1903, and was buried at the Mountain Grove Cemetery and Mausoleum in Bridgeport, Connecticut.

His son, William Thurston Hincks, was a lawyer who married Maud Morris, who was the vice president of the suffragist movement in Connecticut, and also the first woman in Connecticut to get a driver's license.

== See also ==
- List of Medal of Honor recipients
- List of American Civil War Medal of Honor recipients: G–L
