= 26th Pennsylvania Infantry Regiment =

Union Army infantry regiment

26th Pennsylvania Volunteer Infantry
- Active: April 20, 1861 – June 18, 1864
- Country: United States
- Allegiance: Union
- Branch: United States Army; Union Army
- Type: Infantry
- Engagements: Siege of Yorktown; Battle of Williamsburg; Battle of Seven Pines; Seven Days Battles; Battle of Oak Grove; Battle of Savage's Station; Battle of White Oak Swamp; Battle of Malvern Hill; Second Battle of Bull Run; Battle of Fredericksburg; Battle of Chancellorsville; Battle of Gettysburg; Bristoe Campaign; Mine Run Campaign; Battle of the Wilderness; Battle of Spotsylvania Court House; Battle of Harris Farm

The 26th Pennsylvania Volunteer Infantry was an infantry regiment that served in the Union Army during the American Civil War.

== Service ==
The 26th Pennsylvania Infantry was organized in Philadelphia, Pennsylvania on April 20, 1861 and mustered on May 27, 1861 for a three-year enlistment under the command of Colonel William F. Small.

The regiment was attached to Defenses of Washington, D.C. to August 1861. Hooker's Brigade, Division of the Potomac, to October 1861. Grover's Brigade, Hooker's Division, Army of the Potomac, to March 1862. 1st Brigade, 2nd Division, III Corps, Army of the Potomac, to March 1864. 1st Brigade, 4th Division, II Corps, to June 1864.

The 26th Pennsylvania Infantry mustered out June 18, 1864. Veterans and recruits were transferred to the 99th Pennsylvania Infantry.

== Detailed service ==
Moved to Washington, D.C., June 15, 1861. Duty in the defenses of Washington, D. C., until October 1861, and at Budd's Ferry, Md., October 20, 1861 to April 1, 1862. Moved to the Virginia Peninsula, Siege of Yorktown, April 5-May 4. Battle of Williamsburg May 5. Battle of Seven Pines, May 31-June 1. Seven days before Richmond June 25-July 1. Oak Grove June 25. Savage's Station June 29. White Oak Swamp and Glendale June 30. Malvern Hill July 1. Duty at Harrison's Landing until August 16. Action at Malvern Hill August 5. Movement to Centreville August 16–26. Pope's Campaign in northern Virginia August 26-September 2. Bristoe Station, Kettle Run, August 27. Battle of Groveton August 29. Second Battle of Bull Run August 30. Battle of Chantilly September 1. Duty in the defenses of Washington, D.C., until November. Operations on Orange & Alexandria Railroad October 10–12. Movement to Falmouth, Va., November 18–28. Battle of Fredericksburg. Va., December 12–15. "Mud March" January 20–24, 1863. Operations at Rappahannock Bridge and Grove Church February 5–7. At Falmouth until April. Chancellorsville Campaign April 27-May 6. Battle of Chancellorsville May 1–5. Gettysburg Campaign June 11-July 24. Battle of Gettysburg July 1–3. Whapping Heights, Va., July 23. Duty on line of the Rapidan River until October. Bristoe Campaign October 9–22. Advance to line of the Rappahannock November 7–8. Kelly's Ford November 7. Mine Run Campaign November 26-December 2. Payne's Farm November 27. Demonstration on the Rapidan February 6–7, 1864. Near Brandy Station until May. Rapidan Campaign May 4–28. Battle of the Wilderness May 5–7. Spotsylvania May 8–12. Spotsylvania Court House May 12–21. Assault on the Salient May 12. Harris Farm, on Fredericksburg Road, May 19. North Anna River May 23–26. Ox Ford May 24. Line of the Pamunkey May 26–28. Left the front May 28.

== Casualties ==
The regiment lost a total of 222 men during service; 6 officers and 143 enlisted men killed or mortally wounded, 2 officers and 71 enlisted men died of disease.

== Commanders ==
- Colonel William F. Small- wounded in action at the Battle of Williamsburg; discharged June 30, 1862
- Colonel Benjamin C. Tilghman - wounded in action at the Battle of Chancellorsville; discharged July 26, 1863 to accept command of the 3rd U.S. Colored Infantry
- Lieutenant Colonel Robert Lewis Bodine

== Notable members ==
- Private Thomas Valentine Cooper, Company C - Pennsylvania State Senator and Representative
- 1st Sergeant George W. Roosevelt, Company K - Medal of Honor recipient for actions at the Second Battle of Bull Run and the Battle of Gettysburg
- Captain Daniel W. Broadbent, Company B - Pennsylvania State Senator and Patent Attorney; argued O'Reilly v. Morse in the Supreme Court

== See also ==
- List of Pennsylvania Civil War Units
- Pennsylvania in the Civil War
