= James J. Purman =

American Civil War soldier who won the Medal of Honor

James Jackson Purman
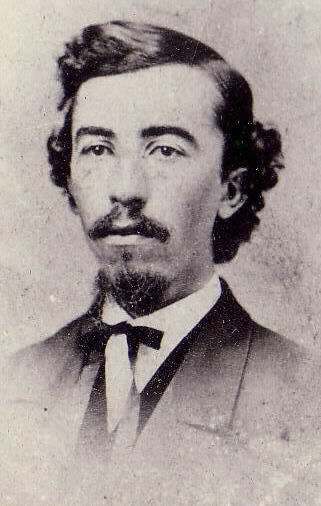
- Born: March 21, 1841; Greene County, Pennsylvania, US
- Died: May 10, 1915 (aged 74); Washington, D.C., US
- Burial place: Arlington National Cemetery
- Military career
- Allegiance: United States of America
- Branch: United States Army
- Rank: First Lieutenant
- Unit: Company A 140th Pennsylvania Infantry
- Conflicts: Battle of Gettysburg; American Civil War
- Awards: Medal of Honor

James J. Purman (March 21, 1841 – May 10, 1915) was an American soldier who fought with the Union Army in the American Civil War. Purman received his country's highest award for bravery during combat, the Medal of Honor, for actions taken on July 2, 1863, during the Battle of Gettysburg.

== Early years ==
Purman was born in 1841 near Waynesburg, Pennsylvania to a farming family. He began a job typesetting at the local newspaper and attended Waynesburg College while simultaneously teaching at a local school.

== Civil War service ==
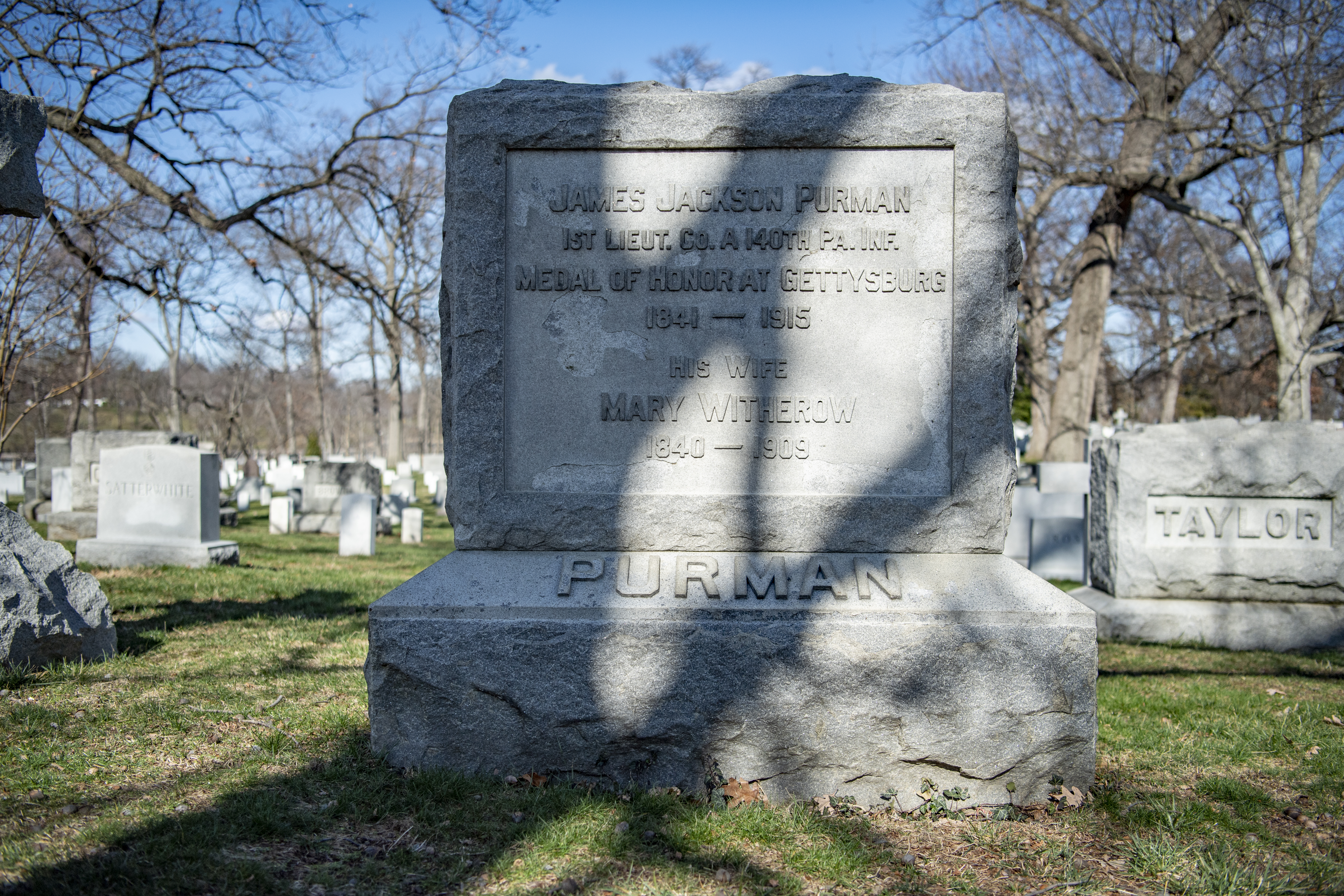
Grave at Arlington National Cemetery

Due to a series of Union defeats in 1862, Purman decided to drop out of school to organize a volunteer Army unit. Purman, along with four other men, started a volunteer cavalry corps out of Greene County, Pennsylvania. The first volunteer to enlist was James Pipes, who would go on to serve with Purman and later earn the Medal of Honor himself for their shared actions.

When the Union Army stopped accepting volunteer cavalry units, Purman's company changed their name to the Greene County Rifles. They were mustered into the army under the 140th Pennsylvania Infantry, and soon thereafter were drawn into the action at the Battle of Gettysburg. On the first day of battle, July 1, Purman and Pipes were retreating under fire when they heard a fallen soldier calling for help and circled back to retrieve him. As they deposited the soldier on safe ground, both Purman and Pipes were shot. Purman was hit in the lower leg and spent the night wounded in the field. When the fighting resumed the next morning, Purman was shot in the other leg. He crawled to a nearby copse of trees where he begged a Confederate soldier for water. The enemy soldier helped Purman to a nearby tree and left him food and water. Purman was soon rescued by stretcher-bearers and brought to a field hospital where his left leg was amputated.

Purman was discharged from the Army in May 1864 due to disability.

== Medal of Honor citation ==
The President of the United States of America, in the name of Congress, takes pleasure in presenting the Medal of Honor to Lieutenant James Jackson Purman, United States Army, for extraordinary heroism on 2 July 1863, while serving with Company A, 140th Pennsylvania Infantry, in action at Gettysburg, Pennsylvania. Lieutenant Purman voluntarily assisted a wounded comrade to a place of apparent safety while the enemy were in close proximity; he received the fire of the enemy and a wound which resulted in the amputation of his left leg.

== Personal life ==
Following the war, Purman finished his degree at Waynesburg College and went on to marry Mary Witherow, one of the daughters of the family he lived with during his recuperation. Together they had two children. He became a principal of a Baptist school and later opened a law practice in Greene County.

Purman moved to Washington, D.C., to pursue medicine, and in 1881 took yet another job at the U.S. Patent Office. In 1907, Purman invited the Confederate soldier who saved him during the Battle of Gettysburg, Thomas Oliver, to Washington to meet President Theodore Roosevelt.

Purman died on May 11, 1915, and was buried in Arlington National Cemetery.
