= James Pipes =

James Milton Pipes
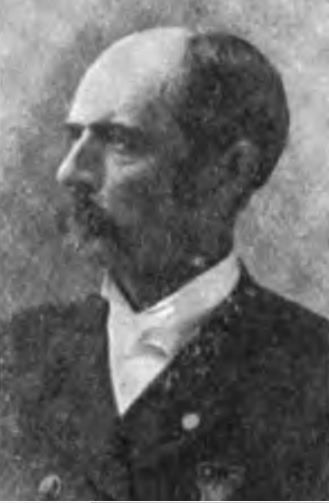
- Born: November 10, 1840; Morrisville, Pennsylvania, US
- Died: December 1, 1928 (aged 88); Washington, D.C., US
- Burial place: Arlington National Cemetery
- Military career
- Allegiance: United States of America
- Branch: United States Army
- Rank: Captain
- Unit: Company A 140th Pennsylvania Infantry
- Conflicts: Battle of Gettysburg; American Civil War
- Awards: Medal of Honor

James Milton Pipes (November 10, 1840 – December 1, 1928) was an American soldier who fought with the Union Army in the American Civil War. Pipes received his country's highest award for bravery during combat, the Medal of Honor, for actions taken on July 2, 1863 during the Battle of Gettysburg. After the war he had a brief political career including a term as Secretary of State of West Virginia from 1869 to 1871.

== Civil War service ==
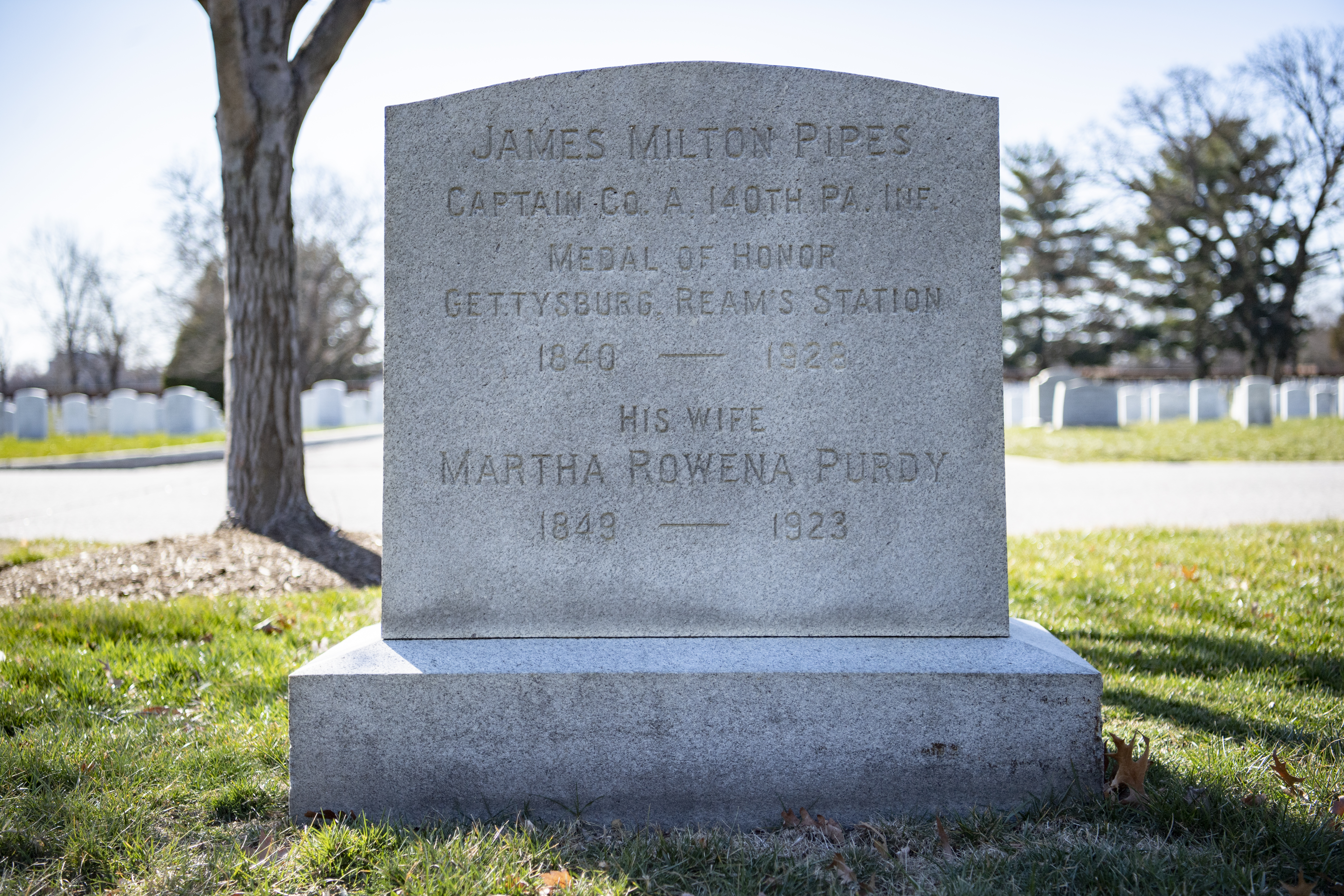
Grave at Arlington National Cemetery

On August 18, 1862, Pipes enlisted with a volunteer unit from Greene County that would become part of the 140th Pennsylvania Infantry. This unit was created by five men in western Pennsylvania, among them James J. Purman who would go on to win the Medal of Honor alongside Pipes. When the 140th was mustered, Pipes was ranked a sergeant, and Purman a second lieutenant.

In 1863, the 140th Pennsylvania Infantry fought in the Battle of Gettysburg. On the first day of battle, July 1, Pipes and Purman were on a path of retreat when they doubled back to help save a wounded soldier. After getting the soldier to safety, both men were shot in the legs. Pipes was captured by the Confederates, but was liberated by Union troops the next morning. After spending some time in a Philadelphia hospital, Pipes was promoted to the rank of Lieutenant. He returned to the field in November.

After Gettysburg, Pipes served in the Siege of Petersburg where he was promoted to captain in June 1864. On August 24, Pipes was commanding a group of soldiers guarding a section of enemy train tracks and was attacked by enemy troops. As he commanded his troops' retreat, his right arm was shot and had to be amputated that night. He was hospitalized through November, and was discharged for disability in February 1865.

== Medal of Honor citation ==
The President of the United States of America, in the name of Congress, takes pleasure in presenting the Medal of Honor to Captain James Milton Pipes, United States Army, for extraordinary heroism on 2 July 1863, while serving with Company A, 140th Pennsylvania Infantry, in action at Gettysburg, Pennsylvania. While a sergeant and retiring with his company before the rapid advance of the enemy, Captain Pipes and a companion stopped and carried to a place of safety a wounded and helpless comrade; in this act both he and his companion were severely wounded. A year later on 25 August 1864, at Reams Station, Virginia, while commanding a skirmish line, Captain Pipes voluntarily assisted in checking a flank movement of the enemy, and while so doing was severely wounded, suffering the loss of an arm.

== Post-war career ==
After the war, Pipes moved to Wheeling, West Virginia, where his family had relocated during the war. A Republican, in 1866 he was elected treasurer of Marshall County. In 1868 he was elected Secretary of State of West Virginia. In 1870 he failed at a run for re-election as the Democratic party swept all state offices after ex-Confederates were given their voting rights back. Pipes was a member of the 1872 state constitutional convention. Starting in 1879 he held a series of patronage positions in the federal government in Washington, DC.

== Personal life ==
In December 1869 he received an artificial arm. The following year he married Martha Rowena Purdy (1849-1923) and had five children by her.

Pipes died of pneumonia in 1928 and was buried at Arlington National Cemetery.
