= James Wiley (Medal of Honor) =

- Born: c. 1835
- Died: February 7, 1865 (aged 29-30); Andersonville, Georgia
- Burial place: Andersonville National Cemetery
- Military career
- Allegiance: United States of America
- Branch: United States Army
- Rank: Sergeant
- Units: (New York (state)) Company B, 59th New York Volunteer Infantry
- Conflicts: Battle of Gettysburg; American Civil War
- Awards: Medal of Honor

James Wiley (c. 1835 – February 7, 1865) was an American soldier who fought with the Union Army in the American Civil War. Wiley received his country's highest award for bravery during combat, the Medal of Honor, for actions taken on July 3, 1863, during the Battle of Gettysburg.

== Biography ==
On July 2, 1863, during the Battle of Gettysburg, Wiley captured the flag of the 48th Georgia. He was awarded with the Medal of Honor following this action.

Following Gettysburg, Wiley was captured during the Siege of Petersburg and taken to a prisoner of war camp in Andersonville, Georgia. He died at the camp on February 7, 1865.

== Medal of Honor citation ==
The President of the United States of America, in the name of Congress, takes pride in presenting the Medal of Honor (Posthumously) to Sergeant James Wiley, United States Army, for extraordinary heroism on 3 July 1863, while serving with Company B, 59th New York Infantry, in action at Gettysburg, Pennsylvania, for capture of flag of a Georgia regiment.
