= 14th Connecticut Infantry Regiment =

14th Regiment Connecticut Volunteer Infantry
- Active: August 23, 1862, to April 10, 1865
- Country: United States
- Allegiance: Union
- Branch: Infantry
- Size: 1,015 men (at formation); 100 men (after Gettysburg)
- Nickname: Nutmeg Regiment
- Equipment: Springfield rifled muskets
- Engagements: American Civil War: Battle of Antietam; Battle of Fredericksburg; Battle of Chancellorsville; Gettysburg campaign; Battle of Gettysburg; Bristoe Campaign; Overland Campaign; Siege of Petersburg; Appomattox Campaign

The 14th Connecticut Infantry Regiment, also known as the Nutmeg Regiment, was an infantry regiment that participated in the American Civil War. It participated in the Battle of Gettysburg, helping to repulse the Confederate attack on the third day known as Pickett's Charge.

The 14th Connecticut Infantry Regiment was organized at Hartford, Connecticut, on August 23, 1862, and mustered into the volunteer army.

The organization of the Fourteenth Regiment began under the order promulgated May 22, 1862, to furnish Connecticut's contingent of the fifty thousand men called for by the War Department at Washington to go into "Camp of Instruction" at Annapolis, Md. Recruiting for the regiment began at once, but progressed slowly until, in July, after the Union reverses on the peninsula, the President called for three hundred thousand volunteers for three years or the war, when it received a tremendous impulse and the regiment filled up rapidly, being the first one to complete its organization under that call. It was recruited from the state at large, having its rendezvous, named "Camp Foote," at Hartford.

Initially, 1,015 men were mustered under the command of Colonel Dwight Morris. As an example, over the course of the war, 181 men served in Company G, including replacements, and, of these, 61 were from the Clinton/Guilford/Madison area.

Major battles of the 14th Connecticut included: Antietam Md., Fredericksburg Va., Chancellorsville Va., Gettysburg Pa., Falling Waters Va., Auburn Va., Bristoe Station Va., Blackburn's Ford Va., Mine Run Va., Morton's Ford, Va., Wilderness Va., Laurel Hill Va., Spotsylvania Va., North Anna River, Va., Tolopotomy Va., Cold Harbor Va., Cold Harbor Va. (three days later), Petersburg Va., Deep Bottom Va., Ream's Station Va., Boydton Plank Road Va., Hatchers Run Va. Feb 5. 1865, Hatchers Run Va. March 25, 1865, Highbridge, Farmville Va. and Surrender of Lee's Army March 30 to April 10, 1865.

Initially, the regiment did not augment its ranks by replacing the dead or wounded with fresh troops. When it arrived at Gettysburg on July 2, 1863, the regiment was reduced to 165 officers and men. After the Battle of Gettysburg, they were down to 100. Common practice in other units also was not to replace personnel; the 14th became one of the first exceptions to this rule in late July 1863 following Gettysburg, when scores of men were recruited in New Haven County to bolster the heavily depleted ranks.

== Formation of the Regiment ==
In 1861, in response to Abraham Lincoln's call for five hundred thousand men, Connecticut was filled its quota of 13,037 men with 13 regiments. On May 21, the War Department would accept an additional regiment for a "Camp of Instruction" and announced the formation the following day. It had the same requirements as the other regiments, with members to serve three years or until the war's end. It would rally at Camp Foote in Hartford, Connecticut, under the command of Colonel Dwight Morris. Volunteers were slow to enlist; with the prospect of an indefinite "Camp of Instruction" and the quota having been initially met. As the war continued, three hundred thousand more men were requested, with Connecticut's quota was listed as 7,145 being divided into six regiments. On July 1, 1862, Governor Buckingham announced the need for more men and by August 22 the quota was filled. It was mustered by Colonel Webb the following day.

== Companies ==
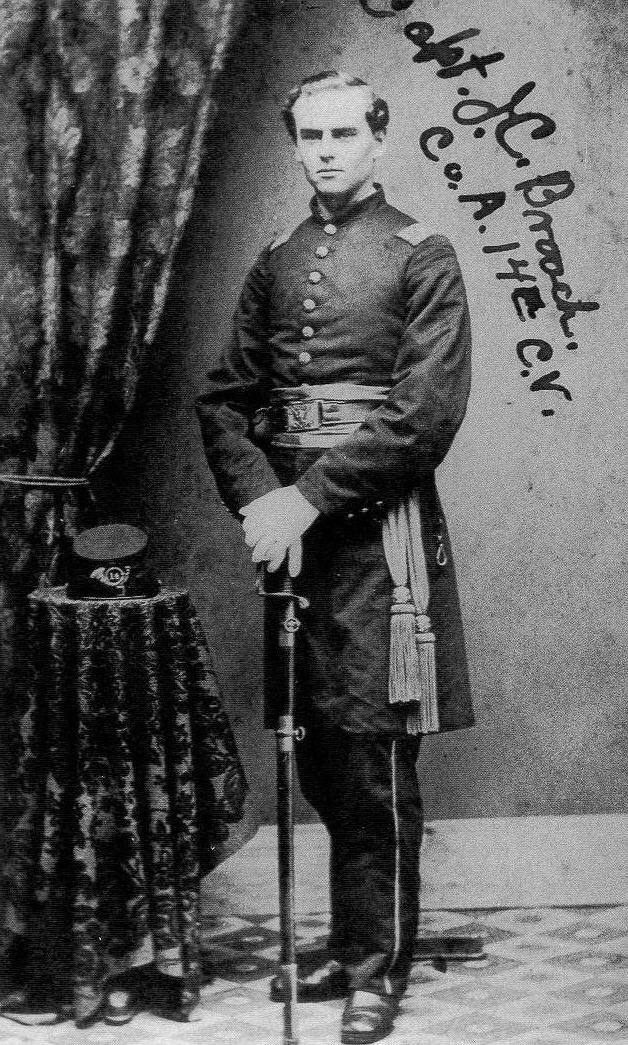
Captain John C. Broatch, Company A

Numbering 1,015 men, Company A and B were assigned Sharp's rifle and the rest of regiment was assigned the Springfield rifle.

Company	Captains
Company A	James Merritt John C. Broatch
Company B	Elijah Gibbons
Company C	Samuel Carpenter
Company D	Thomas Burpee
Company E	William Tubbs
Company F	Jarvis Blinn, Samuel Moore
Company G	Samuel Willard
Company H	Samuel Davis
Company I	Isaac Bronson
Company K	Robert Gillette

== Moving out ==
On August 25, 1862, the 14th Regiment broke camp and headed towards Washington. The first non-fatal casualty of was not during action, but of accident when Frederick Shalk lost his footing and fell 30 feet in Easton, Pennsylvania. The regiment was assigned to the 2nd Brigade of the 3rd Division, Second Army Corps under Dwight Morris; with Lieutenant Colonel S.H. Perkins in charge of the regiment. On September 7, it was ordered to move out with the army, passing through Rockville, Maryland to the Rockville Camp. The first casualty, James McVay, died of exhaustion from the march as the regiment approached the camp. On September 11, the regiment marched to Clarksburg, Maryland and reached Frederick City, Maryland on September 13. It marched to South Mountain and arrived just after Battle of South Mountain's end on September 14.

== Battle of Antietam ==
On September 17, 1862, the regiment's first action was at the Battle of Antietam. The regiment traveled along the flank and entered the East Woods, passing through Mumma's orchard and cornfield toward the confederate line. The green troops performed well, but casualties came from confederate fire and accident; including a case of an exploding shell of Company D which killed 3 and wounded 4. In total, 21 men were killed and 88 wounded and 28 missing. The death of Company F's captain Blinn was filled by Samuel Moore.

== Battle of Fredericksburg ==
On September 22, the regiment started to march towards Harper's Ferry. Crossing the Shenandoah on October 30, the regiment marched on to Warrenton, Virginia, arriving on November 7. On November 15, the regiment moved out again, making camp at Belle Plain before marching to Fredericksburg on December 10. In the course of battle, 10 men were killed, 92 were wounded and 20 were listed as missing, among the dead was Lieutenant Canfield and Captain Gibbons of Company B and the Lieutenant-Colonel Perkins was wounded.

== Battle of Gettysburg ==
The regiment arrived at Gettysburg late on July 2, after the second day's fighting had died down. The regiment, with about 160 men, was positioned in the center of the Union line on Cemetery Ridge. The next day, the regiment saw combat repelling what would be known as "Pickett's Charge," when they fought elements of the 13th Alabama, 14th Tennessee, and 26th North Carolina Infantry Regiments. During the entire battle, the regiment lost about 60 men.

=== Medal of Honor ===
Name: William B. Hincks
Rank: Sergeant Major
Service: Army
Division: 14th Connecticut Infantry
Date of Action: July 3, 1863
Date of Issue: December 1, 1864

The President of the United States of America, in the name of Congress, takes pleasure in presenting the Medal of Honor to Sergeant Major William B. Hincks, United States Army, for extraordinary heroism on 3 July 1863, while serving with 14th Connecticut Infantry, in action at Gettysburg, Pennsylvania. During the high-water mark of Pickett's charge on 3 July 1863 the colors of the 14th Tennessee Infantry C.S.A. were planted 50 yards in front of the center of Sergeant Major Hincks' regiment. There were no Confederates standing near it but several were lying down around it. "Major Ellis called for volunteers to capture the flag and instantly Major Hincks, Major Broatch and Lieutenant Brigham leaped the wall. Brigham was shot down by a retreating rebel, but the other two sped on, Hincks finally outstripping Broatch ran straight and swift for the color, amid a storm of shot. Swinging his saber over the prostrate Confederates and uttering a terrific yell, he seized the flag and hastily returned to the line."

The 14th Tennessee's colors carried 12 battle honors on its flag. The devotion to duty shown by Sergeant Major Hincks gave encouragement to many of his comrades at a crucial moment of the battle.

== See also ==
- List of Connecticut Civil War units
- Joseph Pierce (soldier)
