= 13th Massachusetts Infantry Regiment =

Infantry regiment in the Union Army during the American Civil War

13th Regiment Massachusetts Volunteer Infantry
- Active: July 16, 1861, 1861–August 1, 1864
- Country: United States of America
- Allegiance: Union
- Branch: Union Army
- Type: Infantry
- Part of: In 1863: 1st Brigade (Paul's), 2nd Division (Robinson's), I Corps, Army of the Potomac
- Engagements: Battle of Bolivar Heights; Battle of Cedar Mountain; Battle of Thoroughfare Gap; Second Battle of Bull Run; Battle of Chantilly; Battle of South Mountain; Battle of Antietam; Battle of Fredericksburg; Battle of Chancellorsville; Battle of Gettysburg; Second Battle of Rappahannock Station; Battle of Morton's Ford; Battle of the Wilderness; Battle of Spotsylvania Court House; Battle of North Anna; Battle of Totopotomoy Creek; Battle of Cold Harbor; Siege of Petersburg

Commanders
- Notable commanders: Colonel Samuel H. Leonard

Insignia
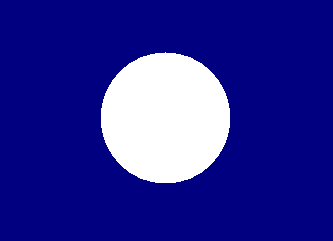
- I Corps badge (2nd Division)

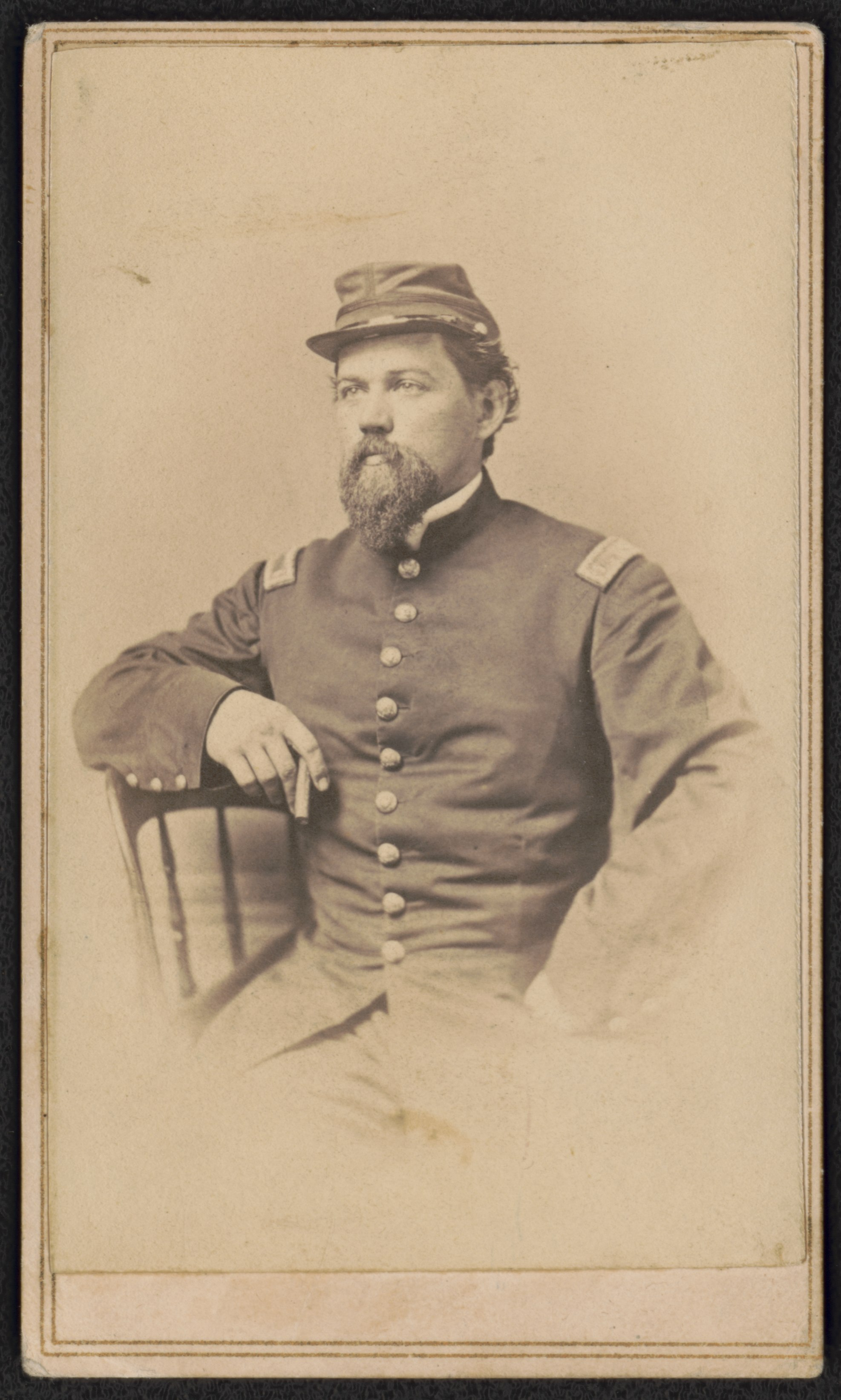
Lieutenant David F. Hicks of Co. B, 13th Massachusetts Infantry Regiment. From the Liljenquist Family Collection of Civil War Photographs, Prints and Photographs Division, Library of Congress.

The 13th Regiment Massachusetts Volunteer Infantry was an infantry regiment in the Union Army during the American Civil War. It was formed on July 16, 1861, at Fort Independence in Boston, Massachusetts. Its original commander was Colonel Samuel H. Leonard.

== Organization and assignments ==
The 13th Massachusetts Volunteer Infantry was organized at Fort Independence in Boston, Massachusetts, on June 16, 1861. It left for Washington, D.C., on July 30. Attached to Stile's Brigade, Banks' Division, Army of the Potomac, to October, 1861. Abercrombie's Brigade, Banks' Division, to March, 1862. 2nd Brigade, 1st Division, Banks' 5th Army Corps and Dept. of the Shenandoah, to May, 1862. 3rd Brigade, 2nd Division, Dept. of the Rappahannock, to June, 1862. 3rd Brigade, 2nd Division, 3rd Army Corps, Army of Virginia, to September, 1862. 3rd Brigade, 2nd Division, 1st Army Corps, Army of the Potomac, to May, 1863. 1st Brigade, 2nd Division, 1st Army Corps, to March, 1864. 1st Brigade, 2nd Division, 5th Army Corps, to June, 1864. 1st Brigade, 3rd Division, 5th Army Corps, to July, 1864.

== 1861 to 1862 ==
The regiment was assigned to patrol and outpost duty on the Upper Potomac until March, 1862. It first saw action at Beller's Mill, near Harper's Ferry, Virginia, on September 2, 1861. Pritchard's Mills September 18 (2 Cos.). Bolivar Heights near Harper's Ferry, October 16. (Cos. "C," "D," "I" and "K" detached at Hancock, Md., January 5–30, 1862.) Occupation of Winchester, Virginia, March 12. Pursuit of Jackson up the Shenandoah Valley from March 24 to April 27. Guard duty on the Orange & Alexandria Railroad May 3 to 18. Battle of Cedar Mountain on August 9. Pope's Campaign in Northern Virginia August 16 to September 2. Battle of Thoroughfare Gap on August 28. 2nd Battle of Bull Run on August 30. Battle of Chantilly September 1. Served in the Maryland Campaign September to October. Battles of South Mountain September 14, and the Battle of Antietam September 16–17. At Sharpsburg until October 30. Movement to Warrenton, thence to Falmouth, Virginia, October 30 to November 19. Fought at the Battle of Fredericksburg, Virginia, from December 12 to 15.

== 1863 ==
The regiment was part of the infamous "Mud March" January 20–24, 1863. At Falmouth and Belle Plain until April 27. Participated in the Chancellorsville Campaign April 27 to May 6. Operations at Pollock's Mill Creek April 29-May 2. Fitzhugh's Crossing April 29–30. Battle of Chancellorsville May 2–5. Gettysburg campaign June 11-July 24. Battle of Gettysburg July 1–3. Picket duty along the Rapidan until October --. Bristoe Campaign October 9–22. Advance to line of the Rappahanock November 7–8. Mine Run Campaign November 26-December 2.

== 1864 ==
Duty on the Orange & Alexandria Railroad until April, 1864. Demonstrations on the Rapidan February 6–7. Campaign from the Rapidan to the James May–June. Battle of the Wilderness May 5–7; Spottsylvania May 8–12; Spottsylvania Court House May 12–21. Assault on the Salient May 12. North Anna River May 23–26. Jericho Ford May 23. Line of the Pamunkey June 26–28. Totopotomoy May 28–31. Cold Harbor June 1–12. Bethesda Church June 1–3. White Oak Swamp June 13. Before Petersburg June 16–18. Siege of Petersburg June 16-July 14. Mustered out August 1, 1864.

== Casualties ==
The regiment lost during service four officers and 117 enlisted men who were killed or mortally wounded as well as 40 enlisted men by disease. The total of those who died in service was 161.

== See also ==
- Massachusetts in the Civil War
- List of Massachusetts Civil War units
- John Brown Bell, taken from Virginia by members of Company I of the regiment and later moved to Massachusetts
