= 64th New York Infantry Regiment =

- Active: December, 1861 (mustered in) to July 14, 1865 (mustered out)
- Country: United States of America
- Allegiance: Union
- Branch: Union Army
- Type: Infantry
- Size: 830 (Note: As reported back to Adjutant General Hillhouse upon departure from New York on December 10, 1861)
- Nickname: 1st Cattaraugus Regiment
- Equipment: Pattern 1853 Enfield (.577 caliber, rifled), Fusil d'Infanterie Mle 1842 (18mm/.69 caliber, rifled), Model 1842 Springfield Muskets (.69 caliber, smoothbore), and Model 1831 Prussian Potzdam Musket (.69 caliber, smoothbore)
- Engagements: American Civil War: Battle of Yorktown; Battle of Fair Oaks; Seven Days' Battles; Battle of Antietam; Battle of Fredericksburg; Battle of Chancellorsville; Battle of Gettysburg; Battle of Bristoe Station; Mine Run Campaign; Battle of the Wilderness; Battle of Spotsylvania Courthouse; Battle of Cold Harbor; Siege of Petersburg; First and Second Battles of Deep Bottom; Appomattox Campaign; Battle of Farmville (Cumberland Church); Battle of Appomattox Court House

Commanders
- Colonel: Thomas J. Parker
- Colonel: Daniel C. Bingham
- Colonel: Leman W. Bradley
- Colonel: William Glenny

Insignia
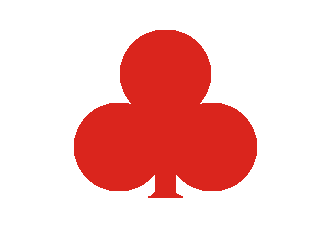
- 1st Division, II Corps

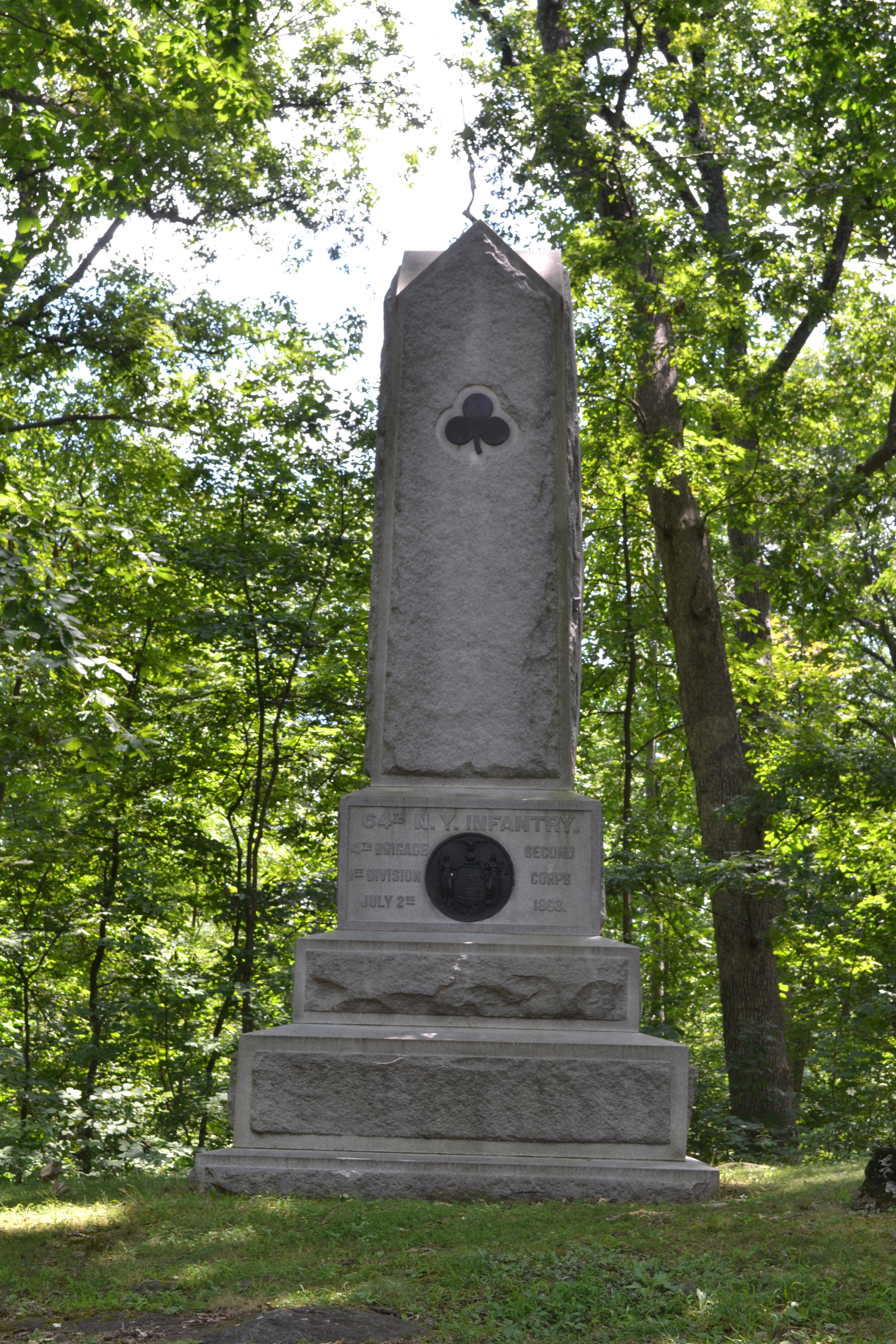
Monument to the 64th New York Volunteer Infantry at Gettysburg

The 64th New York Infantry Regiment, the "First Cattaraugus Regiment", was an infantry regiment of the Union Army during the American Civil War.

== Service ==
The regiment was organized on November 13, 1861, in Elmira, and there mustered in the service of the United States for three years, in December, 1861. The 64th State Militia formed the nucleus of the regiment. The companies were recruited principally:

- A at Gowanda
- B at Randolph
- C at Otto
- D at Rushford
- E at Ithaca
- F at Little Valley
- G at Wellsville
- H at Oswego
- I at Olean
- K at Leon

The regiment left the state December 10, 1861. Between December 1861 and July 1865, the regiment was a part of the Army of the Potomac (AoP) in the eastern theater of the Rebellion. It served in the major campaigns of that theater.

In its initial duty, it provided security near the capitol and in January, it became part of the provisional brigade of Casey's division. During McClellan's building of the AoP, on March 13, it joined the 1st brigade, 1st division, II Corps, and went to the Peninsula with the army. The regiment was present during the siege of Yorktown, but received its first real test at Fair Oaks, where it behaved with great steadiness under a fire which killed or wounded 173 of its members. It was active in the Seven Days' battles and then went into camp at Harrison's landing.

In the Virginia Campaign, it arrived at Second Bull Run too late to participate in that battle. It was on the left flank of II Corps at Antietam, in Caldwell's brigade (Note: It was on the Irish Brigade's left flank during its attack on the sunken road.) where MGEN Richardson was killed and Hancock succeeded to the command of the division. At Fredericksburg, in the famous assault of Hancock's division on Marye's heights, the loss of the regiment was 72 in killed and wounded and immediately afterward it went into camp near Falmouth.

At Chancellorsville in May, 1863, the 64th was placed on the skirmish line under COL Nelson A. Miles and shared in the stubborn defense made by the regiments under his command, for which they won the highest commendation. The regiment moved in June to Gettysburg, where the division, under Caldwell, fought brilliantly on July 2, in "The Wheatfield" and on the July 3, defended its position stubbornly against Pickett's assault. At Gettysburg, it suffered 98 killed, wounded or missing out of 205 engaged. The II Corps fought in October at Auburn and Bristoe Station, where the 64th suffered severe loss. It participated in the Mine Run movement and established winter quarters near Brandy Station.

During the winter of 1863-64 a sufficient number of the regiment reenlisted to secure its continuance in the field as a veteran organization, but after the original members not reenlisted were mustered out in the autumn of 1864 it was necessary to consolidate it into a battalion of six companies, for which new people were recruited, A, B, D, E, G and H. It served through the Wilderness campaign, throughout the siege of Petersburg and in the pursuit of Lee's Army to Appomattox, losing 16 in killed and wounded at Farmville.

Out of a total enrollment of 1,313, the regiment lost during service 182 by death from wounds and 129 from other causes. The division in which it served saw the "hardest service and suffered the most heavy losses of any in the army and the 64th was one of the finest fighting regiments in the war. It bore without flinching the severest trials and won fame and glory for itself and the state." It was mustered out at Washington, July 14, 1865.

== Affiliations, battle honors, detailed service, and casualties ==
=== Organizational affiliation ===
Attached to:

- Casey's Provisional Division, Division of the Potomac (AoP), to January, 1862.
- Howard's Brigade, Sumner's Division, AoP, to March, 1862.
- 1st Brigade, 1st Division, II Corps, AoP, to June, 1862.
- 3rd Brigade, 1st Division, II Corps, AoP, to August, 1862.
- 1st Brigade, 1st Division, II Corps, AoP, to April, 1863.
- 4th Brigade, 1st Division, II Corps, AoP, to July, 1865.

=== List of battles ===
The official list of battles in which the regiment bore a part:

- Battle of Yorktown
- Battle of Fair Oaks
- Seven Days' Battles
- Battle of Antietam
- Battle of Fredericksburg
- Battle of Chancellorsville
- Battle of Gettysburg
- Battle of Bristoe Station
- Mine Run Campaign
- Battle of the Wilderness
- Battle of Spotsylvania Courthouse
- Battle of Cold Harbor
- Siege of Petersburg
- First and Second Battles of Deep Bottom
- Appomattox Campaign
- Battle of Farmville (Cumberland Church)
- Battle of Appomattox Court House

=== Detailed service ===
==== 1861 ====
- Left New York for Washington, D.C., December 10.
- Duty in the Defences of Washington, DC, until March, 1862.

==== 1862 ====
- Advance on Manassas, VA, March 10–15.
- Ordered to the Peninsula March 27.
- Siege of Yorktown April 16-May 4. (Note: Captain Samuel Barstow of Company H died at Fortress Monroe, Virginia)
- Battle of Fair Oaks, Seven Pines, May 31-June 1. (Note: Lieutenant Ezra Kendall and 46 enlisted men were killed or mortally wounded and Lieutenant Colonel Bingham, Captains Lehman W. Bradley, William Glenny, Horatio Hunt, Robert Rennick and Rufus Washburn and Lieutenants Rodney Crowley, Albert Darby, Nathaniel Cooper and 115 enlisted men were wounded.)
- Seven days before Richmond June 25-July 1. (Note: Lieutenant Leroy Hewitt and 3 enlisted men were killed or mortally wounded, 9 men were wounded and 25 missing in the fighting before Richmond.)
- Gaines' Mill, June 27.
- Peach Orchard and Savage Station June 29.
- White Oak Swamp and Glendale June 30.
- Malvern Hill July 1.
- Harrison's Landing July 8. At Harrison's Landing until August 16.
- Moved to Fort Monroe, thence to Alexandria and Centreville August 16–30.
- Cover Pope's retreat from Bull Run August 31-September 2.
- Maryland Campaign September 6–22.
- Battle of Antietam September 16–17. (Note: The regiment was temporarily under the command of Colonel Barlow of the 61st New York. It lost 10 enlisted men killed or mortally wounded and Captain Rufus Washburn and 30 enlisted men wounded. From the brigade monument at Antietam:"Caldwell's Brigade relieved Meagher's and became heavily engaged with the Confederate Infantry occupying the Sunken Road and Piper's cornfield south of it. After an obstinate contest, the Brigade succeeded in dislodging the Confederates from the Sunken Road and, having repelled several attempts to turn its flanks, advanced to the high ground overlooking Piper's house, where it was halted by command of General Richardson.")
- Moved to Harpers Ferry September 22, and duty there until October 29.
- Advance up Loudon Valley and movement to Falmouth, Va., October 29-November 17.
- Battle of Fredericksburg December 11–15. (Forlorn Hope to cross Rappahannock at Fredericksburg December 11.) (Note: Lieutenant Fredrick Parker and 10 enlisted men were killed or mortally wounded and Major Brooks and 60 enlisted men were wounded in the assault on Marye's Heights.)
- Duty at Falmouth, Va., until April 27, 1863.

==== 1863 ====
- "Mud March" January 20–24.
- Chancellorsville Campaign April 27-May 6.
- Battle of Chancellorsville May 1–5. (Note: The regiment lost 18 enlisted men killed or mortally wounded, Colonel Bingham, Lieutenant William Roller and 17 enlisted men wounded, and 6 men missing)
- Gettysburg Campaign June 11-July 24.
- Battle of Gettysburg July 1–4. (Note: The regiment was commanded by Colonel David G. Bingham, who was wounded on July 2nd. Major Leman W. Bradley then took command of the regiment although he was also lightly wounded. The 64th brought 237 men to the field. Captains Henry Fuller and Alfred Lewis, Lieutenants Willis Babcock and Ira Thurber and 19 enlisted were men killed or mortally wounded, Colonel Bingham, Major Bradley, Captain Rodney Crowley, Lieutenants James Messervey, James Pettit and Charles Soule and 51 enlisted men wounded and 17 men missing)
- Pursuit of Lee July 5–24. Duty on line of the Rappahannock till October.
- Advance from the Rappahannock to the Rapidan September 13–17.
- Bristoe Campaign October 9–22. (Note: The regiment lost 5 killed, 4 wounded and 8 missing at Auburn and 1 killed, 7 wounded and 17 missing at Bristoe Station.)
- Bristoe Station October 14.
- Advance to line of the Rappahannock November 7–8.
- Mine Run Campaign November 26-December 2. (Note: The regiment lost 1 enlisted man killed and Lieutenant Orvel Willard and 1 enlisted man wounded.)
- At and near Stevensburg until May 1864.

==== 1864 ====
- Demonstration on the Rapidan February 6–7.
- Campaign from the Rapidan to the James May–June.
- Battles of the Wilderness May 5–7.
- Spotsylvania May 8–12.
- Po River May 10.
- Spotsylvania Court House May 12–21.
- Assault on the Salient May 12.
- North Anna River May 23–26.
- On line of the Pamunkey May 26–28.
- Totopotomoy May 28–31.
- Cold Harbor June 1–12.
- Before Petersburg June 16–18.
- Siege of Petersburg June 16, 1864, to April 2, 1865.
- Jerusalem Plank Road June 22–23, 1864.
- Demonstration north of the James July 27–29.
- Deep Bottom July 27–28.
- Strawberry Plains, Second Battle of Deep Bottom, August 14–18.
- Ream's Station August 25.
- Reconnaissance to Hatcher's Run December 9–10.

==== 1865 ====
- Dabney's Mills, Hatcher's Run, February 5–7, 1865.
- Watkin's House March 25.
- Appomattox Campaign March 28-April 9.
- Dabney's Mills, Hatcher's Run, February 5–7, 1865.
- Watkins' House March 25.
- Appomattox Campaign March 28-April 9.
- Hatcher's Run or Boydton Road March 29–31.
- White Oak Road March 31.
- Sutherland Station April 2.
- Fall of Petersburg April 2.
- Sailor's Creek April 6.
- High Bridge and Farmville April 7.
- Appomattox Court House April 9. Surrender of Lee and his army.
- At Burkesville until May 2.
- March to Washington May 2–12.
- Grand Review of the Armies May 23.
- Duty at Washington until June 30.

=== Casualties ===
The regiment lost a total of 294 men during service; 14 officers and 147 enlisted men killed or mortally wounded, 133 enlisted men died of disease.

== Armament ==
Soldiers in the pre-existing militia companies were armed with 480 Model 1842 Muskets. The State of New York also purchased Enfield Pattern 1853 rifle-muskets. Some of these had been manufactured by contract in 1856 in Windsor, Vermont by the Robbins and Lawrence Armory (R&L). (Note: The company's first order was for 10,000 model 1841 rifles for $11.90 each. R&L also received the contract to upgrade the M1841s they made in the 1855-1856 upgrade. They had also been able to sell gun making machinery (150 in all), to upgrade the new Enfield Armory in England. The British also awarded a later contract during the Crimean War for 25,000 Enfield P1853 and P1856e rifles. The contract's stiff penalty clause for missing the production schedule caused R&L to go bankrupt in 1859. Lamon, Goodnow and Yale (LG&Y) bought the factory to make sewing machines, but the onset of the war led them to continue producing the P1853, P1856, and licensed Sharps 1859s for the duration of the war.) They also imported P1853 Enfields that had been manufactured in Liege, Belgium. The 64th New York was an 1861, Army of the Potomac, three-year volunteer regiment built around a core of prewar militia, that greatly increased the number of men under arms in the federal army. As with many of these volunteers, initially, there were not enough Model 1842s to go around so the new volunteer companies received 480 Pattern 1853 rifles, both R&L and Liege. As the service continued, the 1842 muskets were gradually replaced by imported French Fusil d'Infanterie Mle 1842 rifle muskets. By the end of the first full year of hard campaigning, the regimented reported possession of 344 Enfield P1853s, 424 Mle 1842, and 62 Prussian Potsdam smoothbore percussion muskets (.71 caliber).

=== Rifle-muskets ===
Issued weapons

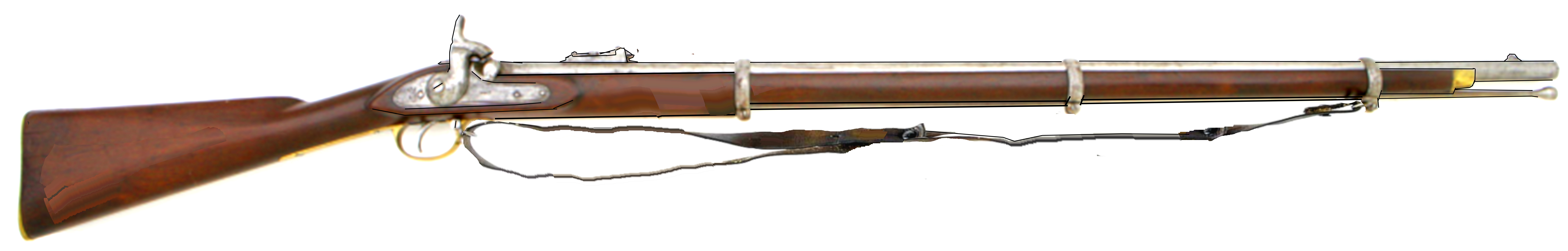
Windsor, Vermont by the Robbins and Lawrence 1856 contract

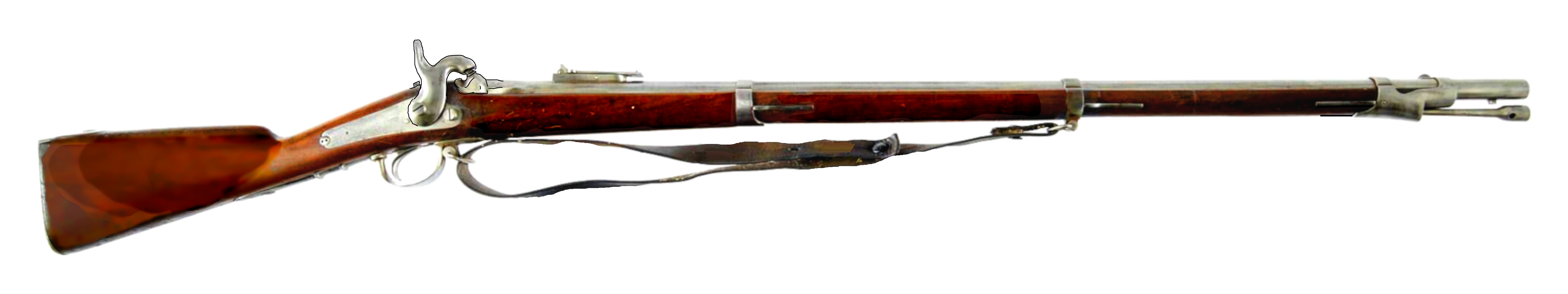
French .69 Cal Model 1842

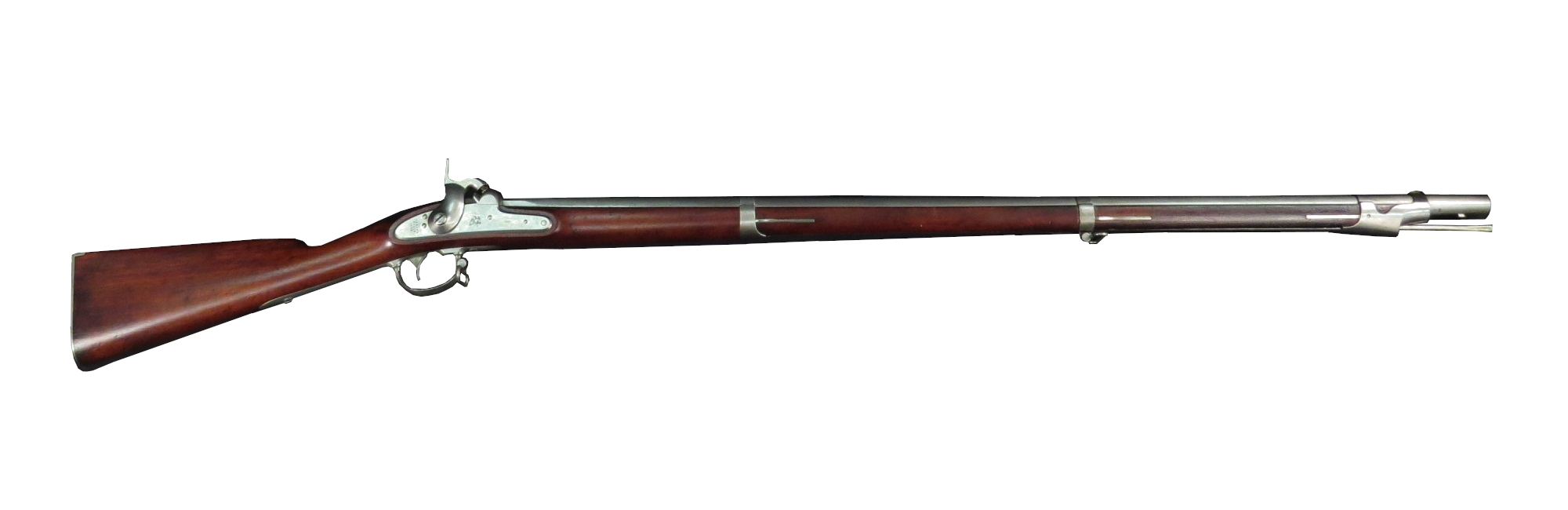
Model 1842 smoothbore musket

== Uniform ==
The men of the regiment were initially issued the standard gray militia uniform. In early 1862, they received standard blue sack coats, sky blue infantry trousers, and the sky blue infantry winter overcoat. One company, K, were known as the Irish Zouaves and wore a Zouave uniform with dark blue jackets with red trim and sky-blue zouave pantaloons with a red stripe on the outseam. This company wore a dark-blue, red-trimmed kepi. The Hardee hat and black slouch hat seemed to be more common than the kepi, or forage cap, among the remainder of the regiment.

== Commanders ==
- Colonel Thomas Jefferson Parker - November 15, 1861, to July 12, 1862. (Note: Born August 17, 1813, in Junius, he was a justice of the peace, deputy Cattaraugus county clerk, and tailor in Gowanda. A father of four, organized the 64th New York State Militia regiment in 1857. In 1861, he offered its service to the governor. He commanded the regiment from muster into federal service through the Seven Days Battles before Richmond. He resigned his commission due to family hardship, having lost his eldest son in December 1861. and returned to Gowanda in August, 1862. After the war, he was active in the Grand Army of the Republic (GAR) and helped found the Darby Post in Gowanda. He died at 94 on May 26, 1908)
- Colonel Daniel Galusha Bingham - July 12, 1862, to February 10, 1864. (Note: He was the great-grandson of a Revolutionary War veteran. From Riga and living in Ellicottville in 1861 when he enlisted, he was already suffering from tuberculosis (TB). At Fair Oaks he was severely wounded and was shortly after promoted to regimental command. At Chancellorsville and Gettysburg he led his command and was slightly wounded in both actions. Immediately after the battle of Gettysburg, the TB flared up and he took what he thought would be temporary leave to recover. He never recovered, and died from TB on July 21, 1864, in Le Roy.)
- Colonel Leman William Bradley - February 10, to August 1, 1864. (Note: Born in Sharon, CT on March 6, 1820, he was already 41 when he enlisted in the 14th New York Infantry Regiment, or "1st Oneida County Regiment" as a 1st Lieutenant on April 30, 1861. Assigned to Company K, on May 17, he was discharged for disability September 24 in Washington, D.C. Recovered by December 23, 1861 in Albany, he re-enlisted, this time with the 64th in Albany, on December 23, 1861. He joined the regiment shortly after Christmas in Washington. He served well through the Peninsula, Maryland, and Chancellorsville campaigns. By July 2, 1863, he had been promoted to Major. During the Battle of Gettysburg, he was with the 64th in the "Wheatfield" and the next day relieved Bingham as regimental commander when the latter was wounded and removed from the battlefield. Promoted to Colonel in January, he continued in command May of 1864. Wounded twice, once in each arm, he mustered out on October 5, 1864. After the war, he was also active in the GAR, dying at 92 in Hudson, NY August in 1912, at age 92.)
- Colonel William Glenny - August 1, 1864, to July 14, 1865. (Note: Born in Virgil, May 31, 1831, he was a clerk in Ithaca until he tried moving to Kansas but the violent political environment there caused his return in 1859. In April 1861, he raised a company of volunteers and as its captain joined the 64th at Elmira where it became Company E in the 64th. He was seriously wounded by a minie ball at Fair Oaks, June 1st, 1862, but returned to the 64th in a few weeks. .He was promoted to major, lieutenant colonel, brevet colonel, and colonel taking over from Bradley. He was breveted to brigadier general in July 1865 after fighting part in twenty battles and many important skirmishes. In six of the battles he led the 64th in bayonet charges. Engaged in mercantile business for a time, he was a popular postmaster of Ithaca at the behest of President Grant. After his Ithaca term expired he was appointed to prominent positions in the New York City Post office where he served for many years while keeping his residence and family in Ithaca. He was active with the GAR Sydney Post, in Ithaca. He died aged 68, January 6, 1900 in Ithaca.)

== See also ==
- List of New York Civil War regiments
