= Battle of Morton's Ford =

Battle of the American Civil War

Coordinates: 38.3746°N 77.9040°W

- Part of the American Civil War
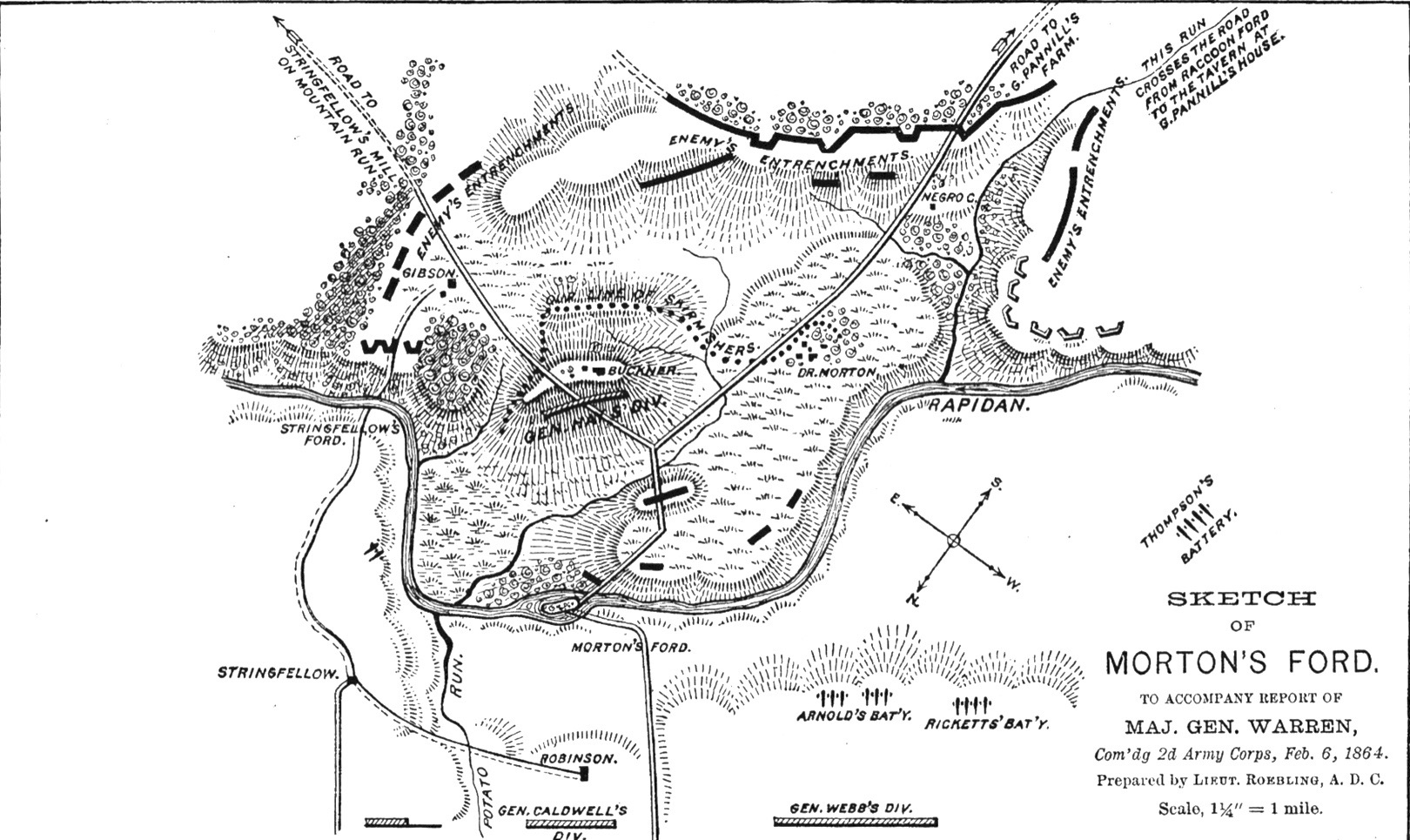
- Sketch by Lt. Washington Roebling
Date	February 6, 1864 – February 7, 1864
Location	Orange County, Virginia; Culpeper County, Virginia
Result	Inconclusive

Belligerents
United States (Union)	(Confederate States of America) CSA (Confederacy)

Commanders and leaders
John C. Caldwell	Richard S. Ewell

Strength
Corps	Corps

Casualties and losses
262	60

The Battle of Morton's Ford was a battle of the American Civil War, fought February 6–7, 1864.

To distract attention from a planned cavalry-infantry raid up the Virginia Peninsula on Richmond, the Union Army of the Potomac forced several crossings of the Rapidan River on February 6, 1864. Units of the II Corps under Maj. Gen. John C. Caldwell crossed at Morton's Ford, the I Corps at Raccoon Ford, and Union cavalry at Robertson's Ford. Confederate Lt. Gen. Richard S. Ewell's Corps of the Army of Northern Virginia resisted the crossings, with sporadic fighting and the most severe fighting at Morton's Ford. By February 7, 1864, the attacks had stalled, and the Union army withdrew during the night, with the results of the battle inconclusive.

== Background ==
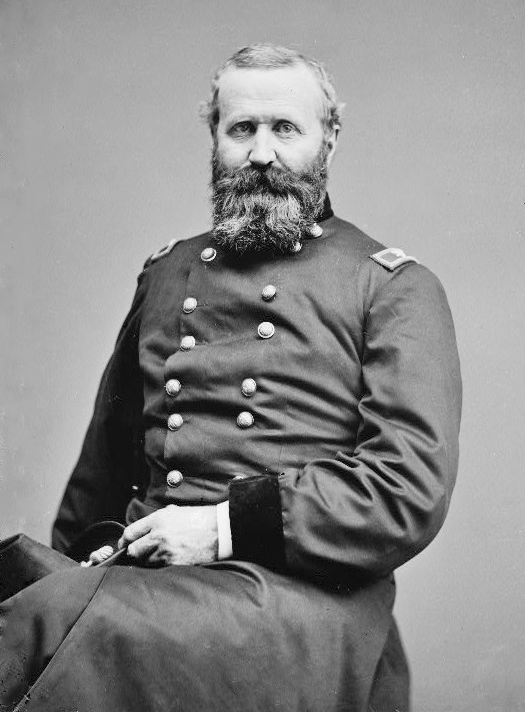
Alexander Hays

Union Major General Benjamin Butler, commanding the Army of the James in Fort Monroe, learned that General Robert E. Lee had detached a small portion of the Army of Northern Virginia to North Carolina. Convinced that Lee had sent a larger detachment than he actually did, Butler was convinced that an attack by the Army of the Potomac would force Lee to use troops from the defenses of Richmond to ward off the attack. Major General John Sedgwick, temporarily commanding the Army of the Potomac, protested that Lee had detached fewer men than Butler thought and that the local roads and weather were too poor for a winter attack. However, both Secretary of War Edwin M. Stanton and general-in-chief Henry W. Halleck overruled his objections and ordered him to make the attack on February 6.

The demonstration would take place near Morton's Ford, near a bend in the Rapidan River which formed a mile wide patch of land. Major General Edward Johnson's division of Richard Ewell's Second Corps had dug a series of entrenchments across the base of the bend. The Union II Corps, temporarily under the command of John C. Caldwell due to the illness of Gouverneur K. Warren, would move to Morton's Ford, with the I Corps marching to nearby Racoon Ford to the west and the cavalry crossing at Robertson's Ford.

== The battle ==
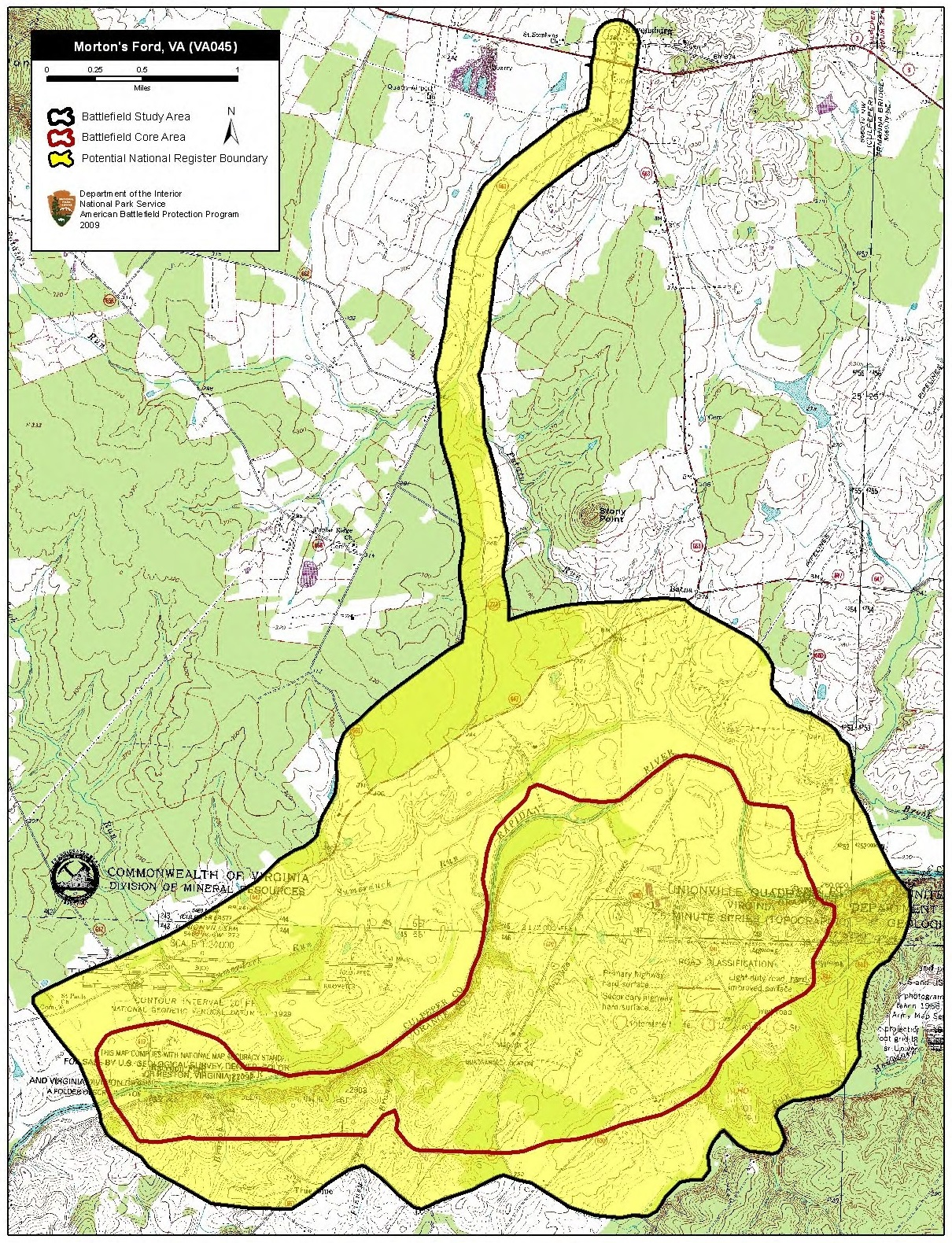
Map of Morton's Ford Battlefield core and study areas by the American Battlefield Protection Program.

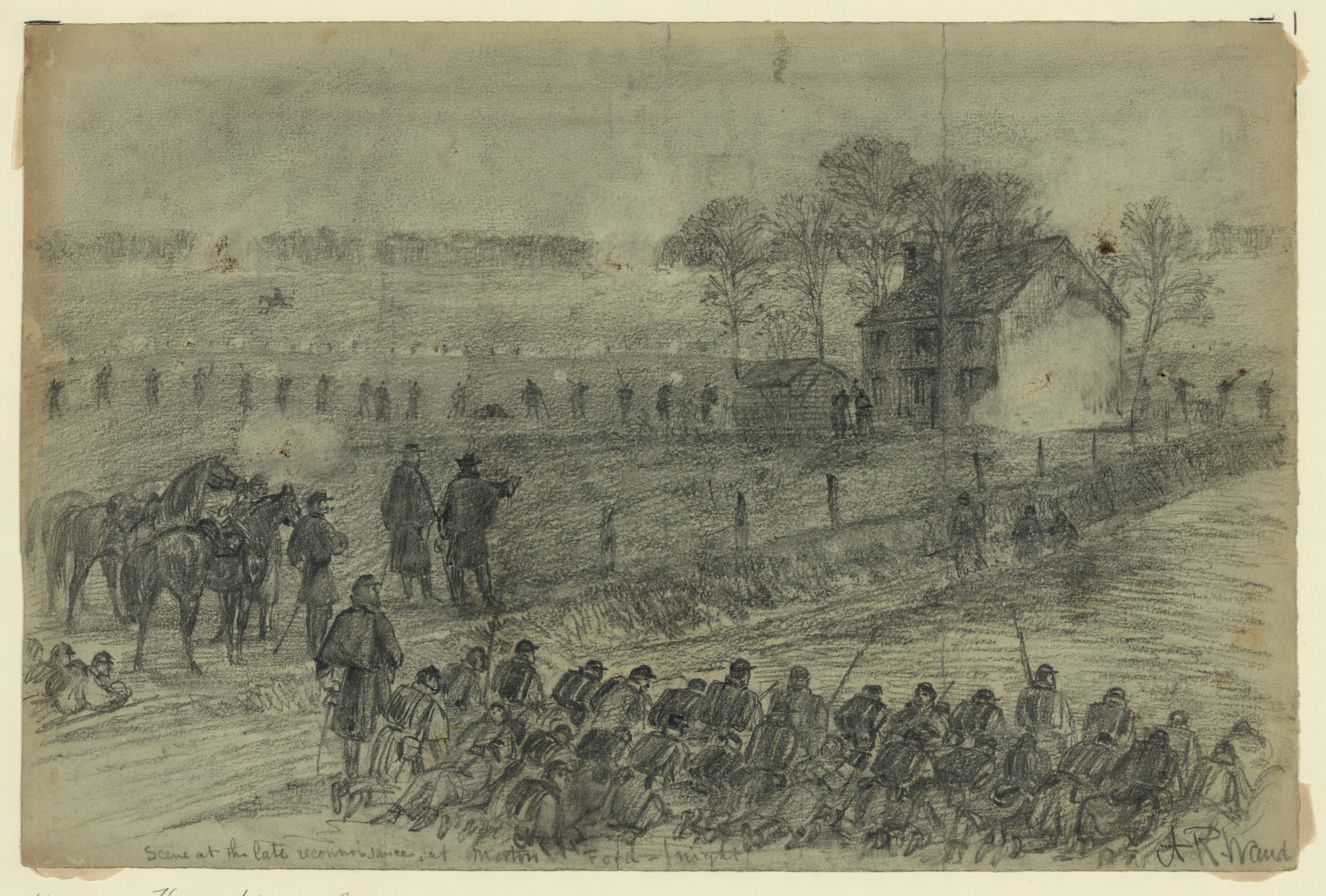
Reconnaisance [sic] at Morton's Ford, by Alfred Waud

The II Corps reached the ford about 9:30 a.m.; finding a line of pickets along the bank, 3rd Division commander Brigadier General Alexander Hays ordered three hundred men of Brigadier General Joshua Owen's 1st Brigade across the river to drive off the pickets. This was done successfully, resulting in the capture of thirty members of the Stonewall Brigade without any Union losses. The rest of Owen's brigade crossed the river but then encountered heavy artillery fire. Johnson brought up one brigade and parts of two others, along with additional artillery. At 12:30 p.m., Hays received permission from Caldwell to bring the rest of his division across the ford, which took two hours, while Caldwell positioned Union artillery on the heights north of the river; during this time Johnson continued to receive reinforcements.

Warren heard of the heavy fighting at Morton's Ford about midday and immediately started riding to the front. By 3 p.m. he arrived at the ford and, deciding that the Union position was too precarious to be held, ordered Hays' division to withdraw after nightfall. However, Johnson launched an infantry attack just as dusk was starting. Hays' right flank began to falter and a counterattack by three regiments succeeded in holding back the Confederates. At this time, Alexander S. Webb's division arrived to support Hays, until it was decided to withdraw both divisions starting about 8 p.m.

== Aftermath ==
Both divisions were back across the Rapidan by 2 a.m., with the Confederates reoccupying their entrenchments immediately afterwards. Union casualties total 262, while the Confederates lost sixty. Due to a Union deserter who revealed the Union plans to the Confederates, Butler never made an attack on Richmond, while Lee never requested reinforcements from the city. The I Corps also failed to cross the river, never getting closer than a mile and a half from Raccoon Ford.

After the battle, Hays was accused of being drunk during the battle and of acting irrationally. However, many officers, including several in his division, attested that Hays was sober throughout the engagement. All of the accusations about Hays being drunk at Morton's Ford came from the 14th Connecticut, which suffered nearly half of the Union casualties in the battle and may have felt resentment against Hays because of it.

== Sources ==
- Kennedy, Frances H. (editor) The Civil War Battlefield Guide, second edition. New York: Houghton Mifflin, 1998. ISBN 0-395-74012-6.
- Mahood, Wayne. "Tiger at Morton's Ford", in Civil War Times, Volume 41, number 7 (February 2003).
- Trinque, Bruce A. "Rebels Across the River", in America's Civil War, Volume 7, number 5 (September 1994).
- National Park Service battle description
- CWSAC Report Update
