= Bolivar Heights Battlefield =

Civil War Battlefield

Coordinates: 39°19′41″N 77°45′29″W

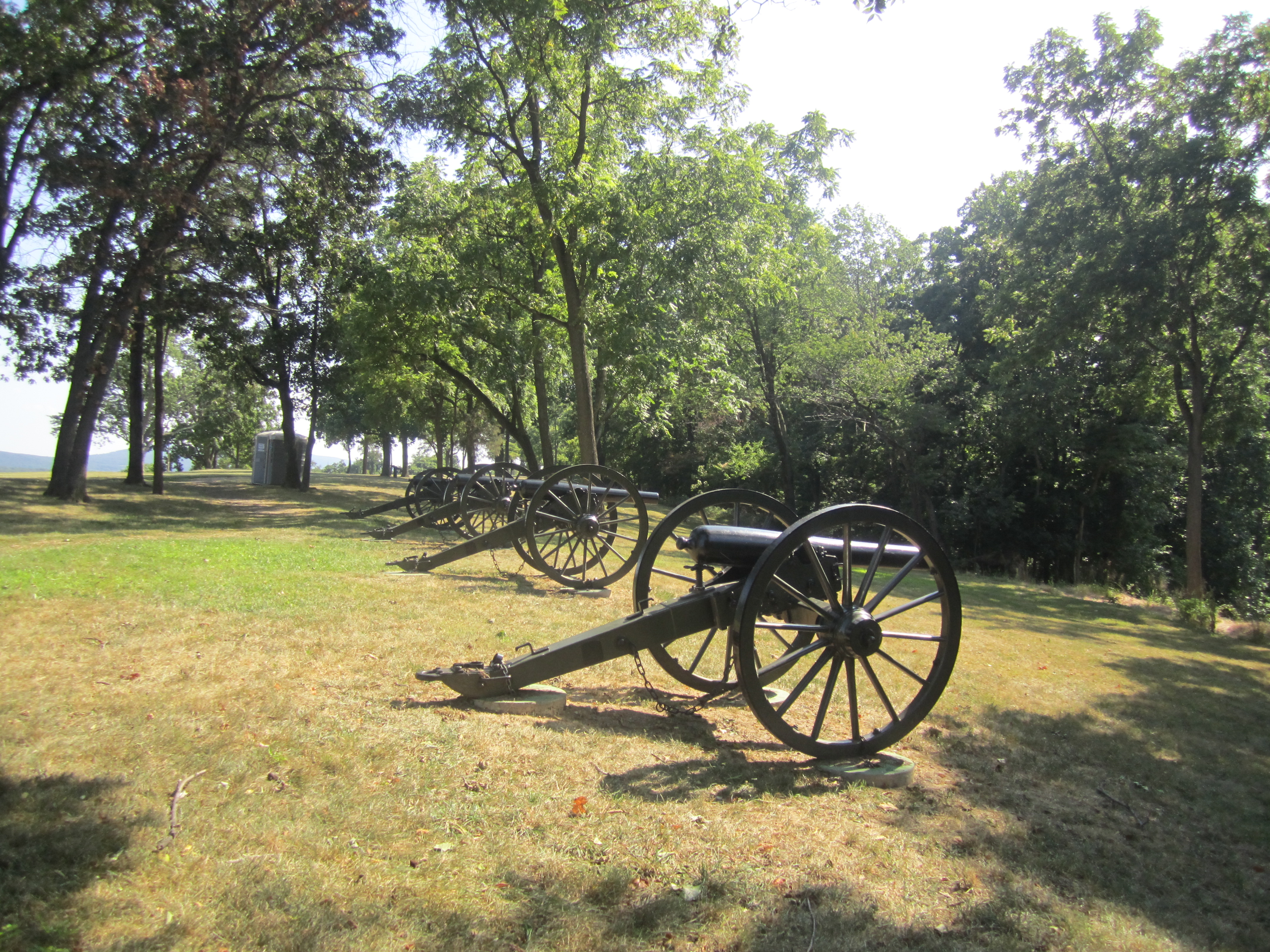
Cannons from the Battle of Harpers Ferry on Bolivar Heights

The Bolivar Heights Battlefield in Jefferson County, West Virginia, partly in the town of Bolivar, is an American Civil War battlefield which, – because of its strategic position overlooking Harpers Ferry, where the U.S. had an armory, and its placement at the head of the Shenandoah Valley – was the site of five separate engagements between Union and Confederate forces: in October 1861, May and September 1862, June 1863, and July 1864. The battlefield lies partly on the 669-foot (204 m) Bolivar Heights plateau, but also includes School House Ridge to the west, and the slopes of both, which meet at Bakerton Road. The site was also used by the armies as a campground, and, in 1864, as a Union corral and wagon yard.

The battlefield is now part of the Harpers Ferry National Historical Park, and features informational signs, cannons and a preserved defensive trench.

== Location ==
The largest part of the preserved battlefield, which includes the Union skirmish line during the Battle of Harpers Ferry, lies to the east of the town of Bolivar, to the west (School House Ridge) and east (Lower Bolivar Heights) of Bakerton Road in Jefferson County. The part of the battlefield on the plateau lies within Bolivar, to the west of the intersection of West Washington Street and Whitman Avenue.

== History ==
=== Military engagements ===
Bolivar Heights is a plateau that is 669 feet (204 meters) high, located near the town of Bolivar, West Virginia and overlooking the town of Harpers Ferry. It is one of three strategically important heights which overlook the bowl in which Harpers Ferry sits, the others being Maryland Heights in Washington County, Maryland and Loudoun Heights in Loudoun County, Virginia. During the American Civil War, control of these three heights brought control of the town and its location at the head of the Shenandoah Valley, a major strategic area during that conflict and a significant route for the movement of military forces. Bolivar Heights, being the lowest of the three, is often the preferred route.

==== Battle of Bolivar Heights ====
The first engagement on Bolivar Heights was the Battle of Bolivar Heights, which took place exactly two years after the John Brown raid, on October 16, 1861. The day before, Union Colonel John White Geary crossed the Potomac River from Maryland Heights and captured wheat stored by the Confederates near Bolivar Heights. Geary crossed the river with 600 men but sent 500 of them back that night. The next day, a Confederate force of 300 militia men armed with obsolete flintlock muskets, two companies of regular Confederate infantrymen and 230 cavalrymen under Colonel Turner Ashby attacked Geary's force, drove them back to Bolivar and nearly surrounded them. The Union force then flanked the inexperienced Confederates and in turn forced them to withdraw. The Union troops captured a Confederate 24-pound cannon that had broken down during the fight. Ashby claimed that he had withdrawn in the face of heavy Union reinforcements after holding his position for four hours. Geary greatly exaggerated the size of the Confederate force (3,000) and the number of casualties his men inflicted on them (about 150). In turn, Ashby exaggerated the Union dead, stating that his men had killed 25 Union soldiers.

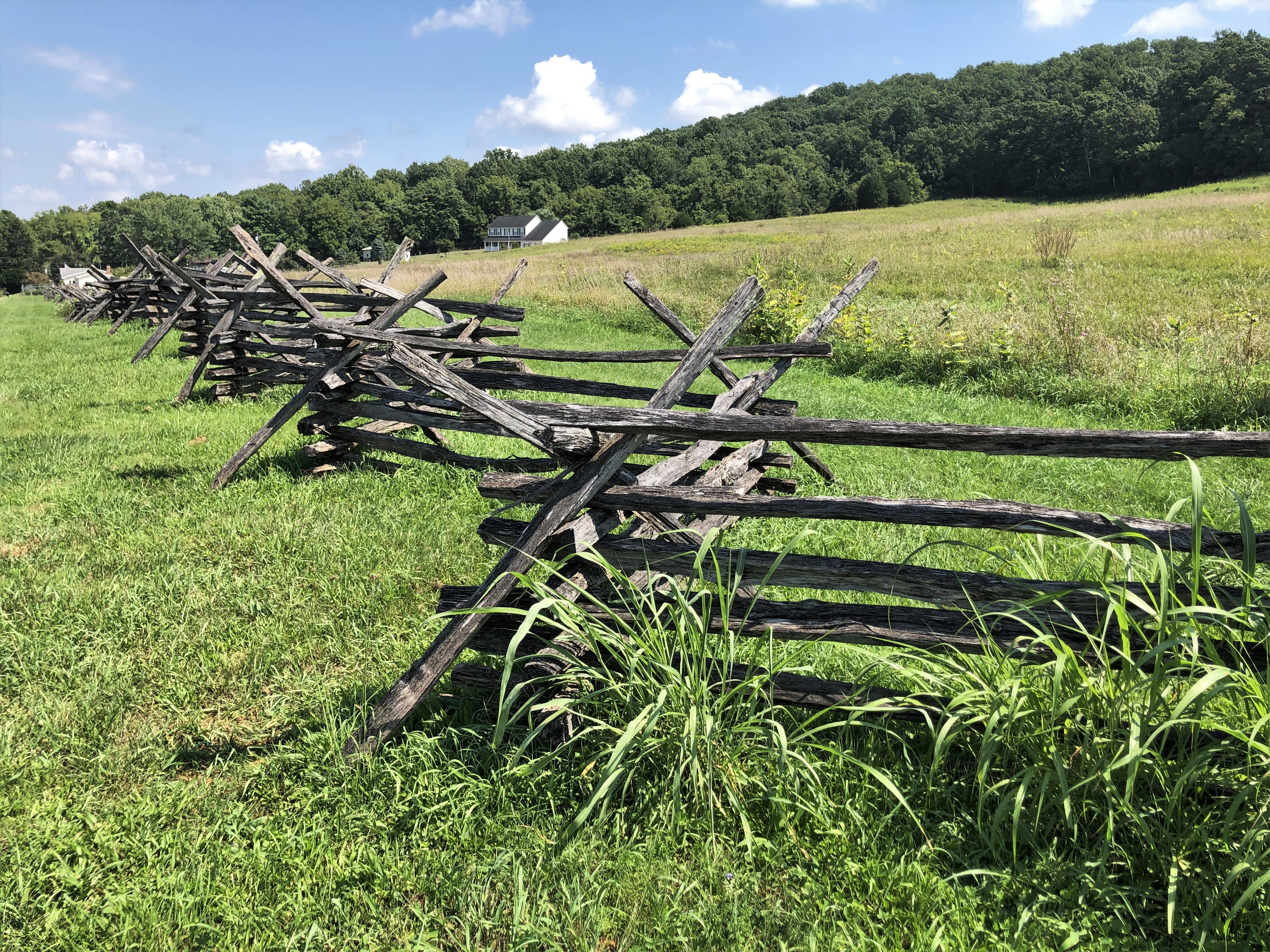
A buck-and-rail timber fence along Bakerton Road

==== During Jackson's Valley Campaign ====
On May 30, 1862, the second conflict involving Bolivar Heights took place during Major General Thomas J. "Stonewall" Jackson's Valley Campaign. After Jackson defeated all the Union forces in the Shenandoah Valley, with the exception of those in Harpers Ferry, the Union forces there were reinforced with troops led by Brigadier General Rufus B. Saxton, who positioned his forces on nearby Camp Hill. Jackson – who had been urged by General Robert E. Lee to threaten the line of the Potomac River – sent in the Stonewall Brigade while the bulk of his forces camped near Charles Town. The brigade attacked during a thunderstorm, advancing across Bolivar Heights, damaging numerous homes in the process, but the Union line held, aided by siege cannons from the Naval Battery on Maryland Heights, and the brigade retired during the night.

==== Battle of Harpers Ferry ====
The Battle of Harpers Ferry was the next engagement involving the battlefield. On September 12–15, as part of General Robert E. Lee's Maryland Campaign, in which Lee invaded the Union border state of Maryland in order to take pressure off of Virginia, where many of the war's battles had take place up to then, and with the hope of exciting Confederate sympathizers and perhaps swinging the state to the Rebel side, Lee divided his army. He sent three columns of it under Jackson by different routes to capture the Union garrison at Harpers Ferry. Jackson himself would take Bolivar Heights, while the two other forces would take Maryland Heights and Loudoun Heights, thus controlling the high ground around the Union forces.

Harpers Ferry was at the time the last remaining sizable Union force south of the Potomac River, numbering about 10.400 men, which would later be reinforced by several thousand Federals who left Martinsburg when Jackson approached on his way to battle. Capturing Harpers Ferry would protect Lee's lines of communication through the Shenandoah Valley, with the added benefit of capturing the ordnance and supplies kept there.

The garrison was commanded by Colonel Dixon S. Miles, who – perhaps interpreting literally his orders to hold the town, but perhaps forgetting those to "defend all places to the last extremity" – failed to position adequate forces on Maryland Heights to the east and Loudoun Heights to the south, insisting that the 7,000 men he had positioned on Bolivar Heights to the west could protect the town. Jackson was astounded by this lapse in military judgment, and his forces easily took the two poorly defended positions. The final stand of the Union forces took place on Bolivar Heights, with Jackson's artillery pummeling them from the taken heights and from School House Ridge to the west. Miles, not realizing that General George B. McClellan, in command of the Army of the Potomac, was in motion to try to relieve him – he never received the message McClellan had sent to him by courier – and seeing that there was no hope of defeating Jackson, held a council of war with his senior officers, and raised the white flag of surrender. Miles himself was fatally wounded by an artillery shell before he could personally surrender.

The Union troops were all paroled, promising not to return to fighting until they were officially exchanged for Southern prisoners held by the North, and the officers were allowed to keep their swords. The capture of the garrison also netted 13,000 small arms, 200 wagons, and 73 artillery pieces. Shortly after the fall of the town, Lee urgently sent for Jackson to rejoin him at Sharpsburg, Maryland, and Jackson left Major General A. P. Hill behind to finish paroling the defeated Union men. The 12,419 Federal soldiers captured by the Confederate Army in the Battle of Harpers Ferry was the largest number of United States troops to surrender until the fall of Bataan in the Philippines during World War II.

==== Final battles ====
In the final week of June 1863, as part of Lee's advance towards Gettysburg, Pennsylvania for his second invasion of the North, he sent forces to attempt to maneuver Union troops out of Harpers Ferry. The Union forces did not offer much of a fight, and instead withdrew to the protection of the Naval Battery on Maryland Heights. The battery shelled the Rebel forces on Bolivar Heights, in the process damaging civilian homes and disrupting the town of Bolivar.

The last time the Bolivar Heights battlefield saw a military engagement was during Jubal Early's invasion of Maryland in late June and early July 1864. Early attempted to take the guns on Maryland Heights, and sent troops to seize Bolivar Heights and Harpers Ferry as well. Once again, as in the previous year, the Union offers little resistance, instead retreating to the protection of the siege cannons on Maryland Heights, which bombarded and pulverized the Confederates, again creating extensive damage to the town.

=== Campground ===
The easy slopes of Bolivar Heights served well as a military campground. Stonewall Jackson used it as such in Spring 1861, where he drilled the 1st Virginia Brigade, which would later evolve into the Stonewall Brigade. His familiarity with the terrain was valuable later at the Battle of Harpers Ferry.

The largest encampment on Bolivar Heights took place after the crucial Battle of Antietam, in which Union forces under General George B. McClellan held off Lee's invasion of Maryland, forcing him to withdraw back across the Potomac River to Virginia. Almost 15,000 men, the entire 2nd Corps of the Army of the Potomac bivouacked there for about six weeks. They constructed extensive earthworks along the length of the ridge to improve the defenses of the heights, which, because it is lower than either Maryland Heights or Loudoun Heights, is a preferred approach to the area from the Shenandoah Valley. During the encampment, Thaddeus Lowe used a gas-filled balloon to observe the movements of the Rebel forces in the valley. The camp broke in the first week of November 1862 as the troops deployed to take part in the Fredericksburg Campaign.

=== Corral and wagon yard ===
During Union Major General Phillip H. Sheridan's Shanendoah Valley Campaign of 1864, Bolivar Heights served as the largest corral and wagon yard in the valley, temporarily hosting thousands of mules and hundreds of quartermaster wagon, which would be used to carry munitions and other supplies south.

=== Graveyard ===
Hundreds of Union soldiers who died at Harpers Ferry from disease were buried on Bolivar Heights. Their remains were later dug up and transferred to the Antietam National Cemetery outside of Sharpsburg, Maryland.
