= John Brown Bell =

Historic bell on display in Marlborough, Massachusetts, U.S.

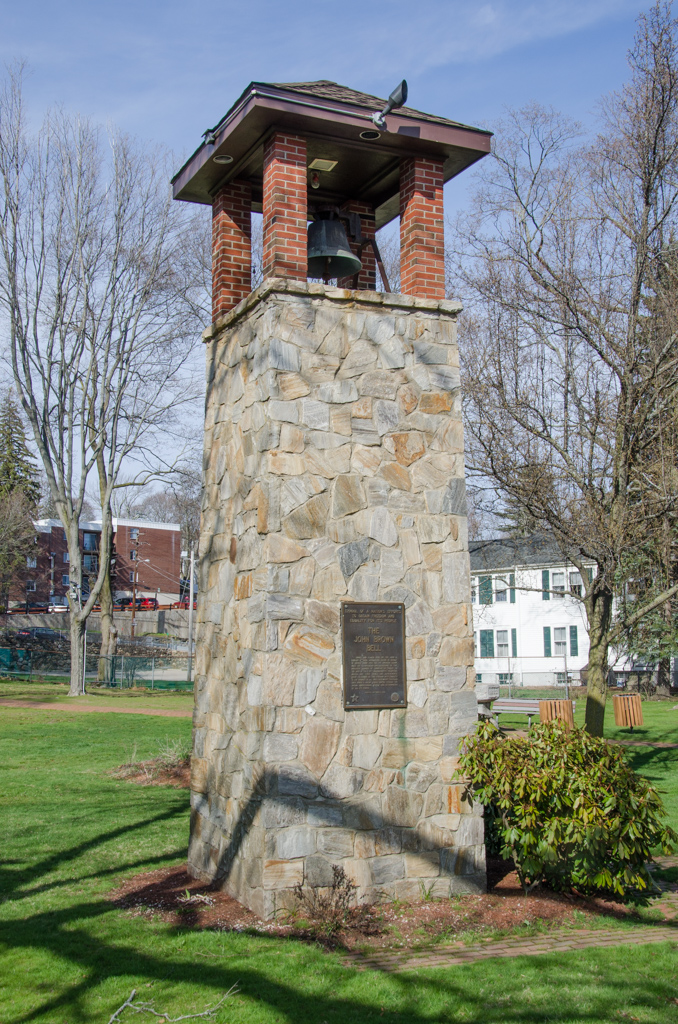
- The bell on display in Marlborough, Massachusetts
- Interactive map of John Brown Bell
- Location: Union Common, Main Street, Marlborough, Massachusetts, U.S.
- Coordinates: 42°20′51″N 71°32′44″W
- Width: 24 inches (61 cm) (diameter)
- Height: 20 inches (51 cm)
- Weight: 700–800 lb (320–360 kg)
- Dedicated date: March 28, 1893; 133 years ago (at first location in Marlborough); September 2, 1968; 57 years ago (at extant tower)
- Dedicated to: Company I of the 13th Massachusetts Volunteer Militia (per plaque on base of the tower)
- Namesake: John Brown

The John Brown Bell is a distinguished American Civil War-era bell tower that has been called the "second-most important bell in American history", after the Liberty Bell. In 1861, the bell was removed from Harpers Ferry, then part of Virginia, by Union army soldiers from Marlborough, Massachusetts, who left it with a resident of Williamsport, Maryland. In 1892, the bell was moved from Williamsport to Marlborough, where it remains.

== History ==
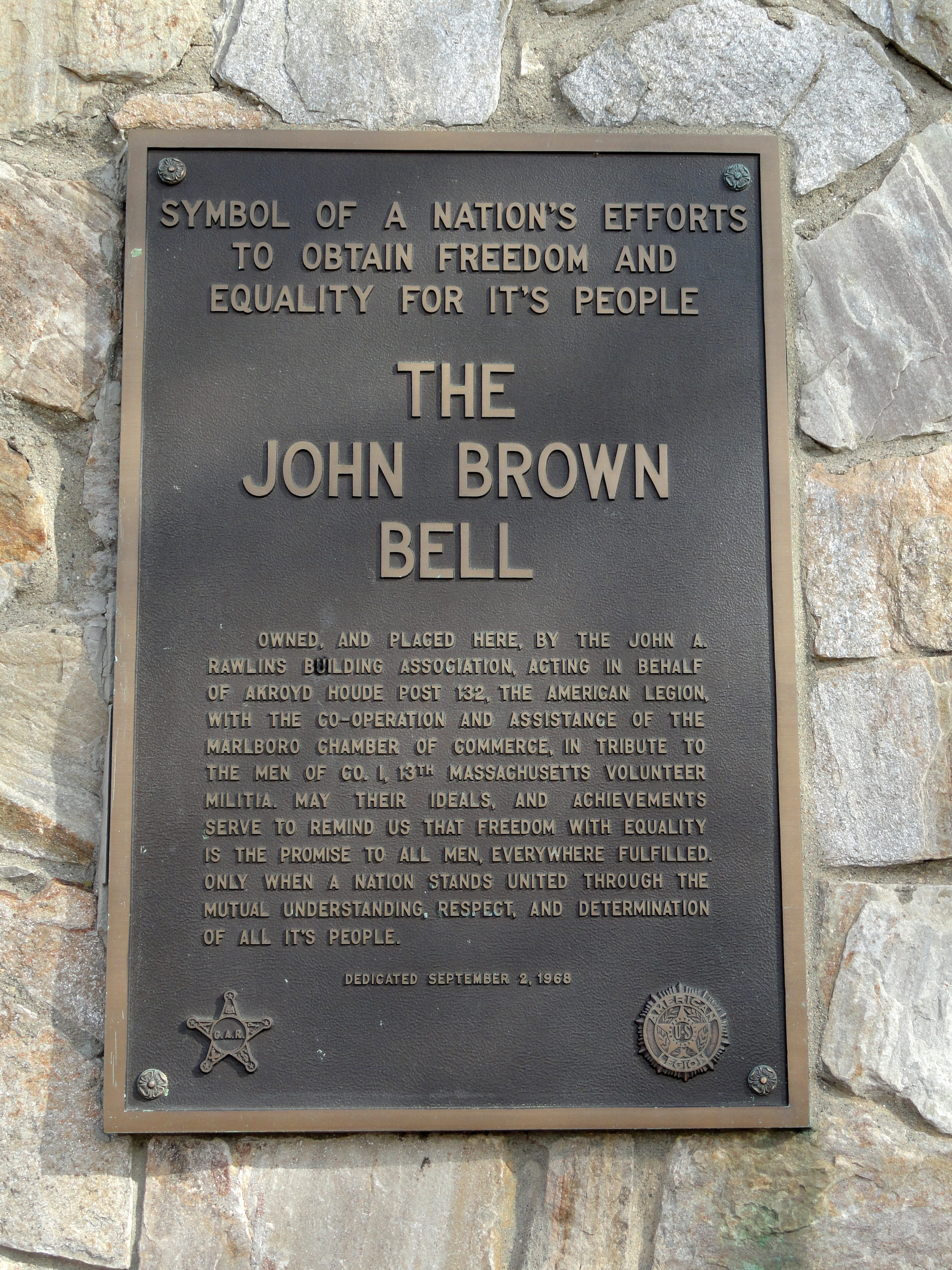
Plaque on the bell tower

From 1800 until the Civil War, the bell was located in Harpers Ferry, then part of Virginia. In October 1859, abolitionist John Brown led a raid on the Harpers Ferry Armory. The raid ended when marines under the command of Lt. Col. Robert E. Lee (then with the United States Army) stormed the building. Brown and six of his men were later hanged for murder and treason.

In August 1861, Company I of the 13th Massachusetts Infantry Regiment was on patrol in Harpers Ferry, and found the fire engine house (now known as John Brown's Fort) where John Brown's raid ended in October 1859. The bell was still in place, and knowing the hook and ladder company in their hometown of Marlborough, Massachusetts, needed a bell (many of them were firemen), they decided to take it. Other accounts state the men were ordered to seize anything of value to the U.S. government to prevent it from falling into the hands of Lee's Confederate Army. The soldiers removed the 700-to-800-pound (320 to 360 kg) bell, brought it with them to their next encampment in Williamsport, Maryland, and got permission from the War Department to keep it.

While stationed in Williamsport, Company I became friends with Elizabeth Ensminger who supplied them with bread. When the company was ordered to Virginia, they entrusted Elizabeth with the bell. Approximately 30 years later, in September 1892, six of the original 15 soldiers returned to Williamsport to see Elizabeth (then Snyder). They discovered that she had hung the bell in her back yard, and rang it on special occasions. Another account states that the bell had remained buried.

The men raised money to bring the bell to Marlborough, where it was hung outside the city's Grand Army of the Republic (GAR) building, dedicated on March 28, 1893. On June 17, 1903, both the John Brown Bell and the Liberty Bell, on loan from Marlborough and Philadelphia, respectively, were featured in Bunker Hill Day festivities in Charlestown, Boston.

The bell remained on display, hanging outside Marlborough's GAR building, until at least 1956. Since 1968, the bell has been located in Union Common, a park in the downtown area, and is hung in a tower that was built to house it. As the GAR was dissolved in 1956, ownership of the bell now lies with Marlborough's American Legion post.

== Controversy over ownership ==
Over the years, citizens of Harpers Ferry have tried in vain to have the bell returned, potentially to be exhibited atop the reconstructed firehouse where John Brown was captured. "In the past, several mayors have tried to have it returned, but basically it's difficult to do. I suppose it requires a lot of energy that, frankly, no one has," James A. Addy, mayor of the Appalachian town of 310 that is about 60 miles (97 km) from Washington, D.C., said. "I believe the bell is wired with an alarm, so it can't be surreptitiously taken, like at night."

"Oh, they've wanted it back," said Joan Abshire, a member of the Marlborough Historical Society who compiled a comprehensive study of the bell. "When I went down there (for research), they always said, 'Well, where's the bell?' The men from Marlborough saved it from obliteration, claimed Gary Brown, chairman of the city's Historical Commission, "Had they not taken the bell, it wouldn't exist. Virtually every bell in the South was melted down for munitions."
