= John C. Caldwell =

American Civil War general and diplomat (1833–1912)

John Curtis Caldwell
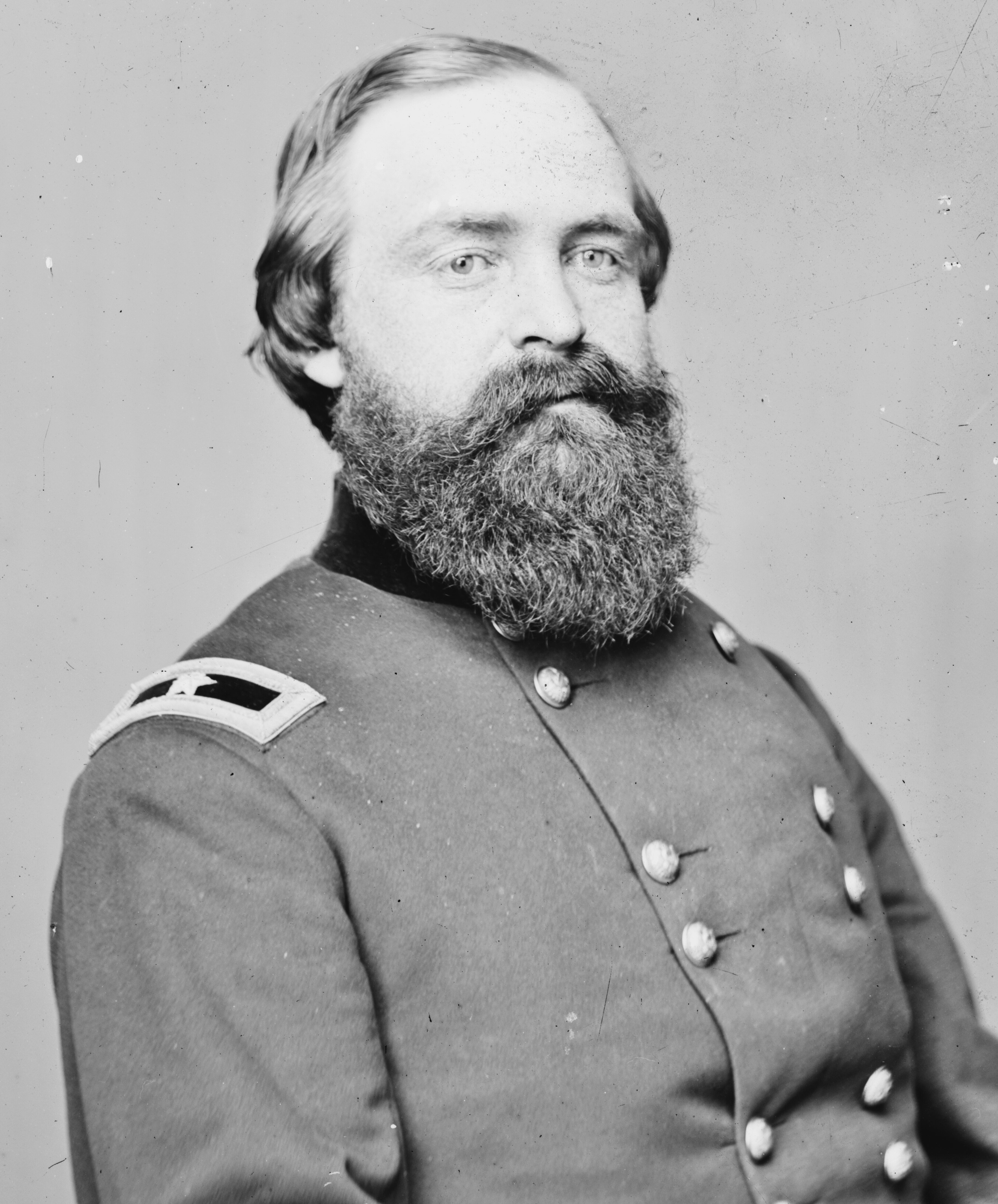
- Born: April 17, 1833; Lowell, Vermont
- Died: August 31, 1912 (aged 79); Calais, Maine
- Burial place: St. Stephen Rural Cemetery, St. Stephen, New Brunswick, Canada
- Military career
- Allegiance: United States of America; Union
- Branch: United States Army; Union Army
- Service years: 1861–1866
- Rank: Brigadier General; Brevet Major General
- Commands: 11th Maine Volunteer Infantry Regiment; 1st Brigade, 1st Division,II Corps; 1st Division, II Corps; II Corps
- Conflicts: American Civil War; Battle of Glendale; Battle of Antietam; Battle of Fredericksburg; Battle of Chancellorsville; Battle of Gettysburg; Battle of Morton's Ford
- Other work: Lawyer, Diplomat

John Curtis Caldwell (April 17, 1833 – August 31, 1912) was a teacher, a Union general in the American Civil War, and an American diplomat.

== Early life ==
Caldwell was born in Lowell, Vermont. He graduated from Amherst College in 1855 and moved to Maine, where he was the principal of the Washington Academy in East Machias.

== Civil War ==
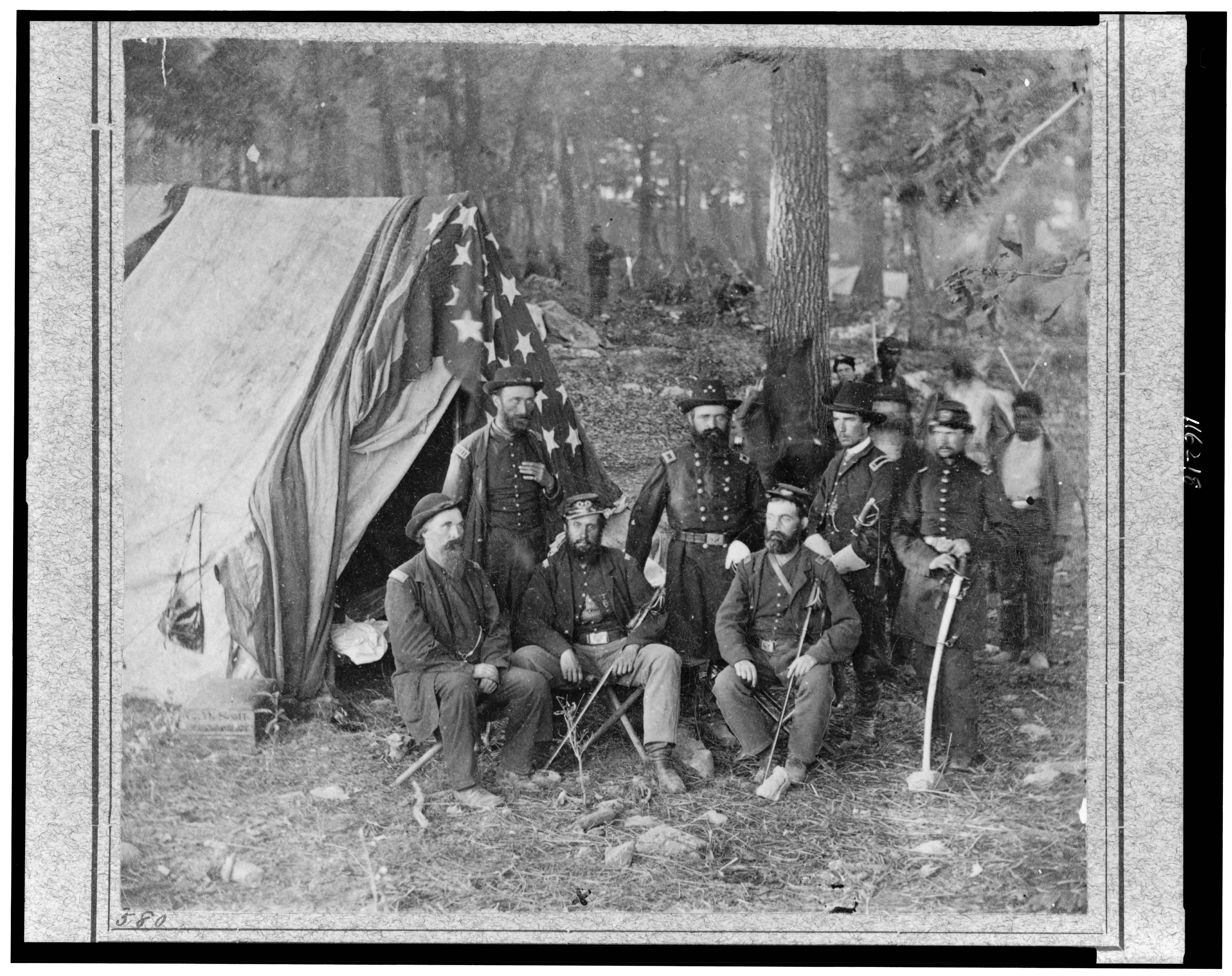
Bv't. Maj. Gen. John C. Caldwell and staff posed in front of tent

At the beginning of the Civil War, Caldwell was 28 years old and had no military experience. However, his bearing as an academic principal seems to have impressed others because he was elected colonel of the 11th Maine Infantry regiment on November 12, 1861. Early in the Peninsula Campaign (April 28, 1862), he was promoted to brigadier general and assumed command of the 1st Brigade of the 1st Division of II Corps of the Army of the Potomac after the brigade commander, Brigadier General Oliver O. Howard, was wounded at the Battle of Seven Pines. At the Battle of Glendale, he displayed "personal gallantry" in coming to the aid of the beleaguered Union division led by Philip Kearny.

At the Battle of Antietam, on September 17, 1862, he briefly led his division when its commander, Major General Israel B. Richardson, was wounded. Caldwell himself was wounded in the battle and he received criticism that he handled his brigade poorly in the assault on the sunken road in the center of the Confederate line (the sunken road, or "Bloody Lane"). There were also rumors spread that he had hidden in the rear to avoid direct contact with the enemy. He was wounded again, twice, at the Battle of Fredericksburg that December, while preparing his brigade to assault the stone wall on Marye's Heights; one of his regiments broke and ran during the assault, further tarnishing his reputation. At the Battle of Chancellorsville the following May, his brigade performed well under difficult circumstances, covering the retreat of the army from the crossroads at the Chancellor House.

Caldwell's bloodiest combat experience was at the Battle of Gettysburg on July 2, 1863. Since May 22, he had commanded the 1st Division of the II Corps, now under Maj. Gen. Winfield S. Hancock. He and his division arrived at the battlefield on the morning of July 2 and took up a reserve position on Cemetery Ridge. That afternoon, as the powerful Confederate assault from the corps of Lt. Gen. James Longstreet, struck the Union III Corps, Hancock ordered Caldwell's division to reinforce the III Corps in the Wheatfield. Caldwell got his division moving quickly and conducted the largest Union assault of the three-day battle. However, due to a lack of adequate command on that portion of the battlefield, Caldwell's division was hit in its exposed right flank by the Confederate division of Maj. Gen. Lafayette McLaws, causing great confusion and a general retreat back across the Wheatfield.

Caldwell received criticism from Maj. Gen. George Sykes, the commander of the Union V Corps, who was operating nearby. General Hancock subsequently lost confidence in Caldwell and his staff conducted an investigation to determine whether Caldwell led his division properly. He was exonerated from any blame, but his reputation in the Army of the Potomac was damaged. A recent writer on Gettysburg has blamed Sykes for giving sketchy instructions to Caldwell. In March 1864, the army was reorganized and reduced from five corps to three. Caldwell was transferred to Washington and assigned to the Adjutant General legal office at the Department of War and saw no further combat service.

== Postbellum ==
In March 1865, General Caldwell attended the Second Inaugural Address of President Lincoln representing the Governor of Maine and was a VIP listed on the Lincoln Inauguration Program kept at the Library of Congress. After President Lincoln died, he was selected to serve in the honor guard for the funeral train. He received a brevet promotion to Major General on August 19, 1865, and was mustered out of the volunteer service on January 15, 1866. He returned to civilian life as a Lawyer, member of the Maine Legislature, and served as the Adjutant General of the Maine Militia from 1867 to 1869. After President Grant was elected, he was appointed as a diplomatic in the State Department and served as the U.S. Consul in Valparaíso, Chile, from 1869 to 1874; U.S. Minister to Uruguay and Paraguay, 1874 to 1882. He returned to the US and moved to Topeka, KS in 1882 living near his son and was appointed by the Governor to be Director of the Kansas Parole Board for over 15 years. In 1898, he returned to the State Department and served under President Teddy Roosevelt as U.S. Consul to San José, Costa Rica, 1897 to 1909. He retired in 1909 and returned to Topeka, KS.

Over his years in the State Department, Caldwell and his wife kept close ties to Maine often visiting his daughter (Harriet Caldwell Murchie) and her family living in Calais, Maine. His wife died there while visiting in 1911 and was buried in the Murchie Family Cemetery in Canada. He passed away a few months later in 1912 and both were buried with family at the St. Stephen Rural Cemetery in St. Stephen, New Brunswick, Canada. Because of his burial there its noted as the only Civil War General to be buried outside the United States.

More recently in 2025, an ancestor of the Caldwell family located his civil war sword held at the archives of the Kansas State Museum. The State of Maine is currently in the process of requesting his sword be loaned for display in their newly renovated museum in Augusta, Maine. Historical documents containing his papers and personal items are located at Amherst College. ￼

== Gods and Generals ==
Caldwell appears briefly in the film Gods and Generals played by James Garrett. He is commanding his brigade at the assault on Marye's Heights during the Battle of Fredericksburg

== See also ==
- List of American Civil War generals (Union)

== Notes ==
Diplomatic posts
| Preceded by John L. Stevens | United States Minister Resident, Uruguay; July 6, 1870–May 19, 1873 | changed to Chargé d'Affaires |
| Preceded by John L. Stevens | United States Minister Resident, Paraguay; August 26, 1870–May 19, 1873 | changed to Chargé d'Affaires |
| changed from Minister Resident | United States Chargé d'Affaires, Uruguay; August 15, 1876–July 10, 1882 | Succeeded by William Williams |
| changed from Minister Resident | United States Chargé d'Affaires, Paraguay; August 15, 1876–July 10, 1882 | Succeeded by William Williams |
Military offices
| Preceded by Gouverneur K. Warren | Commander of the II Corps; August 26, 1863 – September 2, 1863 | Succeeded by Gouverneur K. Warren |
| Preceded by Gouverneur K. Warren | Commander of the II Corps; October 10, 1863 – October 12, 1863 | Succeeded by Gouverneur K. Warren |
| Preceded by Gouverneur K. Warren | Commander of the II Corps; December 16, 1863 – December 29, 1863 | Succeeded by Gouverneur K. Warren |
| Preceded by Gouverneur K. Warren | Commander of the II Corps; January 9, 1864 – January 15, 1864 | Succeeded by Gouverneur K. Warren |
