= Battle of Bolivar Heights =

1861 American Civil War battle

Coordinates: 39°19′25″N 77°45′41″W

- Part of American Civil War
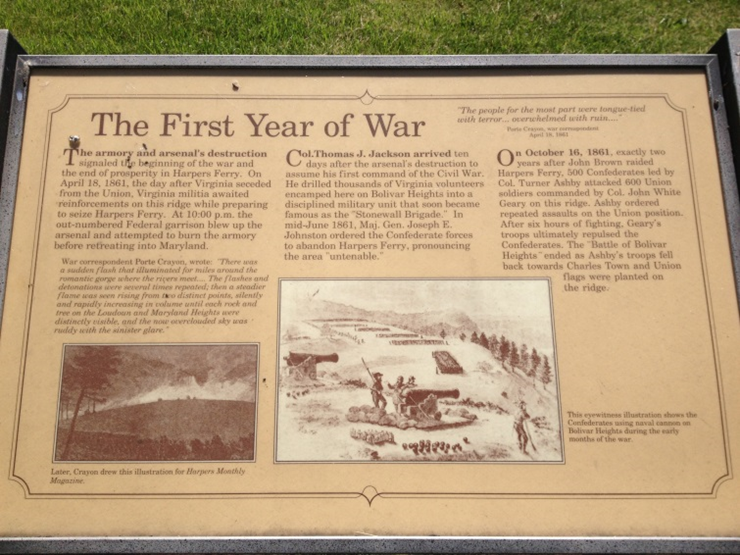
- Bolivar Heights informational sign, information about the battle on the right.
Date	October 16, 1861
Location	Bolivar Heights, Jefferson County, West Virginia
Result	Union victory

Belligerents
United States of America (Union)	Confederate States of America (Confederacy)

Commanders and leaders
John W. Geary	Turner Ashby

Strength
100 troops	app. 700 troops

Casualties and losses
4 dead, 7 wounded, 2 taken prisoner	1 dead, 9 wounded

The Battle of Bolivar Heights (October 16, 1861) was an early battle of the American Civil War. Bolivar Heights is a plateau which overlooks the towns of Harpers Ferry, West Virginia and Bolivar, West Virginia, then part of Virginia.

== Battle ==
On October 15, 1861, Union Major General Nathaniel P. Banks ordered Colonel John White Geary to cross the Potomac River from Maryland Heights, part of Elk Ridge (Maryland) and capture wheat stored by the Confederate States Army near Bolivar Heights. Geary crossed the river with 600 men but sent 500 of them back that night. On October 16, a Confederate force of 300 militia men armed with obsolete flintlock muskets, 2 companies of regular Confederate infantrymen and 230 cavalrymen under Colonel Turner Ashby attacked Geary's force, drove them back to Bolivar and nearly surrounded them. The Union force then flanked the inexperienced Confederates and in turn forced them to withdraw. The Union troops captured a Confederate 24-pound cannon that had broken down during the fight. Ashby claimed that he had withdrawn in the face of heavy Union reinforcements after holding his position for four hours. Geary greatly exaggerated the size of the Confederate force (3,000) and the number of casualties his men inflicted on them (about 150). In turn, Ashby exaggerated the Union dead, stating that his men had killed 25 Union soldiers.

Ashby reported that he lost one dead and nine wounded. Geary reported his losses at four dead, seven wounded and two taken prisoner. Geary himself was one of the wounded, having been cut to the bone below the knee by a shell fragment. He stayed on the field despite the wound, from which he recovered quickly.
