= II Corps (Union army) =

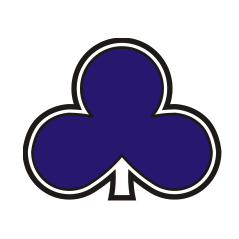
- Army of the Potomac II Corps badge (trefoil)
- Active: 1862–1865
- Country: United States of America
- Branch: Union Army
- Type: Army Corps
- Size: Corps
- Part of: Army of the Potomac
- Motto: "Clubs are trumps"
- Engagements: American Civil War

Commanders
- Notable commanders: Edwin Vose Sumner; Darius N. Couch; Winfield Scott Hancock; Gouverneur K. Warren; Andrew A. Humphreys

Insignia
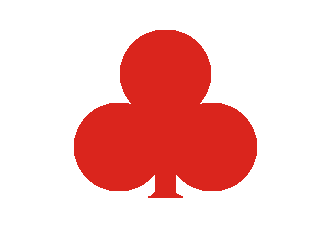
- 1st Division

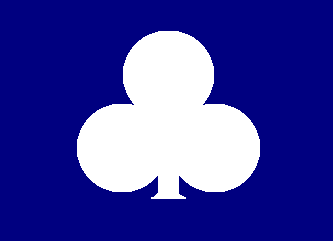
- 2nd Division

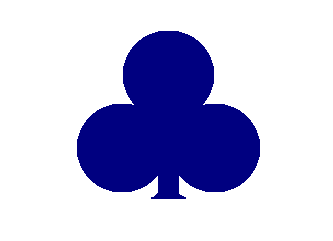
- 3rd Division

There were five corps in the Union Army designated as II Corps (Second Army Corps) during the American Civil War. These formations were the Army of the Cumberland II Corps commanded by Thomas L. Crittenden from October 24, 1862, to November 5, 1862, later renumbered XXI Corps; the Army of the Mississippi II corps led by William T. Sherman from January 4, 1863, to January 12, 1863, renumbered XV Corps; Army of the Ohio II Corps commanded by Thomas L. Crittenden from September 29, 1862, to October 24, 1862, transferred to Army of the Cumberland; Army of Virginia II Corps led by Nathaniel P. Banks from June 26, 1862, to September 4, 1862, and Alpheus S. Williams from September 4, 1862, to September 12, 1862, renumbered XII Corps; and the Army of the Potomac II Corps from March 13, 1862, to June 28, 1865.

Of these five, the one most widely known was the Army of the Potomac formation, the subject of this article.

== Corps history ==
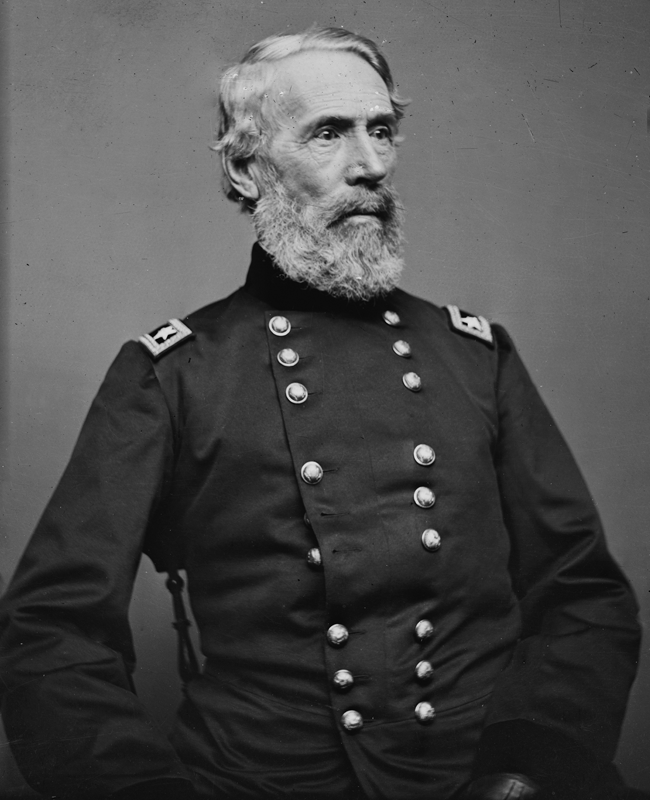
Maj. Gen. Edwin V. Sumner

The II Corps was prominent by reason of its longer and continuous service, larger organization, hardest fighting, and greatest number of casualties. Within its ranks was the regiment that sustained the largest percentage of loss in any one action; the regiment that sustained the greatest numerical loss in any one action; and the regiment that sustained the greatest numerical loss during its term of service. Of the one hundred regiments in the Union Army that lost the most men in battle, thirty-five of them belonged to the II Corps. The II Corps also fought in nearly every battle in the main Eastern Theater, from the 1862 Peninsula Campaign to the Confederate surrender at Appomattox Court House.

The corps was organized under General Orders No. 101, March 21, 1862, which assigned Brigadier General Edwin Vose Sumner to its command, and Brigadier Generals Israel B. Richardson, John Sedgwick, and Louis Blenker to the command of its divisions. Within three weeks of its organization the corps moved with George B. McClellan's Army of the Potomac on the Peninsula Campaign, except for Blenker's division, which was withdrawn on March 31 from McClellan's command, and ordered to reinforce John C. Frémont's army in western Virginia. Blenker's division never rejoined the corps. The remaining two divisions numbered 21,500 men, of whom 18,000 were present for duty.

The first general engagement of the corps occurred at the Battle of Seven Pines, where Sumner's prompt and soldierly action brought the corps on the field in time to retrieve a serious disaster, and change a rout into a victory. In a fierce engagement with Confederate general Gustavus W. Smith's division, Brig. Gen Oliver Howard was shot in the arm and had to have it amputated, causing him to miss all of the summer campaigning of the army. The casualties of the two divisions in that battle amounted to 196 killed, 899 wounded, and 90 missing. In the Seven Days Battles, the II Corps was not engaged until Savage's Station when it held off Confederate general John B. Magruder's troops. The following day, the corps was engaged at Glendale, where John Sedgwick's division was in the thick of the fighting. Israel Richardson's division spent the battle to the north engaged in a standoff with "Stonewall" Jackson's troops on opposite sides of White Oak Swamp; fighting here was limited to artillery dueling. The corps was held in reserve at Malvern Hill. Total II Corps casualties in the Seven Days were 201 killed, 1,195 wounded, and 1,024 missing. Afterwards, Sumner, Sedgwick, and Richardson all received promotions to major general as part of a blanket promotion of each corps and division commander in the Army of the Potomac. The II Corps spent the Northern Virginia Campaign in Washington, D.C., and did not participate in it except at the very end when it moved out to cover the retreat of Maj. Gen John Pope's army.

The corps then marched on the Maryland Campaign, during which time it received a new division of nine month troops headed by Brig. Gen William H. French. At the Battle of Antietam the corps was heavily engaged, its casualties amounting to more than twice that of any other corps on the field. Out of 15,000 effectives, it lost 883 killed, 3,859 wounded, and 396 missing; total, 5,138. Nearly one-half of these casualties occurred in Sedgwick's 2nd Division, in its bloody and ill-planned advance on the Dunker church, an affair that was under Sumner's personal direction; this included units like the 34th New York Volunteer Infantry Regiment on the left flank of the division's 1st Brigade, as well as the 1st Minnesota Volunteer Infantry of later Gettysburg fame. The Irish Brigade, of Richardson's 1st Division, also sustained a terrible loss in its fight at the "Bloody Lane", but, at the same time, inflicted a greater one on the enemy. This allowed Colonel Francis C. Barlow to lead the 61st and 64th New York Volunteer Infantry Regiments to break through the Confederate line. Sedgwick and Richardson were both wounded in the battle; the former eventually recovered and went on to corps command, the latter succumbed to an infection a month and a half after the battle. Oliver Howard succeeded to command of Sedgwick's division, Richardson's division was taken over by Brig. Gen Winfield Hancock, brought over from the VI Corps as the ranking brigadier general in the division, John C. Caldwell, was too inexperienced and junior for the position.

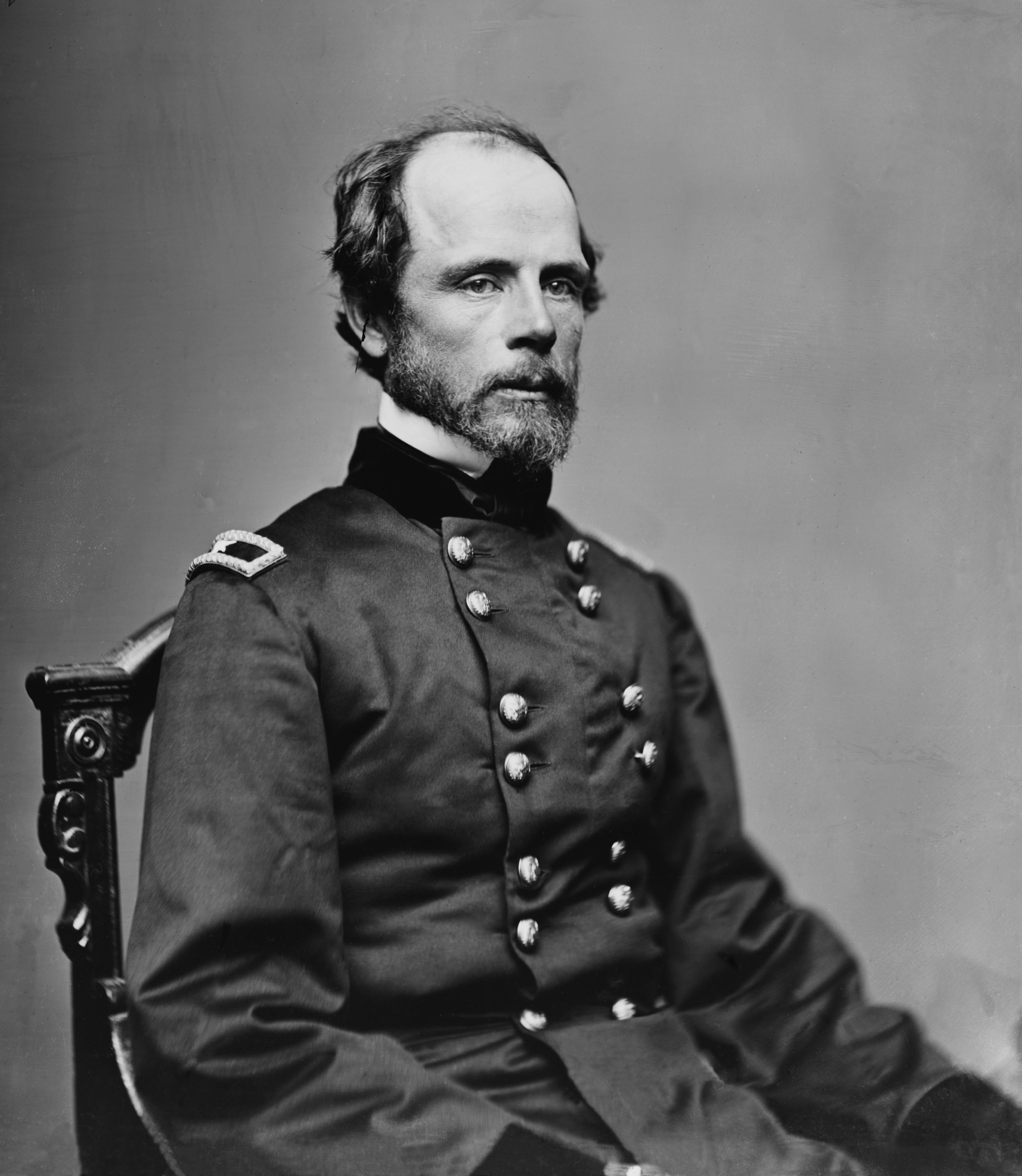
Maj. Gen. Darius N. Couch

The next engagement was at the Battle of Fredericksburg. In the meantime Sumner had been promoted to the command of a Grand Division—II and IX Corps—and General Darius N. Couch, a division commander of the IV Corps, was appointed to his place. The loss of the corps at Fredericksburg exceeded that of any other in that battle, amounting to 412 killed, 3,214 wounded, and 488 missing, one-half of which fell on Hancock's Division in the unsuccessful assault on Marye's Heights. The percentage of loss in Hancock's division was high, Caldwell's brigade suffering 46% casualties.

After Fredericksburg, the Grand Divisions were discontinued and the aging Sumner decided to retire from command. Couch led the corps at the Battle of Chancellorsville, with Hancock, John Gibbon, and French as his division commanders. Sedgwick had been promoted to the command of the VI Corps, and Howard, who had commanded Sedgwick's Division at Fredericksburg, was promoted to the command of the XI Corps. At Chancellorsville, the principal part of the II Corps's fighting fell on Hancock's division, its skirmish line, under Colonel Nelson A. Miles, distinguishing itself by a successful resistance to a strong attack of the enemy, making one of the most interesting episodes in the history of that battle. During the fighting at Chancellorsville, Gibbon's 2nd Division remained at Fredericksburg, where it supported Sedgwick's operations, but with slight loss.

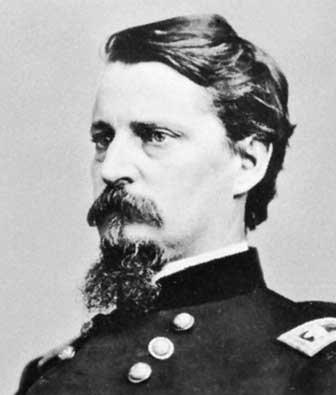
Maj. Gen. Winfield S. Hancock

Not long after Chancellorsville, Couch, unhappy with Joe Hooker's performance as army commander, resigned. Hancock assumed command of the corps, and Brigadier General John C. Caldwell to his division. At the start of the Gettysburg campaign, Brigadier General Alexander Hays' brigade joined, and was assigned to the 3rd Division, Hays taking command of the division. At the Battle of Gettysburg, the corps was hotly engaged in the battles of the second and third days, encountering there the hardest fighting in its experience, and winning there its grandest laurels; on the second day, in the fighting at the Wheatfield, and on the third, in the repulse of Pickett's Charge, which was mostly directed against Hancock's position. The fighting was deadly in the extreme, the percentage of loss in the 1st Minnesota of Gibbon's Division, being almost without an equal in the records of modern warfare. The loss in the corps was 796 killed, 3,186 wounded, and 368 missing; a total of 4,350 out of less than 10,500 engaged. Gibbon's Division suffered the most, the percentage of loss in Brigadier General William Harrow's 1st Brigade being unusually severe. Hancock and Gibbon were seriously wounded, while of the brigade commanders, Samuel K. Zook, Edward E. Cross, George L. Willard, and Eliakim Sherrill were killed. The monthly return of the corps, June 30, 1863, shows an aggregate of 22,336 borne on the rolls, but shows only 13,056 "present for duty." Deducting the latter from the usual proportion of non-combatants—the musicians, teamsters, cooks, servants, and stragglers—and it becomes doubtful if the corps had over 10,000 muskets in line at Gettysburg.

Hancock's wounds necessitated an absence of several months. William Hays was placed in command of the corps immediately after the battle of Gettysburg, retaining the command until August 12, when he was relieved by Major General Gouverneur K. Warren. Warren had distinguished himself at Gettysburg by his quick comprehension of the critical situation at Little Round Top, and by the energetic promptness with which he remedied the difficulty. He had also made a brilliant reputation in the V Corps, and as the chief topographical officer of the Army of the Potomac. He was, subsequently, in command at the Battle of Bristoe Station, a II Corps affair, and one which was noticeable for the dash with which officers and men fought, together with the superior ability displayed by Warren himself. He also commanded at the Battle of Mine Run and Morton's Ford, the divisions at that time being under Generals Caldwell, Alexander S. Webb and Alexander Hays.

Upon the reorganization of the Army of the Potomac, March 23, 1864, the III Corps was discontinued, and two of its three divisions were ordered transferred to the II Corps. Under this arrangement the II Corps was increased to 81 regiments of infantry and 10 batteries of light artillery. The units of the old II Corps were consolidated into two divisions, under Barlow (now a general) and Gibbon; the two divisions of the III Corps were transferred intact, and were numbered as the 3rd and 4th, with Generals David B. Birney and Gershom Mott in command. By this accession, the II Corps attained in April 1864, an aggregate strength of 46,363, with 28,854 present for duty.

Hancock, having partially recovered from his wounds, resumed command, and led his battle-scarred divisions across the Rapidan River. In the Battle of the Wilderness, the corps lost 699 killed, 3,877 wounded, and 516 missing; total, 5,092, half of this loss falling on Birney's 3rd Division. Alexander Hays, commanding the 2nd Brigade of Birney's Division, was among the killed.

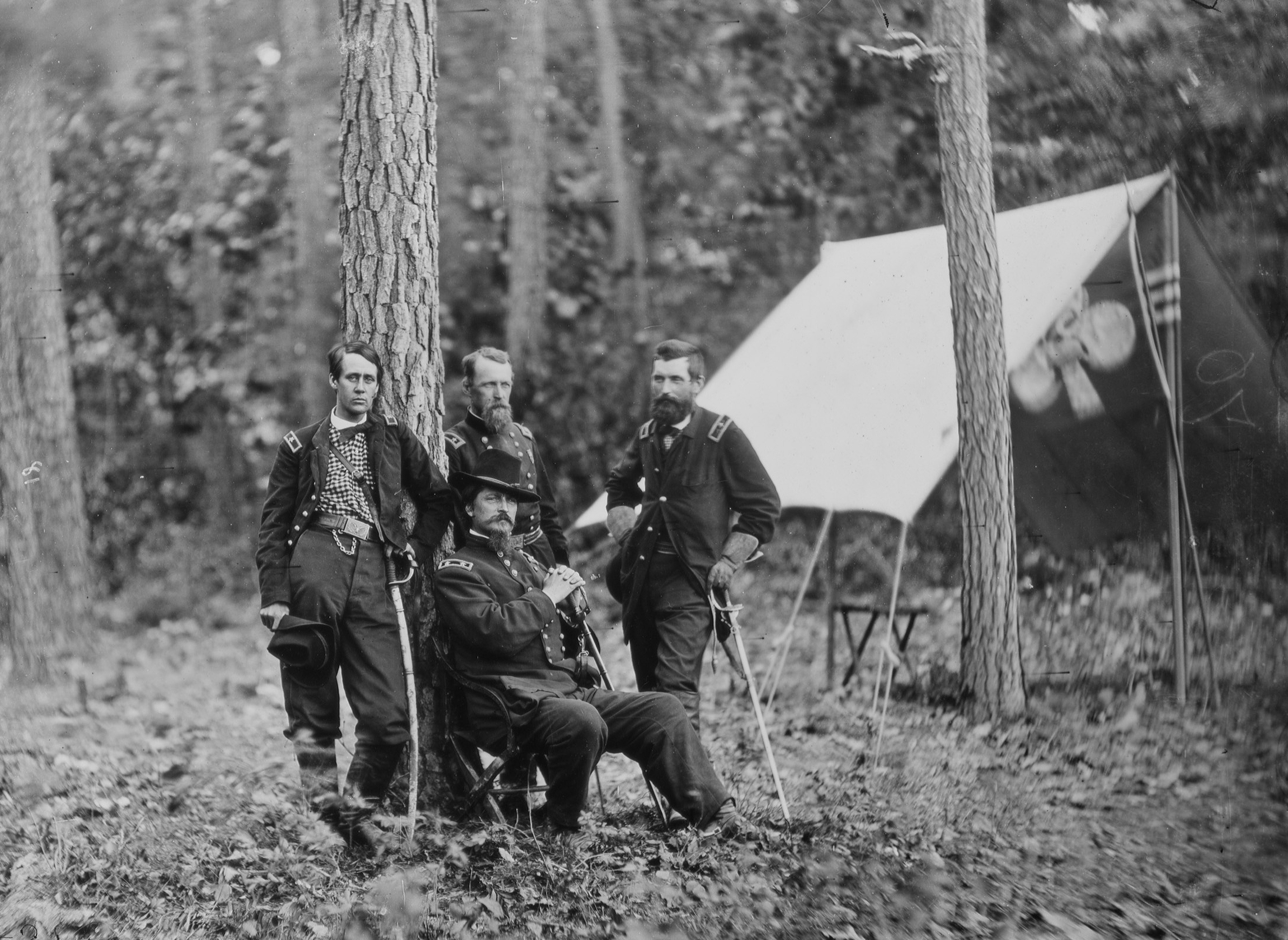
Maj. Gen. Winfield S. Hancock and his II Corps division commanders during the Overland Campaign. Standing, from left to right, are Brig. Gen. Francis C. Barlow, Maj. Gen. David B. Birney, and Brig. Gen. John Gibbon.

At the Battle of Spotsylvania Court House the II Corps again attained a glorious place in history by Hancock's brilliant and successful assault on the morning of May 12. During the fighting around Spotsylvania, Mott's 4th Division became so depleted by casualties, and by the loss of several regiments whose term of service had expired, that it was discontinued and merged into Birney's Division, Mott retaining the command of a brigade. The casualties of the corps in the various actions around Spotsylvania, from May 8 to May 19, aggregated 894 killed, 4,947 wounded, and 801 missing; total 6,642, or over one-third of the loss in the entire Army of the Potomac, including the IX Corps. The heaviest loss occurred in Barlow's 1st Division. Up to this time the II Corps had not lost a color nor a gun, although it had previously captured 44 stands of colors from the enemy.

After more fighting at the Battle of North Anna, and along the Totopotomoy, the corps reached the field where the Battle of Cold Harbor was fought. While at Spotsylvania it had been reinforced by a brigade of heavy artillery regiments, acting as infantry, and by the brigade known as the Corcoran Legion, so that at Cold Harbor it numbered 53,831, present and absent, with 26,900 "present for duty". Its loss at Cold Harbor including eleven days in the trenches, was 494 killed, 2,442 wounded, and 574 missing; total, 3,510. Birney's Division was but slightly engaged.

In the assaults on the Petersburg entrenchments, June 16 – June 18, the Corps is again credited with the largest casualty list. In one of these attacks, the 1st Maine Heavy Artillery sustained the greatest loss of any regimental organization in any one action during the war. At this time the corps contained 85 regiments; its effective strength, however, was less than at a previous date.

By late June 1864, the II Corps's effectiveness as a fighting force had been severely diminished by almost two months of continuous fighting. Of the approximately 30,000 men in the corps at the start of the Overland Campaign, 20,000 of them had been lost since then, for a 68% casualty rate. Over half the brigade commanders the corps had had in April had been killed or wounded since then, and over 100 regimental commanders. With most of the best officers and men gone, the II Corps went from being the Army of the Potomac's elite shock troops to the smallest and weakest corps in the army.

On June 21–23, the II Corps engaged in the Battle of Jerusalem Plank Road where it tried to extend the army's left flank. A.P. Hill's Confederate troops moved down to oppose them, and the II Corps was repulsed. Actual battlefield casualties were light, however 1,700 men were taken prisoner by the Confederates, including several whole regiments, some of them, such as 15th Massachusetts, once elite outfits.

The corps recrossed the James River, and fought at Deep Bottom, July 26, and again on August 14; then, having returned to the lines around Petersburg, Barlow's and Birney's Divisions were engaged at the Second Battle of Ream's Station, on August 25, in which it lost a large number of men captured.

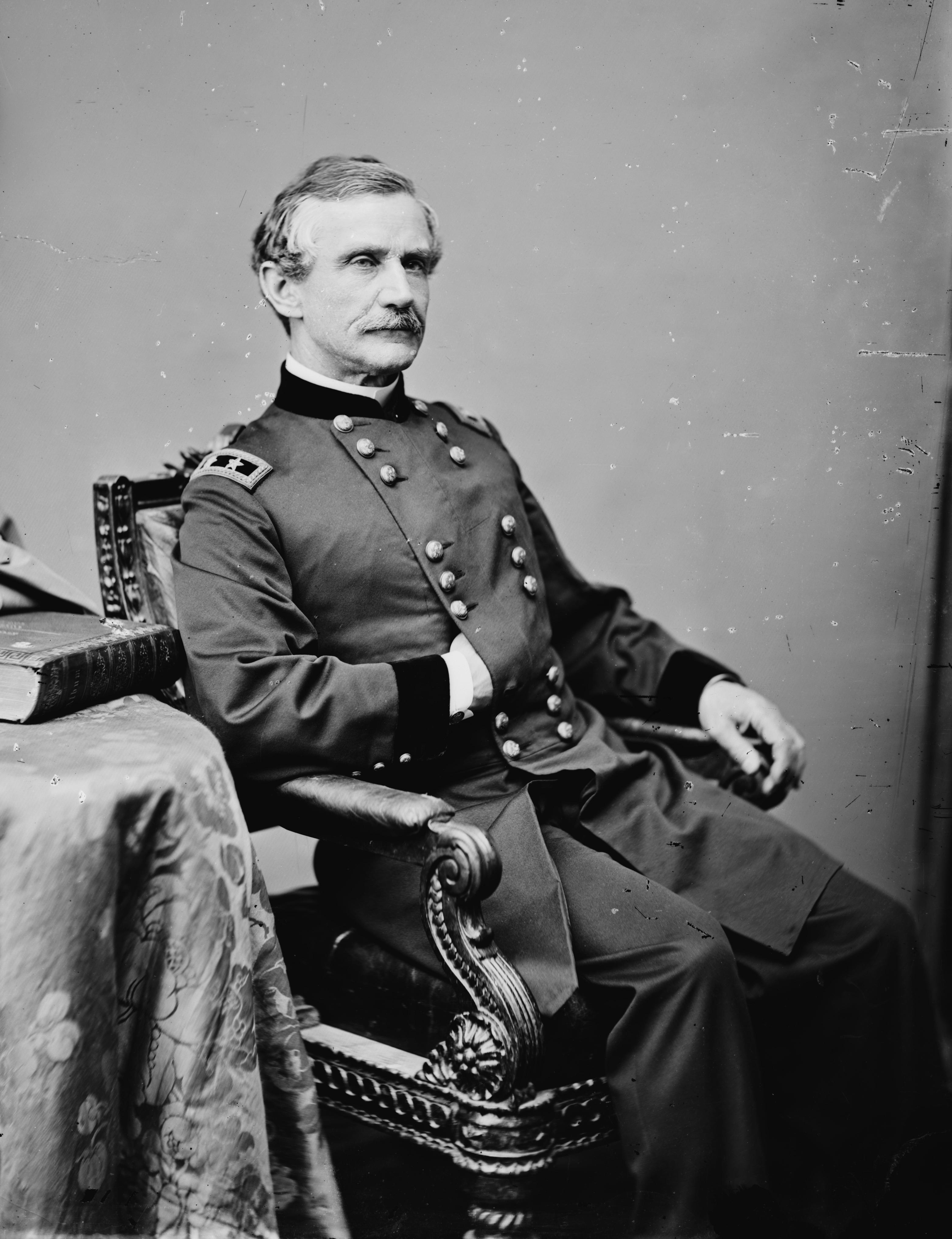
Maj. Gen. Andrew A. Humphreys

At the Battle of Boydton Plank Road, October 27, 1864, the division commanders were Generals Thomas W. Egan and Mott, the 1st Division (Nelson A. Miles's), being retained in the trenches. In November, 1864, Hancock was assigned to other duty, and Major General Andrew A. Humphreys, chief of staff to the Army of the Potomac, succeeded to his position. Humphreys was in command during the final campaign, the divisions being under Generals Miles, William Hays, and Mott. The corps fought its last battle at Farmville on April 7, 1865, two days before Lee's surrender. In this final action Brigadier General Thomas A. Smyth of Hays' 2nd Division, was killed. Smyth was an officer with a brilliant reputation, and at one time commanded the famous Irish Brigade.

Recent scholarship notes the quality not just of II Corps' leadership but its individual soldiers, addressing both individual bravery and deep commitment to the Union as depicted in letters and diaries. In spite of homesickness and coming from Democratic homes and ethnic communities which did not favor expanding war aims to emancipation, soldiers of II Corps saw the fighting through, re-enlisting in 1863-4 and voting overwhelmingly for Abraham Lincoln in 1864. Pride in unit featured prominently in post-war reunions, and on the 50th anniversary of Gettysburg Speaker of the House Champ Clark from Missouri referred to soldiers of II Corps as "those unconquerable boys in blue". Unit cohesion ultimately overcame racial antipathies, frustrations and hatreds according to this analysis.

== Command history ==
Commander	Dates
Edwin V. Sumner	March 13, 1862 – October 7, 1862
Darius N. Couch	October 7, 1862 – December 26, 1862
John Sedgwick	December 26, 1862 – January 26, 1863
Oliver O. Howard	January 26, 1863 – February 5, 1863
Darius N. Couch	February 5, 1863 – May 22, 1863
Winfield S. Hancock	May 22, 1863 – July 1, 1863
John Gibbon	July 1, 1863 – July 2, 1863
Winfield S. Hancock	July 2, 1863 – July 3, 1863
William Hays	July 3, 1863 – August 16, 1863
Gouverneur K. Warren	August 16, 1863 – August 26, 1863
John C. Caldwell	August 26, 1863 – September 2, 1863
Gouverneur K. Warren	September 2, 1863 – October 10, 1863
John C. Caldwell	October 10, 1863 – October 12, 1863
Gouverneur K. Warren	October 12, 1863 – December 16, 1863
John C. Caldwell	December 16, 1863 – December 29, 1863
Gouverneur K. Warren	December 29, 1863 – January 9, 1864
John C. Caldwell	January 9, 1864 – January 15, 1864
Gouverneur K. Warren	January 15, 1864 – March 24, 1864
Winfield S. Hancock	March 24, 1864 – June 18, 1864
David B. Birney	June 18, 1864 – June 27, 1864
Winfield S. Hancock	June 27, 1864 – November 26, 1864
Andrew A. Humphreys	November 26, 1864 – February 15, 1865
Gershom Mott	February 15, 1865 – February 17, 1865
Nelson A. Miles	February 17, 1865 – February 25, 1865
Andrew A. Humphreys	February 25, 1865 – April 22, 1865
Francis C. Barlow	April 22, 1865 – May 5, 1865
Andrew A. Humphreys	May 5, 1865 – June 9, 1865
Gershom Mott	June 9, 1865 – June 20, 1865
Andrew A. Humphreys	June 20, 1865 – June 28, 1865
