= John G. B. Adams =

Union Army Medal of Honor recipient (1841–1900)

John Gregory Bishop Adams
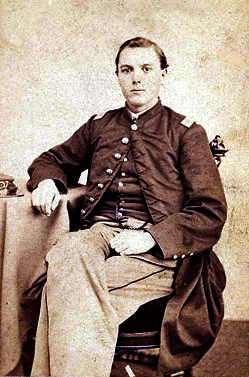
- John Gregory Bishop Adams
- Born: October 6, 1841; Groveland, Massachusetts, U.S.
- Died: October 19, 1900 (aged 59)
- Burial place: Pine Grove Cemetery in Lynn, Massachusetts
- Military career
- Allegiance: United States
- Branch: =: United States Army; Union Army
- Service years: 1861–1865
- Rank: Captain
- Unit: 19th Regiment Massachusetts Volunteer Infantry
- Conflicts: Peninsula Campaign; Battle of Antietam; Battle of Fredericksburg; Battle of Chancellorsville; Battle of Gettysburg; Battle of the Wilderness; Battle of Spotsylvania Court House; Battle of Cold Harbor (POW)
- Awards: Medal of Honor

John Gregory Bishop Adams (October 6, 1841 – October 19, 1900) was an American soldier who received the Medal of Honor for his actions during the American Civil War.

Adams was born October 6, 1841, in Groveland, Massachusetts, to Isaac and Margaret Adams. He married Mary E. on April 5, 1866, in Boston. They had two children, but they both died in infancy.

When Adams returned home after the war, he worked a series of jobs, including working for a shoe company, as a customs inspector, postmaster, and deputy warden. He served as a Massachusetts elector in the 1868 presidential election. In 1899, Adams published a war service memoir, Reminiscences of the Nineteenth Massachusetts Regiment.

== Biography ==
Adams enlisted in military service as a private and eventually achieved the rank of captain. During his Civil War service, he fought in several major battles, including Antietam, Fredericksburg, Chancellorsville and Gettysburg. It was during the Battle of Fredericksburg that his actions would earn him the United States military's highest decoration for valor, the Medal of Honor. During the Battle of Cold Harbor, his entire regiment was captured and held as prisoners in a Confederate prison camp, where he was held for nine months.

=== Civil War service ===
Adams enlisted as a private in Major Benjamin Perley Poore's Rifle Battalion, a unit that was later folded into the 19th Massachusetts Infantry Regiment. The 19th Massachusetts was organized at Camp Schouler in Lynnfield, Massachusetts, in April 1861. (Note: The camp was located in fields next to the South Reading Branch of the Eastern Railroad.) The 19th was largely composed of Essex County men. Its core began as three companies of the state militia's 1st Battalion Massachusetts Rifles from Essex County. (Note: The men of this battalion initialloy expected deployment to defend Washington, D., as the 3rd Battalion, based in Worcester County had done so. The 3rd Battalion had already departed, having completed the required quota from Massachusetts under that initial call. The term "rifles" was a designation frequently given to antebellum militia companies which trained in the use of rifled muskets—a relatively new innovation at the time—as opposed to smoothbore muskets. Only minor differences in training and tactics differentiated such units from a typical infantry company of the time. During the 1840s, "rifle" companies were often expected to train and serve as skirmishers in open order; however, by the Civil War, United States army tactics manuals made no distinction between a company of "rifles" and a typical infantry company.) In the camp, Adams and his fellow militia rifleman regiment turned in most of their Windsor, Vermont-produced Model 1841s and received the Model 1856 Enfield Rifle. Also known as "the 2-band Enfield" and "Sergeants' Rifle," it was the rifle that the British army issued to its rifle regiments and to sergeants in its line battalions. (Note: The Federal and state governments in the U.S. (notably Massachusetts) purchased approximately 8,000 P1856 Short Rifles during the Civil War.) A handful of the Model 1841s that were in excellent condition and had been modified to .58 caliber and with rear sights and bayonets were retained, but most of the men received the new rifles and were impressed with them.

Due to a lack of personnel and infrastructure ready when the war began, the federal government left the recruiting, equipping and providing recruits to the states, providing reimbursement from the federal level upon muster into federal service. Since the states were handling the process, existing militia companies, which were building to full strength, followed the existing militia practice of voting in new recruits, making recruitment slower than that of the new volunteer companies in the regiment. The recruiting for the militia companies and new volunteer companies was working slowly when the defeat at Bull Run shook Washington, D.C. In response, on July 22, Lincoln authorized the call-up of 500,000 more three-year enlistments. The next day, the Secretary of War issued a call for all available regiments and detachments to be hurried forward at once.

The salting of the regiment's companies with Salem Zouaves and other veterans of the Eighth injected a new vim and vigor into recruitment and training. The capable veterans brought a renewed sense of purpose and ramped up the training, with all field officers receiving their commissions by August 3 and the last of the staff and line officers on August 22. Despite still lacking its full paper strength, the regiment mustered into Federal service for a three-year enlistment on August 28, 1861, under the command of Colonel Edward Winslow Hincks. (Note: On August 1, the 19th had received Hincks as its colonel and as its lieutenant colonel, Arthur F. Devereux. Both men had prior militia and federal experience. Colonel Hinks, originally from Maine, had moved from Bangor to Boston as a printer in 1849. By 1855, he had been a state legislator and a Boston city councilor. He had affiliated and drilled in the Commonwealth's militia service with the 8th Massachusetts Militia Regiment as one of the regiment's field officers, and commanded the 8th Massachusetts during its three months' service from April to July 1861. Lieutenant Colonel Devereux had also mobilized with Hincks as commander of the regiment's Company J, which had historically been the Salem Light Infantry but Devereux had outfitted and trained as the Salem Zouaves. The same order that assigned Hincks as the colonel, also named the 19th as "the proper rendezvous for all members of the Eighth Regiment desirous of again enlisting in the service of the country.") The plan was to continue recruiting to bring the regiment up to strength in Massachusetts and send the recruits on in groups of drafts. When the 19th departed the state on March 1, 1861, Adams was a corporal in Company A.

Adams saw service in the first year in Maryland and along the Potomac. He was at Ball's Bluff in October 1861. Prior to the Peninsula Campaign, Adams' regiment spent most of their service in counter-insurgency duties where the active minority of secessionists in Maryland supported frequent raids from the Confederacy across the river. With the earlier service of the men in the 8th and the 19th Massachusetts' passage through Baltimore in mind, Adams and his comrades were constantly wary of the secession sentiment. (Note: Of the initial passage through Rockville, Adams wrote, "... I expected to kill a rebel or be a dead Yankee before night. We marched through the town and found it as quiet as a New England village.")

He served with the 19th in the Peninsula Campaign and at the Battle of Antietam. During the seven days' fighting on the Peninsula, he was conspicuous for his bravery, and at its close his gallantry had won for him a Second Lieutenant's commission. While serving as a Second Lieutenant in Company I, he was one of 18 Union soldiers who received the Medal of Honor for valor at the Battle of Fredericksburg. Adams recovered the regimental and national colors as a corporal and a lieutenant carrying them fell mortally wounded. With a flag in each hand he advanced, and the regiment was reformed on him. He was one of seven soldiers from the 19th Regiment who received the Medal of Honor during the war.

Later, he was fighting at the Battle of Chancellorsville and the Battle of Gettysburg, where he was severely wounded on July 2, 1863; in this battle Adams was the ranking First Lieutenant in his regiment and took command of Company I. After Gettysburg he was promoted captain, and during the Wilderness campaign of 1864 he served with distinguished bravery. His convalescence was relatively brief, and he was able to return and fight at Battle of the Wilderness, Battle of Spotsylvania Court House, and the Battle of Cold Harbor. He and the entire regiment were captured near Petersburg on June 22, 1864, part of the operations against the Jerusalem Plank Road, and Adams was held at Libby Prison in Richmond, Virginia. He was also imprisoned at Macon, Georgia, and Charleston, South Carolina, where he and other officers were placed on Morris Island in an attempt to stop naval bombardment by the Union. Moved to Columbia, he and a comrade attempted to escape but were eventually captured. He was held for a total of nine months. His war experiences form the main story of a fiction work on Apple Books, Honor Comes A Pilgrim Gray, by William Wister.

== Postwar life ==
After the war, Adams was a foreman for ten years at the B. F. Doak & Company shoe factory in Lynn, Massachusetts. He left that post to become an inspector in the Boston Custom House and later served as the Postmaster of Lynn and Deputy Warden of the State Reformatory at Concord. He served as an elector for the state in the 1868 presidential election. In 1885, he was elected Sergeant at Arms for the Massachusetts legislature, overseeing a staff of approximately forty and earning a salary of $3,000.

Adams was a Freemason as a member of Columbian Lodge A.F.&A.M. in Boston, and a member of the Grand Army of the Republic. He joined the G.A.R. as the first member of General Frederick W. Lander Post No. 5 in Lynn, his local post. He served as a delegate to the national G.A.R. convention twelve times and served a year as Department Commander before being elected as Commander-in-Chief in 1893. At the time he was elected, he had been President of the Association of the Survivors of Rebel Prisons for seven years. He was also a member of the Massachusetts Commandery of the Military Order of the Loyal Legion of the United States.

In 1899, he published a memoir of his war service, Reminiscences of the Nineteenth Massachusetts Regiment. He died October 19, 1900, and is buried in Pine Grove Cemetery in Lynn, Massachusetts.

== Medal of Honor citation ==
Rank and organization: Second Lieutenant, Company I, 19th Massachusetts Infantry. Place and date: At Fredericksburg, Va., December 13, 1862. Birth: Groveland, Mass. Date of issue: October 19, 1900.

Citation:

Seized the 2 colors from the hands of a corporal and a lieutenant as they fell mortally wounded, and with a color in each hand advanced across the field to a point where the regiment was reformed on those colors.

== See also ==
- List of Medal of Honor recipients
- List of American Civil War Medal of Honor recipients: A–F
- G.A.R. Hall and Museum in Lynn, Massachusetts
