= 19th Massachusetts Infantry Regiment =

19th Regiment Massachusetts Volunteer Infantry
- Active: August 28, 1861 – July 22, 1865
- Country: United States
- Allegiance: Union
- Branch: Infantry
- Equipment: Model 1841 Mississippi rifles., Springfield Model 1855; Springfield Model 1861 (Note: As seen in surveys before Fredericksburg and Chancellorsville.)
- Engagements: Siege of Yorktown; Battle of Seven Pines; Seven Days Battles; Battle of White Oak Swamp; Battle of Antietam; Battle of Fredericksburg; Battle of Chancellorsville; Battle of Gettysburg; Bristoe Campaign; Mine Run Campaign; Battle of the Wilderness; Battle of Spotsylvania Court House; Battle of Totopotomoy Creek; Battle of Cold Harbor; Siege of Petersburg; First Battle of Deep Bottom; Second Battle of Deep Bottom; Second Battle of Ream's Station; Battle of Boydton Plank Road; Appomattox Campaign; Battle of Sutherland's Station; Battle of Sailor's Creek; Battle of Appomattox Court House

Commanders
- Colonel: Edward Winslow Hincks
- Colonel: Arthur F. Devereux
- Lieutenant Colonel: Ansel Dyer Wass
- Lieutenant Colonel: Edmund Rice

Insignia
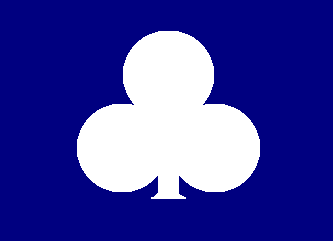
- II Corps (2nd Division) badge

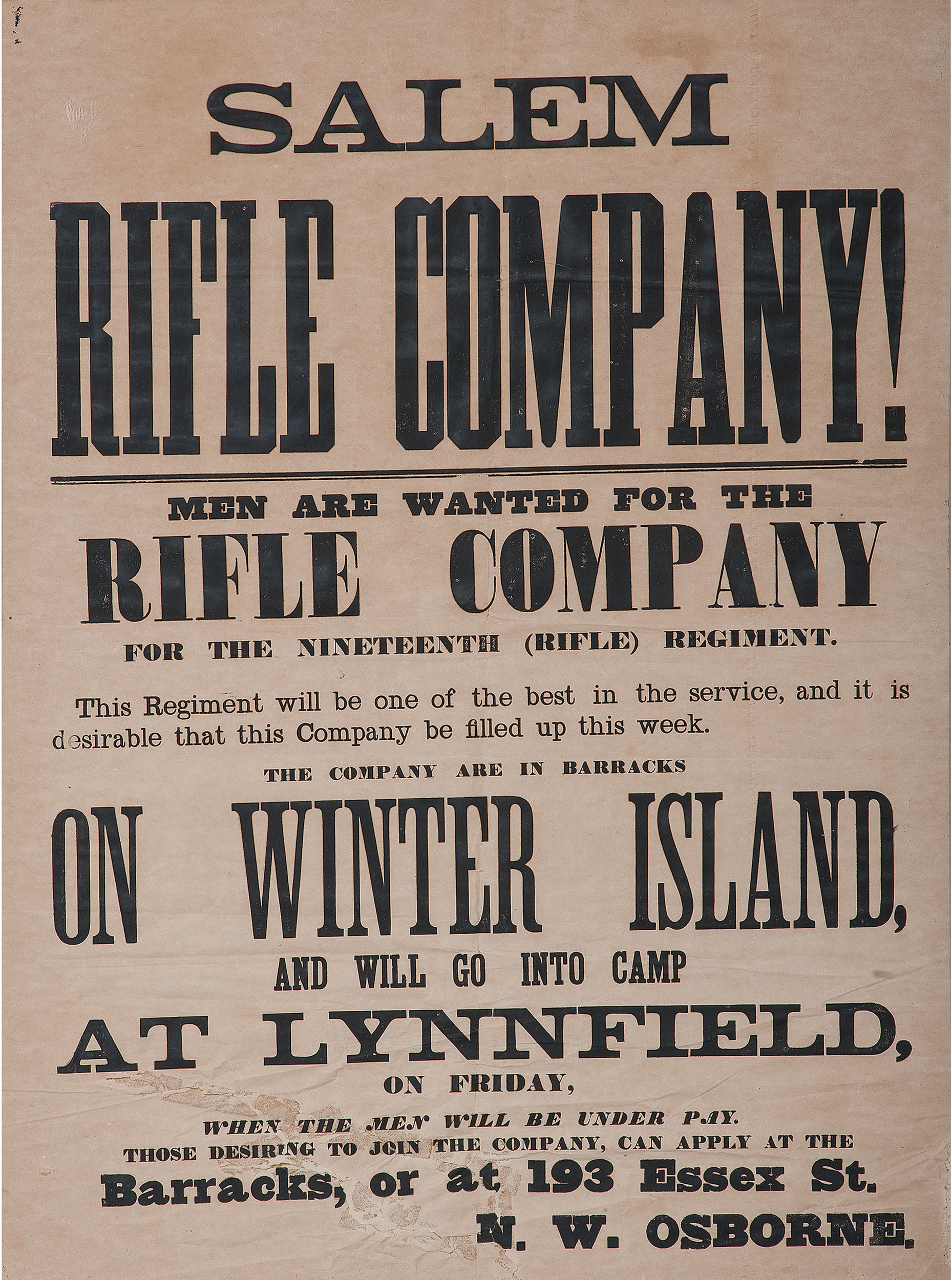
Recruiting broadside the "Rifle Company for the 19th (Rifle) Regiment" of Massachusetts, stating that the "Regiment will be one of the best in the service."

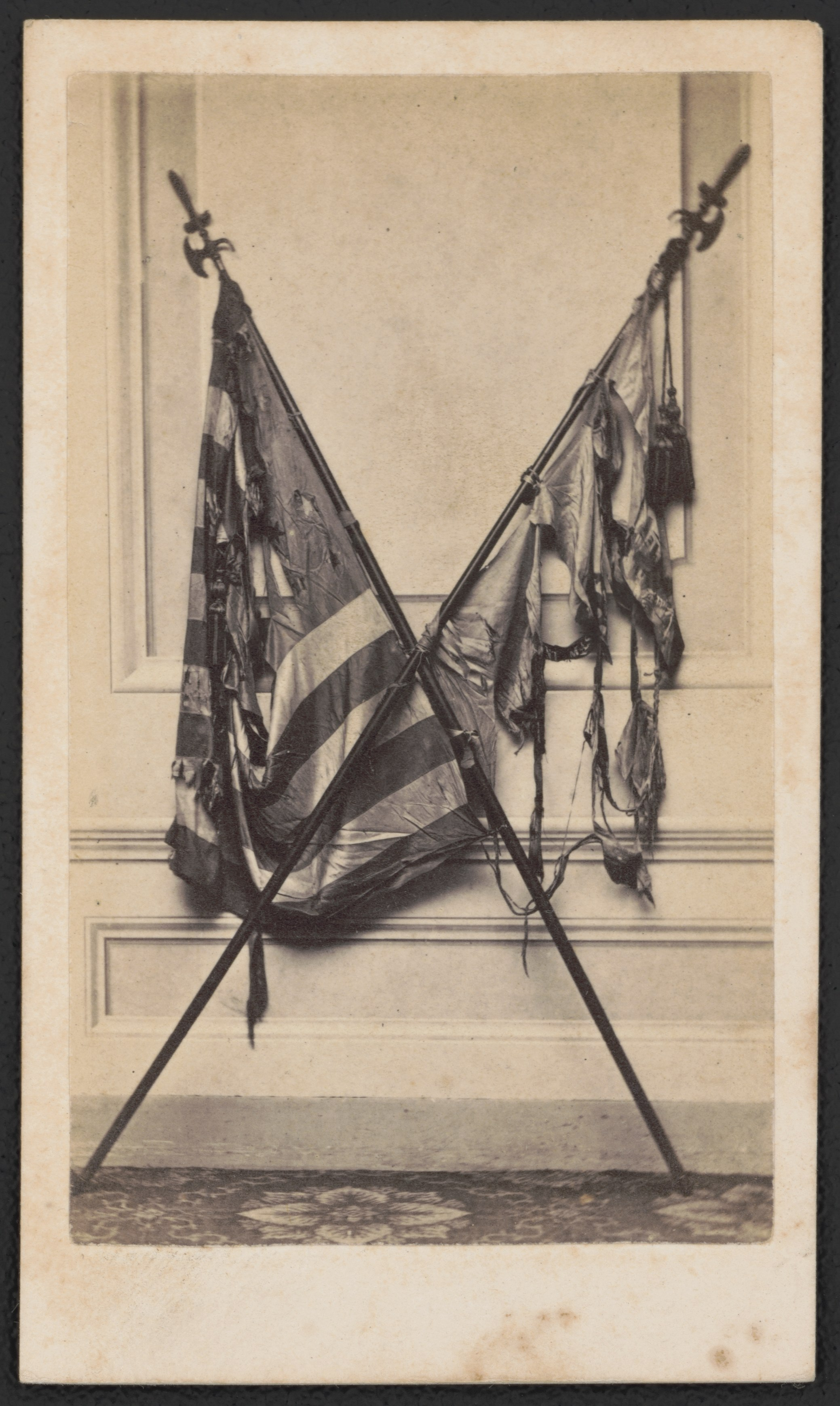
Tattered flags of the 19th Massachusetts Infantry Regiment. From the Liljenquist Family Collection of Civil War Photographs, Prints and Photographs Division, Library of Congress

The 19th Regiment Massachusetts Volunteer Infantry was an infantry regiment that served in the Union Army during the American Civil War.

== Service history ==
The 19th Massachusetts was organized at Camp Schouler in Lynnfield, Massachusetts, in April 1861. (Note: The camp was located in fields next to the South Reading Branch of the Eastern Railroad.) The 19th was largely composed of Essex County men. Its core began as three companies of the state militia's 1st Battalion Massachusetts Rifles from Essex County. (Note: The men of this battalion initialloy expected deployment to defend Washington, D., as the 3rd Battalion, based in Worcester County had done so. The 3rd Battalion had already departed, having completed the required quota from Massachusetts under that initial call. The term "rifles" was a designation frequently given to antebellum militia companies which trained in the use of rifled muskets—a relatively new innovation at the time—as opposed to smoothbore muskets. Only minor differences in training and tactics differentiated such units from a typical infantry company of the time. During the 1840s, "rifle" companies were often expected to train and serve as skirmishers in open order, however by the Civil War, United States army tactics manuals made no distinction between a company of "rifles" and a typical infantry company.)

=== Initial training ===
The three militia Rifle companies were Company A from West Newbury, B from Newburyport, and C from Rowley. Seven other companies were recruited. D, E, and I were recruited in Boston. F and G were men from Middlesex, Cambridge and Lowell respectively. Company H was recruited in Roxbury. The final, tenth company, Company K, was formed from the Tiger Fire Zouaves of Boston. (Note: A history of the regiment noted that members of this company wore a Zouave uniform of light blue baggy trousers, yellow leather leggings, with dark blue jackets with buttons and dark blue fez caps. They apparently retained the company-unique uniform until 1862.)

Men in the regiment were initially issued uniforms from the stocks of the dark-green militia rifle coats that would be replaced by the standard U.S. blue frock or sack coats that were issued just before the Peninsula Campaign in the spring of 1862. These stocks were soon depleted so that most of the companies other than the first three and last were without uniforms. Up until August 1, the regiment was slowly building up. The Commonwealth issued the new recruits either Model 1841 Mississippi rifles that had been upgraded with sights, bayonets, and new bores from the existing stocks within the Essex and Middlesex armories or Model 1842 Springfield smoothbore muskets from armories in Boston and Middlesex.

The regiment followed the standard structure of the three-year volunteer regiments of ten companies of 83-101 men (which could be split into two battalions on an ad hoc basis) and a field staff of 36–66. (Note: Cavalry regiments were organized with twelve companies of 60-80 troopers. The extra two companies, or troops, led to a volunteer cavalry regiment being slightly smaller in total compared to an infantry regiment.) The officers were divided into field staff who ran the regiment and battalions and the line or company officers who ran the companies.

On August 1, the 19th received its colonel, Edward W. Hincks, and as its lieutenant colonel, Arthur F. Devereux. Both men had prior militia and federal experience. Colonel Hinks, originally from Maine, had moved from Bangor to Boston as a printer in 1849. By 1855, he had been a state legislator and a Boston city councilor. He had affiliated and drilled in the Commonwealth's militia service with the 8th Massachusetts Militia Regiment as one of the regiment's field officers, and commanded the 8th Massachusetts during its three months' service from April to July 1861. Lieutenant Colonel Devereux had also mobilized with Hincks as commander of the regiment's Company J, which had historically been the Salem Light Infantry but Devereux had outfitted and trained as the Salem Zouaves. The same order that assigned Hincks as the colonel, also named the 19th as "the proper rendezvous for all members of the Eighth Regiment desirous of again enlisting in the service of the country."

Hincks and Devereux were both experienced militia officers who had already seen service when the 8th Massachusetts had been mobilized for 90-days service in April 1861. The 8th had earned a good reputation for discipline, drill, and ability. Deverux's company of Salem Zouaves had a reputation as one of the best drilled companies in the Commonwealth. The 8th had mustered out on July 29 and Hincks, Devereux, and the Salem Zouaves re-enlisted upon their return and immediately reported to the training camp in Lynnfield. The injection of Devereux and his Zouaves into the regiment led many to realize their prior training had been inadequate. Hincks and Devereux remedied the situation by assigning a Salem Zouave to each company as the drill sergeant. The non-commissioned officers (NCOs) from this company also were commissioned and assigned to each company. By the end of their time in Lynnfield, every company in the regiment had officers and NCOs who had served 90-day service in the 8th Massachusetts Militia's Salem Zouaves.

In the camp, the regiment turned in most of their Windsor, Vermont produced Model 1841s and received the Model 1856 Enfield Rifle. Also known as "the 2-band Enfield" and "Sergeants' Rifle," it was the rifle that the British army issued to its rifle regiments and to sergeants in its line battalions. (Note: The Federal and state governments in the U.S. (notably Massachusetts) purchased approximately 8,000 P1856 Short Rifles during the Civil War.) A handful of the Model 1841s that were in excellent condition and had been modified to .58 caliber and with rear sights and bayonets were retained, but most of the men received the new rifles and were impressed with them.

Due to a lack of personnel and infrastructure ready when the war began, the federal government left the recruiting, equipping, and providing of recruits to the states with reimbursement to come from the federal level upon muster into federal service. Since the states were handling the process, existing militia companies building to full-strength followed the existing militia practice of voting in new recruits which made recruitment slower than the new volunteer companies in the regiment. The recruiting for the militia companies nd the nw volunteer companies were working slowly when the defeat at Bull Run shook Washington, DC. In response, on July 22, Lincoln authorized the call-up of 500,000 more three-year enlistments. The debacle spurred the The next day, the Secretary of War issued a call for all available regiments and detachments to be hurried forward at once.

The salting of the regiment's companies with Salem Zouaves and other veterans of the Eighth injected a new vim and vigor into recruitment and training. The capable veterans brought a renewed sense of purpose and ramped up the training with the all field officers receiving their commissions by August 3 and the last of the staff and line officers on August 22. Despite still lacking its full paper strength, the regiment mustered into Federal service for a three-year enlistment on August 28, 1861, under the command of Colonel Hinks. The plan was to continue recruiting to bring the regiment up to strength in Massachusetts and send the recruits on in groups of drafts.

=== Deployment ===
The regiment learned that it would be joining the Army of the Potomac and spend the next two days in transit via Boston, Fall River, New York, Philadelphia, and Baltimore, to reach New Jersey Avenue Station in Washington, DC

==== Transit ====
At 15:00, Wednesday, August 28, the regiment was formed in line at Camp Schouler in Lynnfield, received its State Colors, and boarded the train on the waiting at the side of the camp. The train traveled through Salem and Lynn, arriving at North Station at 17:15. The arrival was a novel experience to many members of the regiment from the small towns in Essex and Middlesex who had never been to Boston before. The 19th marched to Boston Common where a brief farewell from the governor and state officials was given, and they had a brief meal. After an hour, it left and arrived 19:30 at the Old Colony depot joined by the 17th Massachusetts where it boarded a Fall River Line train which would take them to a Fall River Line boat for New York.

The steam ship from Fall River entered New York Harbor on Thursday morning, August 29, went up the Hudson, and disembarked on Manhattan at 13:00. It marched to the 7th New York barracks at City Hall, where it was fed in its mess, and the enlisted men received a few hours in the afternoon to see the sights. In the early evening, they marched up Broadway, through Canal to Vestry Street, to Pier 39, and went on board the Ferry boat John Potter, of the Camden and Amboy Line. Once across the Hudson in Perth Amboy, the 19th and 17th boarded the Pennsylvania Railroad train for Washington.

At 03:30 on Friday, the train carrying the two regiments stopped in Philadelphia where they received an early morning breakfast from supportive local citizens. After two hours, they were back on board the train and arrived in Baltimore at the Philadelphia, Wilmington and Baltimore Railroad's President Street Station midmorning.

Due to a thirty-year-old ordinance banning steam engines operating in the city, there was no direct steam rail connection between President Street Station and the Baltimore and Ohio Railroad's Camden Station. Rail cars that transferred between the two stations had to be pulled by horses along Pratt Street down ten blocks to the southwest to Camden Yards. Union troops marched down Pratt to the other station. It in this transfer on April 19, as the 6th Massachusetts transferred between stations, a mob of anti-war supporters and Southern sympathizers attacked the train cars and blocked the route. When it became apparent that they could travel by horse no further, the four companies, about 240 soldiers, got out of the cars and marched in formation down Pratt Street where they were attacked by the mob and opened fire in response. (Note: From Ezratty: "...the thirty-year-old ordinance forbidding the operation of steam engines in the city obliged the Union troops on both the eighteenth and nineteenth to transfer from their terminating depots on their way to Camden Station, where trains to Washington awaited them. The forced transfer made the soldiers of the 6th Massachusetts vulnerable as, unlike the Pennsylvanians a day earlier, they had to stop and wait while horsecars hitched up and then rolled over Pratt Street's rails to Camden Station.")

As a result, units got off the train immediately upon arrival at President Street, and marched under arms down Pratt Street the ten-block distance to Camden Yards. The horse-drawn rail cars only carried equipment under guard. The 19th was well aware of the large minority of southern sympathizers and also that despite the majority remaining unionist, it was also a slave state. As they began marching, they were aware of the noticeabley cold reception and glares from some of the local citizens. As the 19th and 17th turned left down Howard Street, they noticed the roof of Camden Yards filled with bullet holes from the riot of April 19.

On board a steam train again, the men soon pulled out of Camden Yards bound for Washington. This was the first time many of the men saw slaves working in fields as they passed by on the train. They also duly noted soldiers on guard duty all along the rail line between Baltimore and Washington, and for the first time saw the meting out of military punishment. The trip from Baltimore to Washington was long and tedious with continual side-tracking to yield to regular, scheduled passenger service.

==== In Washington ====
At midnight Friday, August 30, 1861, the 19th arrived at Washington Union Station, and marched into halted at Soldiers' Rest. (Note: Per Smithsonian: "Soldiers Rest was one of the largest military facilities erected in Washington, D.C. during the war years and was situated on the north side of Capitol Hill, along North Capitol Street and Delaware Avenue NW. Located next to the B&O Railroad, it provided lodging and hot meals to new recruits from the North on their way to join the Union Armies of the Potomac and Shenandoah, and also soldiers waiting to return to the battlefront and those recently paroled from Confederate prisoner camps. "Stations like Soldiers Rest were supported by the United States Sanitary Commission, a relief agency approved by the War Department on June 18, 1861 to provide assistance to sick, wounded, and traveling Union soldiers.") The regiment stood in formation under arms until a Pennsylvania regiment that had arrived just before them finished supper. The men were served a ""very bad"" meal of "mouldy soft bread, boiled salt pork and very poor coffee." In response, COL Hincks made "a vigorous protest" to the officer-in-charge giving "him religious instructions."

Since the Pennsylvania regiment had taken the barracks billeting, the 19th slept outside on the ground, luckily on a warm night, until disturbed around 04:00 by a grazing herd of hogs. The next morning when the 19th marched in to breakfast, they found that Hincks' "draft had been honored," and received "a more respectable meal." This was a portend of the life to come in the Army, and some of the older men were already finding their patriotic ardor fading.

During the afternoon, the regiment slung knapsacks and marched down Pennsylvania Avenue three miles to their new campground on Meridian Hill. The 19th set up its regimental camp there, and saw the sixteen wagons it brought with it from Camp Schouler exchanged for eleven standard issue army wagons. The fact that some of the officers and men had served in the 8th Massachusetts previously proved a great advantage, as COL Hinks began a rigid training/drill regimen that would remain routine as long as he commanded the 19th. (Note: Due to their history in the Massacgusetts Militia, Hincks and Devereux also pulled in men with whom they had served prior to the war, notably, company grade officers NCOs who stayed on in the defences of Washington after their 90-day militia regiments had returned to Massachusetts. An example of these men was the plumber, Charles A Tucker, of who had been a company orderly sergeant in the Third Battalion of Rifles. From 1854-1856, Tucker had served as the fourth lieutenant in Hincks' Company F of the Fifth Massachusetts Militia. He was waiting to go home to re-enlist when Hincks and Devereux offered him a commission.) As active drilling began in earnest, Hincks divided the field officers' duties. Hincks ran battalion drills, LTC Devereaux the manual of arms, and MAJ Howe taught camp and regimental guard/security. Since many of these veterans already had many connections among the military officials at the Capitol and throughout the District, the 19th received better logistical support than otherwise would have been the case. Encamped on the hillside, the men found battalion drill very hard, yet "from early morn till dewy eve" they went through their paces. This was done Monday through Saturday, and on Sundays, the men marched out by companies, seated in the shade, and learned the Articles of War from the officers. (Note: Adams commented, "As I remember them whatever you did you were to be shot, 'or such other punishment as may be inflicted by courts-martial.'")

At Meridian Hill, the regiment began to take on the look and air of soldiers, not knowing the future worth of all the drills, fatigues, and labors that griped about daily. This would continue for the next two weeks. While at the hill, the regiment's camp was across on the street from that of the 7th Michigan, and many close friendships immediately sprang up between the men of the two regiments, which lasted during the entire service of the regiments.

=== 1861 Operations along the Potomac ===
On September 13, the men received word that they were assigned to brigade of BGEN Frederick W Lander and ordered to march to Poolesville, Md., then the headquarters of that division, known as the "Corps of Observation," commanded by BGEN Charles P Stone. Some of the older men who had been in the militia found the first real march of a substantial distance quite difficult where some of the younger men "fresh from school or indoor life, could endure more than the men of mature years who had at first laughed at them." The route on that day passed through Leesboro and Rockville. Just before we arriving at Rockville, the men received ten rounds of ammunition and ordered to "Load at will." With the earlier service of the men in the 8th, and the 19th's passage through Baltimore in mind, they had been warned to be wary of Rockville's strong secession sentiment, but passed through without incident. (Note: Adams wroye: "... I expected to kill a rebel or be a dead Yankee before night. We marched through the town and found it as quiet as a New England village.") Before dusk, the regiment stopped for the night by a stream in Darnestown that fed into the Potomac.

The next day, Saturday, September 14, they joined their brigade at Poolesville in the evening, greeted by the men of the 15th Massachusetts, who had prepared supper and coffee for them upon arrival. This act was greatly appreciated and formed the basis a solid bond between the two regiments, which lasted throughout the war. (Note: Numerous regimental histories on both sides of the conflict describe similar treatment of new arrivals in camps from the same state, largely due to connections that were made in the militias prior to the war.) The next day, Sunday, September 15, they marched two miles out of Poolesville to Camp Benton near Edward's Ferry on the Potomac, which was to be their home for several months.

At the camp, which was on a plain, drill and instruction continued from morning until night, interspersed at intervals with picket duty. In a short time, the ability and experience of Hincks, Devereux, Howe, and the cadre from the Salem Zouaves led to a high state of discipline that attracted onlookers from other states' regiments who would surround the guard lines at drill and watch the manoeuvres taking notes. The afternoon battalion movement drills, rigid discipline on guard duty, and the wearing of newly issued dress coats with brass shoulder scales and leather neck stocks led other men to refer to the regiment as "The Nineteenth Regulars." The men took this nickname with pride, finding their unit noticeably different from other regiments being commended by their superiors for their performance. The surgeon, Dr. Dyer, wrote home:

Through the untiring exertions of Colonel Hinks, who is emphatically a working man, the general condition of the regiment has vastly improved: cleanliness and order are strictly enforced. Under the superintendence of Lieut. Col. Devereux, the companies have acquired a proficiency in drill not surpassed by many older troops. Under charge of Major Howe, the important duties of the guard are well attended to. Other departments are in good hands, and a system of strict accountability is rigidly enforced.

==== Ball's Bluff ====
Lander's Brigade, Stone's (Sedgwick's) Division, Army of the Potomac, to March 1862. 3rd Brigade, 2nd Division, II Corps, Army of the Potomac, to March 1864. 1st Brigade, 2nd Division, II Corps, to June 1865.

=== Post-war ===
The 19th Massachusetts mustered out of service on June 30, 1865, and was discharged July 22, 1865.

== Affiliations, battle honors, detailed service, and casualties ==
=== Organizational affiliation ===
Attached to:

- Lander's Brigade, Division of the Potomac, to October, 1861.
- Landers Brigade, Stone's (John Sedgwick's) Corps of Observation, Army of the Potomac (AoP), to March, 1862.
- 3rd Brigade' 2nd Division, II Corps, AoP, to March, 1864.
- 1st Brigade, 2nd Division, II Corps, AoP, to June, 1865.

=== List of battles ===
The official list of battles in which the regiment bore a part:

- Siege of Yorktown
- Battle of Seven Pines
- Seven Days Battles
- Battle of White Oak Swamp
- Battle of Antietam
- Battle of Fredericksburg
- Battle of Chancellorsville
- Battle of Gettysburg
- Bristoe Campaign
- Mine Run Campaign
- Battle of the Wilderness
- Battle of Spotsylvania Court House
- Battle of Totopotomoy Creek
- Battle of Cold Harbor
- Siege of Petersburg
- First Battle of Deep Bottom
- Second Battle of Deep Bottom
- Second Battle of Ream's Station
- Battle of Boydton Plank Road
- Appomattox Campaign
- Battle of Sutherland's Station
- Battle of Sailor's Creek
- Battle of Appomattox Court House

=== Detailed service ===
==== 1861 ====
- Left Massachusetts for Washington, D.C., August 30.
- Camp at Meridian Hill until September 12, 1861.
- Moved to Poolesville, Md., September 12–15.
- Guard duty on the Upper Potomac until December.
- Operations on the Potomac October 21–24.
- Action at Ball's Bluff October 21.
- Moved to Muddy Run December 4, and duty there until March 12, 1862.

==== 1862 ====
- Moved to Harpers Ferry, then to Charlestown and Berryville March 12–15.
- Ordered to Washington, D.C., March 24, and to the Peninsula March 27.
- Siege of Yorktown April 5-May 4.
- West Point May 7–8.
- Battle of Fair Oaks, Seven Pines, May 31-June 1.
- Seven days before Richmond June 25-July 1.
- Oak Grove, near Fair Oaks, June 25.
- Peach Orchard and Savage Station June 29.
- White Oak Swamp and Glendale June 30.
- Malvern Hill July 1.
- Harrison's Landing July 8. At Harrison's Landing until August 15.
- Movement to Alexandria August 15–28, thence to Fairfax Court House August 28–31.
- Cover Pope's retreat from Bull Run August 31-September 1.
- Maryland Campaign September–October.
- Battle of South Mountain September 14 (reserve).
- Battle of Antietam September 16–17.
- Moved to Harpers Ferry September 22, and duty there until October 30.
- Advance up Loudon Valley and movement to Falmouth, Va., October 30-November 17.
- Battle of Fredericksburg December 11–15. (Forlorn Hope to cross Rappahannock at Fredericksburg December 11.)
- Duty at Falmouth, Va., until April 1863.

==== 1863 ====
- Chancellorsville Campaign April 27-May 6.
- Maryes' Heights. Fredericksburg, May 3.
- Salem Heights May 3–4.
- Gettysburg Campaign June 11-July 24.
- Battle of Gettysburg July 2–4,
- Advance from the Rappahannock to the Rapidan September 13–17.
- Bristoe Campaign October 9–22.
- Bristoe Station October 14.
- Advance to line of the Rappahannock November 7–8.
- Mine Run Campaign November 26-December 2.
- Robertson's Tavern, or Locust Grove, November 27.
- At Stevensburg until May 1864.

==== 1864 ====
- Demonstration on the Rapidan February 6–7.
- Campaign from the Rapidan to the James May–June.
- Battles of the Wilderness May 5–7.
- Laurel Hill May 8.
- Spotsylvania May 8–12.
- Po River May 10.
- Spotsylvania Court House May 12–21.
- Assault on the Salient May 12.
- North Anna River May 23–26.
- On line of the Pamunkey May 26–28.
- Totopotomoy May 28–31.
- Cold Harbor June 1–12.
- Before Petersburg June 16–18.
- Siege of Petersburg June 16, 1864, to April 2, 1865.
- Jerusalem Plank Road June 22–23, 1864.
- Demonstration north of the James July 27–29.
- Deep Bottom July 27–28.
- Strawberry Plains, Deep Bottom, August 14–18.
- Ream's Station August 25.
- Boydton Plank Road, Hatcher's Run, October 27–28.
- Dabney's Mills, Hatcher's Run, February 5–7, 1865.

==== 1865 ====
- Watkin's House March 25.
- Appomattox Campaign March 28-April 9.
- Crow's House March 31. Fall of Petersburg April 2.
- Sailor's Creek April 6.
- High Bridge and Farmville April 7.
- Appomattox Court House April 9. Surrender of Lee and his army.
- At Burkesville until May 2.
- March to Washington May 2–13.
- Grand Review of the Armies May 23.
- Duty at Washington until June 30.

=== Casualties ===
The regiment lost a total of 294 men during service; 14 officers and 147 enlisted men killed or mortally wounded, 133 enlisted men died of disease.

== Commanders ==
- Colonel Edward Winslow Hinks
- Colonel Arthur Forrester Devereux
- Lt. Colonel Edmund Rice

== Armament ==
Soldiers in the 1st Battalion Massachusetts Rifles, the three core Essex County militia companies were armed with Model 1841 Mississippi rifles. (Note: Adams refers to these as "Winsor" muskets.) These rifles had been manufactured by contract in 1844 in Windsor, Vermont by the Robbins, Kendall, and Lawrence Armory (RK&L) which had also made the 1855 modifications of increasing the bore to .58 and fitting them with a sword bayonet. (Note: The company's first order was for 10,000 model 1841 rifles for $11.90 each on February 18, 1845. Contracted to produce 2,000 annually, RK&L finished the contract by mid-1848, 18 months early. By January 5, 1848, Kendall had left and the company was operating as Robbins and Lawrence (R&L) when they revceived a contract to make a further 15,000 at 3,000 per annum, completing in 1853. After the introduction of the Model 1855 Springfield, R&L also received the contract to upgrade M1841s to the War Department's order to align them with the new Springfield in an 1855-1856 upgrade. They had also been able to sell gun making machinery (150 in all), to upgrade the new Enfield Armory in England. The British also awarded a later contract during the Crimean War for 25,000 Enfield P1853 and P1856 rifles. The contract's stiff penalty clause for missing the production schedule caused R&L to go bankrupt in 1859. Lamon, Goodnow and Yale (LG&Y) bought the factory to make sewing machines, but the onset of the war led them to continue producing the P1853, P1856, and licensed Sharps 1859s for the duration of the war.) The 19th Massachusetts was an 1861, Army of the Potomac, three-year volunteer regiment built around a core of prewar militia, that greatly increased the number of men under arms in the federal army. As with many of these volunteers, initially, there were not enough Model 1841s to go around so the 15th, 16th and 19th were issued a mix of imported and Robbins and Lawrence produced Pattern 1856 Enfield short rifle. These were the standard rifles for the British army Sergeants in line battalions and the rifle regiments. The similar size to the M1841 (they both had 33-inch barrels) meant that the three regiments were issued the P1856. The 1856 Enfield was a .577 calibre Minié-type muzzle-loading rifle that like all other nominal .577 caliber weapons could fire U.S. government issued .58 paper cartridges. It was used by both armies and was the second most widely used Enfield in the Union forces. By the time of the Peninsula campaign, the Model 1841s had been turned back in to the Commonwealth so that the regiment had been completely issued the 1856 Enfield with the saber bayonet. Between Fredericksburg and Chancellorsville, the regiment drew model 1855, 1861 National Armory (NA) and contract (Note: In government records, National Armory refers to one of three United States Armory and Arsenals, the Springfield Armory, the Harpers Ferry Armory, and the Rock Island Arsenal. Rifle-muskets, muskets, and rifles were manufactured in Springfield and Harper's Ferry before the war. When the Rebels destroyed the Harpers Ferry Armory early in the American Civil War and stole the machinery for the Confederate central government-run Richmond Armory, the Springfield Armory was briefly the only government manufacturer of arms, until the Rock Island Arsenal was established in 1862. During this time production ramped up to unprecedented levels ever seen in American manufacturing up until that time, with only 9,601 rifles manufactured in 1860, rising to a peak of 276,200 by 1864. These advancements would not only give the Union a decisive technological advantage over the Confederacy during the war but served as a precursor to the mass production manufacturing that contributed to the post-war Second Industrial Revolution and 20th century machine manufacturing capabilities. American historian Merritt Roe Smith has drawn comparisons between the early assembly machining of the Springfield rifles and the later production of the Ford Model T, with the latter having considerably more parts, but producing a similar numbers of units in the earliest years of the 1913–1915 automobile assembly line, indirectly due to mass production manufacturing advancements pioneered by the armory 50 years earlier. These rifles were also produced by contracted commercial arms compnies who, by the contract, had to meet the NA manufacturing specifications.) rifle-muskets. The regiment reported the following surveys:

Fredericksburg

- A — Unreported, probably mix of Pattern 1856 Enfield, sabre bayonet, (.58 and .577 Cal.); Model 1841 Mississippi rifles, sabre bayonet, (.58 Cal.)
- B — 14 Pattern 1856 Enfield, sabre bayonet, (.58 and .577 Cal.)
- C — Unreported, probably mix of Pattern 1856 Enfield, sabre bayonet, (.58 and .577 Cal.); Model 1841 Mississippi rifles, sabre bayonet, (.58 Cal.)
- D — 34 Pattern 1856 Enfield, sabre bayonet, (.58 and .577 Cal.)
- E — 25 Pattern 1856 Enfield, sabre bayonet, (.58 and .577 Cal.)
- F — 41 Pattern 1856 Enfield, sabre bayonet, (.58 and .577 Cal.)
- G — Unreported, probably mix of Pattern 1856 Enfield, sabre bayonet, (.58 and .577 Cal.); Model 1841 Mississippi rifles, sabre bayonet, (.58 Cal.)
- H — 14, Pattern 1856 Enfield, sabre bayonet, (.58 and .577 Cal.)
- I — Unreported, probably mix of Pattern 1856 Enfield, sabre bayonet, (.58 and .577 Cal.); Model 1841 Mississippi rifles, sabre bayonet, (.58 Cal.)
- K — 13, Pattern 1856 Enfield, sabre bayonet, (.58 and .577 Cal.)

Chancellorsville

- A — 15 Pattern 1856 Enfield, sabre bayonet, (.58 and .577 Cal.); 3 Springfield Rifled Muskets, model 1855, 1861, NA and contract, (.58 Cal.)
- B — 14 Pattern 1856 Enfield, sabre bayonet, (.58 and .577 Cal.); 4 Springfield Rifled Muskets, model 1855, 1861, NA and contract, (.58 Cal.)
- C — 17 Pattern 1856 Enfield, sabre bayonet, (.58 and .577 Cal.); 5 Springfield Rifled Muskets, model 1855, 1861, NA and contract, (.58 Cal.)
- D — 29 Pattern 1856 Enfield, sabre bayonet, (.58 and .577 Cal.); 2 Springfield Rifled Muskets, model 1855, 1861, NA and contract, (.58 Cal.)
- E — 29 Pattern 1856 Enfield, sabre bayonet, (.58 and .577 Cal.);
- F — 21 Pattern 1856 Enfield, sabre bayonet, (.58 and .577 Cal.); 4 Springfield Rifled Muskets, model 1855, 1861, NA and contract, (.58 Cal.)
- G — 21 Pattern 1856 Enfield, sabre bayonet, (.58 and .577 Cal.); 2 Springfield Rifled Muskets, model 1855, 1861, NA and contract, (.58 Cal.)
- H — 18 Pattern 1856 Enfield, sabre bayonet, (.58 and .577 Cal.); 4 Springfield Rifled Muskets, model 1855, 1861, NA and contract, (.58 Cal.)
- I — 20 Pattern 1856 Enfield, sabre bayonet, (.58 and .577 Cal.); 7 Springfield Rifled Muskets, model 1855, 1861, NA and contract, (.58 Cal.)
- K — 13 Pattern 1856 Enfield, sabre bayonet, (.58 and .577 Cal.); 3 Springfield Rifled Muskets, model 1855, 1861, NA and contract, (.58 Cal.)

=== Shoulder Arms ===
Issued weapons

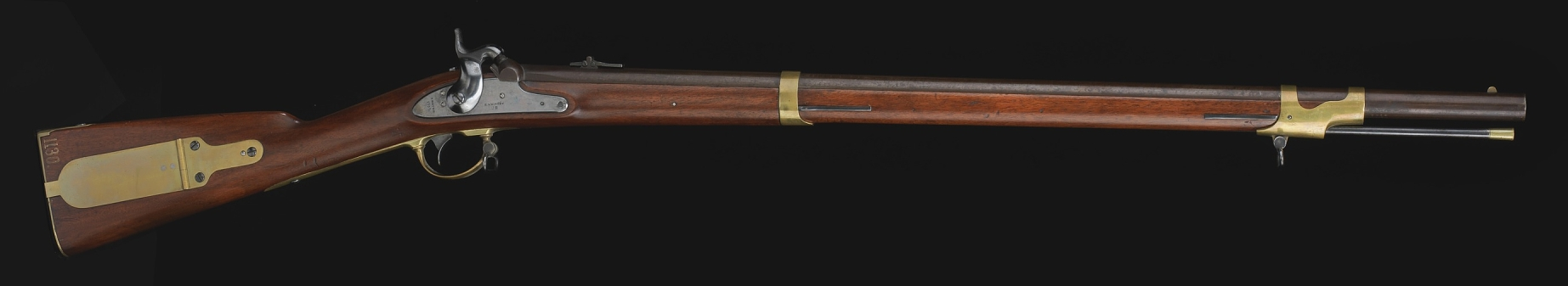
M1841 Mississippi rifle

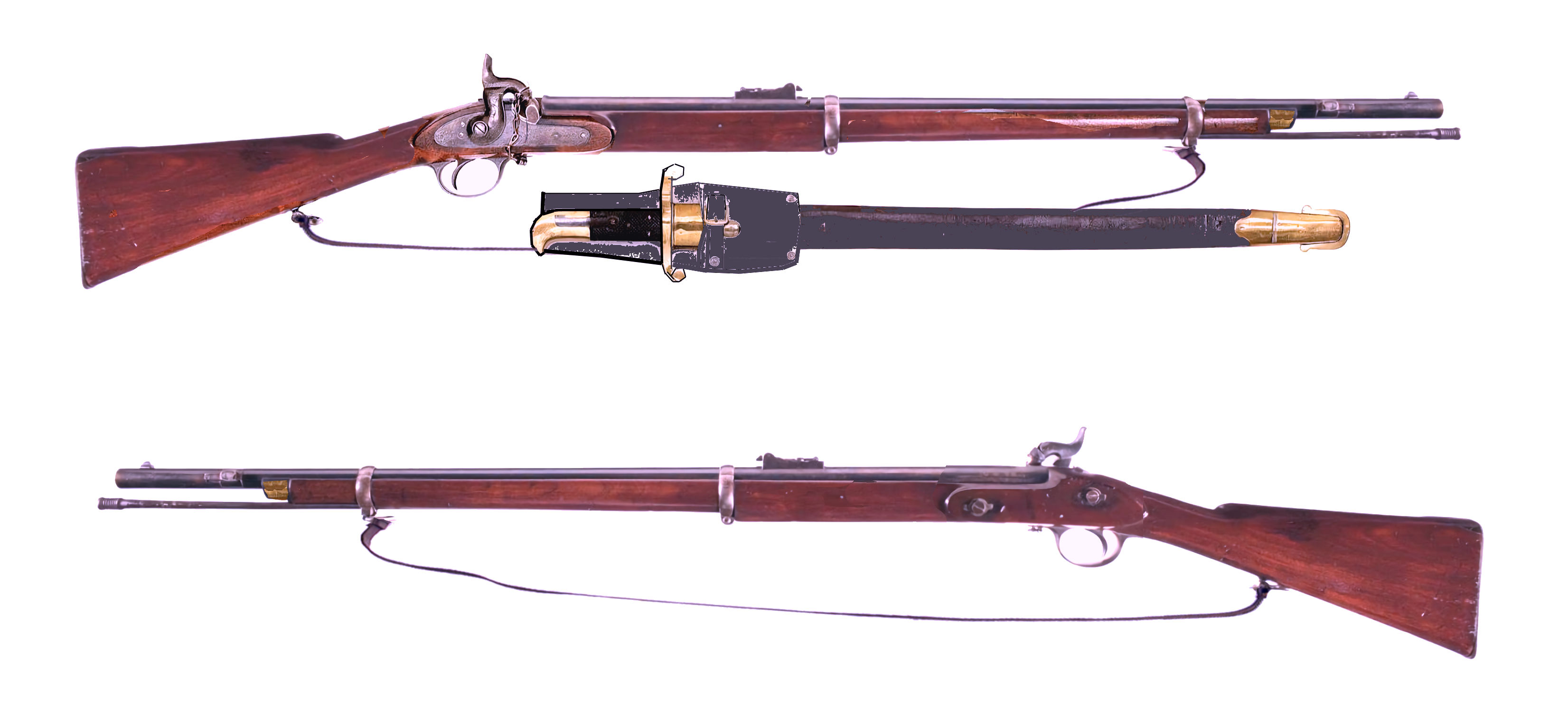
1856 Enfield short rifle

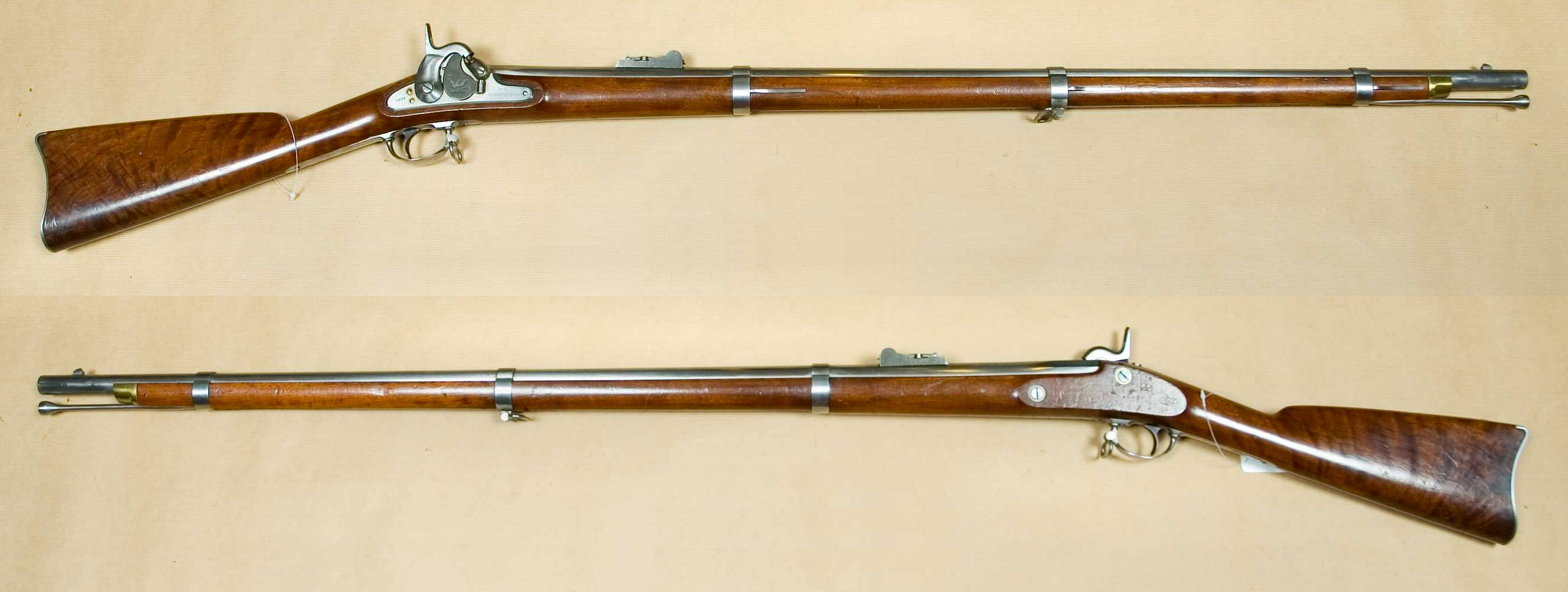
Springfield Model 1855

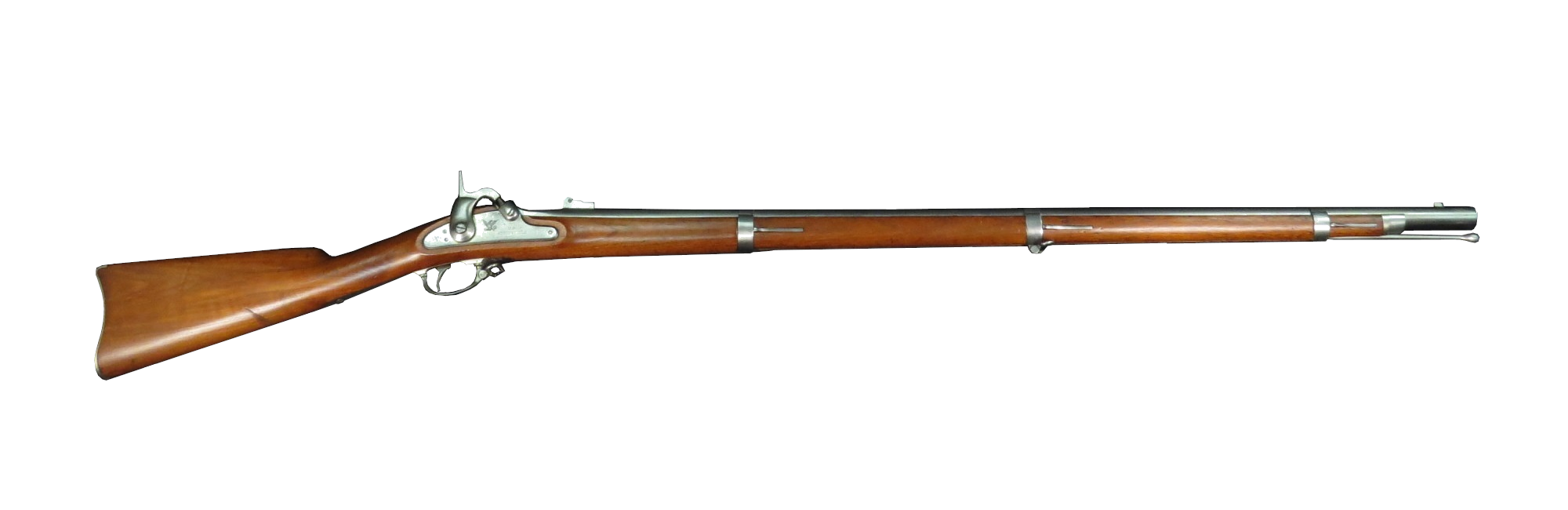
Springfield Model 1861

== Uniform ==
The men of the regiment were issued their initial uniforms as they became available during training in Lynnfield. The members who had been Salem Zouaves apparently retained their distinctive uniform for a while before adopting the standard federal uniform of dark blue sack coats, sky blue trousers, and the sky blue winter overcoat. Company K retained their Zouave uniform through 1863; it consisted of dark blue Zouave jacket trimmed in sky blue, sky blue fez, sky blue waist sash, and sky blue pantaloons tucked into canvas gaiters. From photographs in the regimental history, the Hardee hat and slouch hat seemed to be more common than the kepi, or forage cap, among the non-Zouave companies in the regiment.

== Notable members ==
- Adolphus Greely - Medal of Honor recipient in recognition of his long and distinguished career; the second person to be awarded the Medal of Honor for "lifetime achievement"
- Edmund Rice - Medal of Honor recipient for action at the Battle of Gettysburg, July 3
- John G. B. Adams, Company I - Medal of Honor recipient for action at the Battle of Fredericksburg
- Benjamin Franklin Falls, Company A - Medal of Honor recipient for action at the Battle of Gettysburg, July 3; killed in action at the Battle of Spotsylvania
- Benjamin H. Jellison, Company C - Medal of Honor recipient for action at the Battle of Gettysburg, July 3
- Joseph H. De Castro, Company I - Medal of Honor recipient for action at the Battle of Gettysburg, July 3; the first Hispanic-American to be awarded the United States' highest military decoration for valor in combat
- John H. Robinson, Company I - Medal of Honor recipient for action at the Battle of Gettysburg, July 3
- Dr. J. Franklin Dyer, MD, Regimental surgeon, author of The Journal of a Civil War Surgeon (2003)

== Monuments and memorials ==
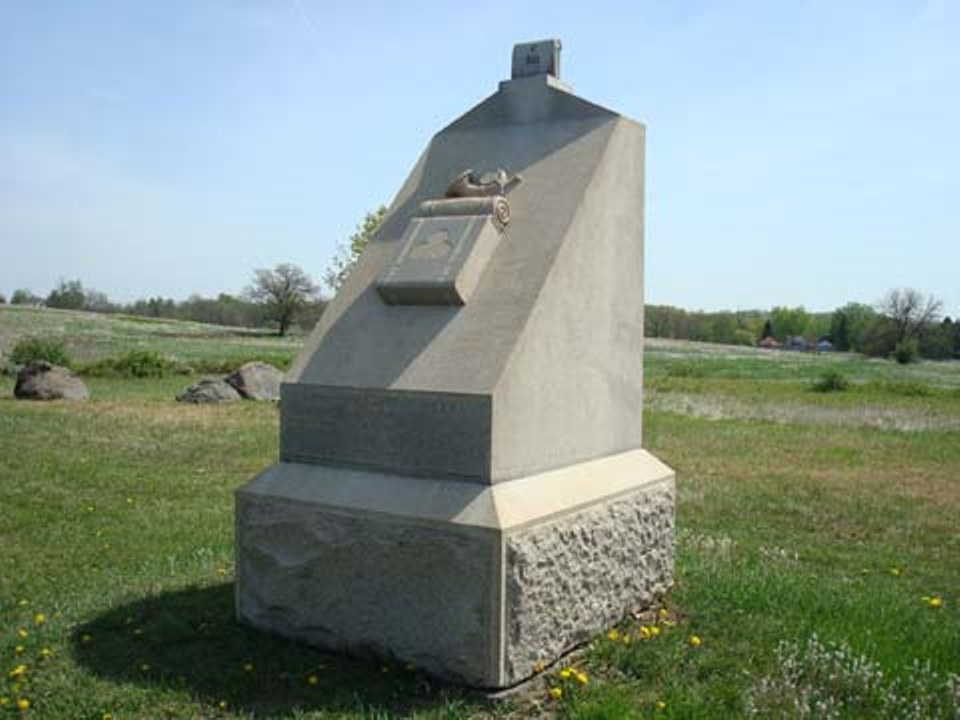
19th Massachusetts Infantry Monument, Gettysburg National Battlefield, 1898.

During the 1880s, planning was undertaken to erect a monument on the Gettysburg National Battlefield which would honor the 1863 service of the 19th Massachusetts Volunteer Infantry at Gettysburg. That 7-foot tall monument, with a carved relief of a cartridge box on its top and of a bugle and knapsack on its slanting front face was subsequently produced by Smith Granite Company in Westerly, Rhode Island. It was dedicated by the Commonwealth of Massachusetts in 1885. The granite monument is located on Hancock Avenue at 39.811503°N 77.235416°W near the Copse of Trees.

== See also ==
- List of Massachusetts Civil War Units
- Massachusetts in the American Civil War
