= Joseph H. De Castro =

United States Army Medal of Honor recipient

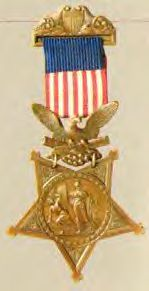
- Born: November 14, 1844; Boston, Massachusetts
- Died: May 8, 1892 (aged 47); New York City, New York
- Burial place: Fairmount Cemetery, Newark, New Jersey
- Military career
- Allegiance: United States of America
- Branch: United States Army; Union Army
- Rank: Corporal
- Unit: 19th Massachusetts Volunteer Infantry Regiment - Company I
- Conflicts: American Civil War; Battle of Gettysburg
- Awards: Medal of Honor; Civil War Campaign Medal

Joseph H. De Castro (November 14, 1844 – May 8, 1892) was the first Hispanic American to be awarded the United States's highest military decoration for valor in combat—the Medal of Honor—for having distinguished himself during Pickett's Charge in the Battle of Gettysburg of the American Civil War.

== Early years ==
De Castro was born in Boston, Massachusetts. Upon the outbreak of the Civil War, he was among the men who joined the all-volunteer 19th Massachusetts Infantry.

== Civil War service ==
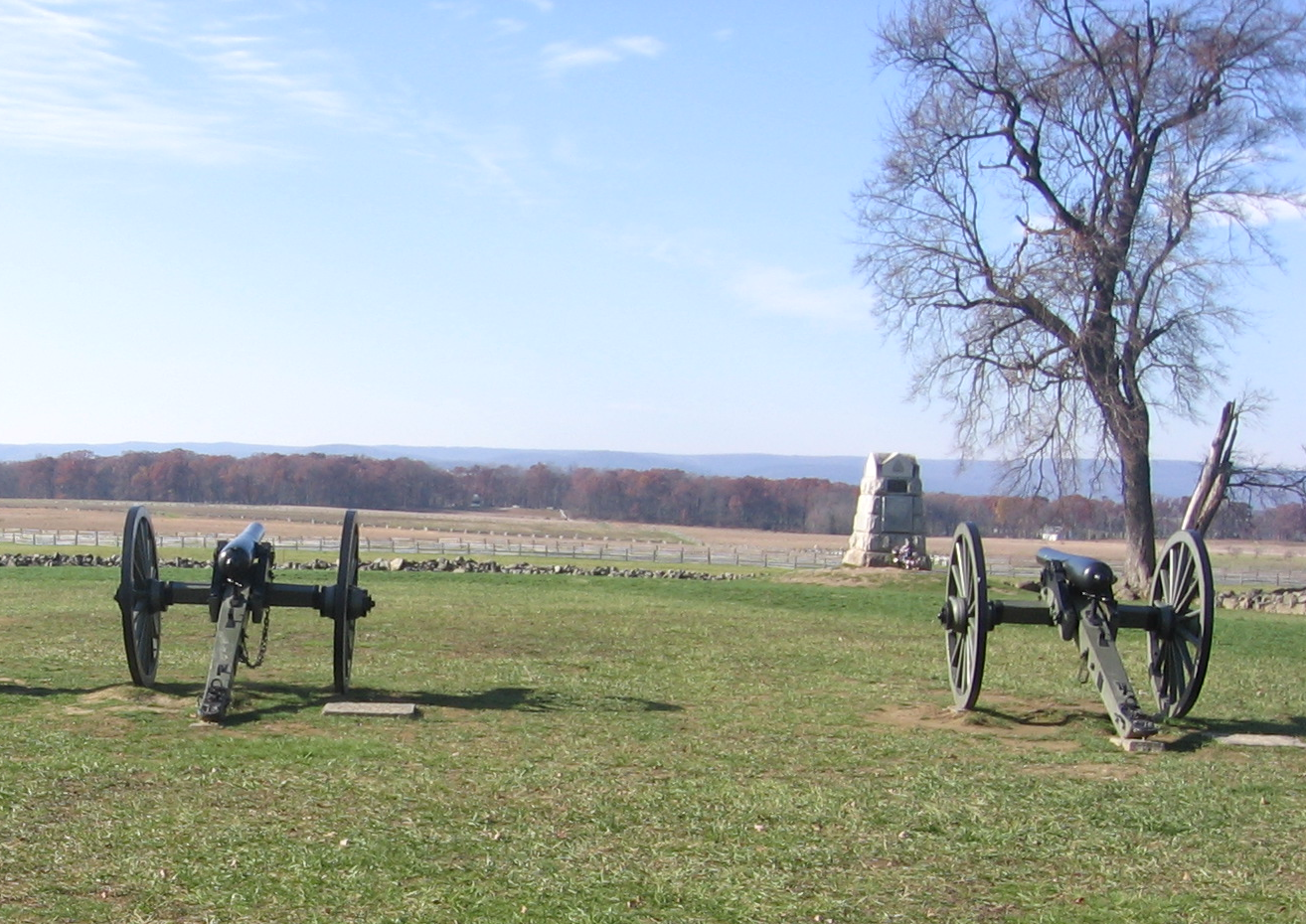
Cannons representing Hancock's defenses, stormed by Pickett's Charge.

De Castro bore the Flag of Massachusetts for Company I, 19th Massachusetts Infantry. The unit participated in the Battle of Gettysburg at Gettysburg, Pennsylvania as part of the III Corps, 3rd Brigade, U.S. Army under the command of Colonel Norman J. Hall. On July 3, 1863, the third and last day of the battle, his unit participated in the repulse of what became known as Pickett's Charge. The charge was a disastrous infantry assault ordered by Confederate General Robert E. Lee against Major General George G. Meade's Union positions on Cemetery Ridge.

During the battle, De Castro attacked a Confederate flag bearer from the 14th Virginia Infantry regiment with the staff of his own flag and seized the 19th Virginia's colors, handing the prize to Colonel Arthur F. Devereux. Colonel Devereux is quoted as saying, "At the instant a man broke through my lines and thrust a rebel battle flag into my hands. He never said a word and darted back. It was Corporal Joseph H. De Castro, one of my color bearers. He had knocked down a color bearer in the enemy's line with the staff of the Massachusetts State colors, seized the falling flag and dashed it to me". On December 1, 1864, De Castro was one of seven men from the 19th Massachusetts Infantry to be awarded the Medal of Honor.

== Medal of Honor citation ==
Medal of Honor citation:

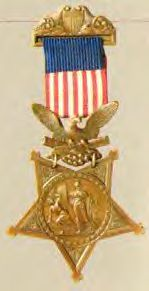

Sergeant Joseph H. De Castro

Rank and organization: Corporal, Company I, 19th Massachusetts Infantry
Place and date:At Gettysburg, Pa., July 3, 1863
Born:Boston, Mass.
Date of issue: December 1, 1864
Citation:

Capture of flag of 19th Virginia regiment (C.S)

== Post Civil War ==
After the war De Castro entered the regular Army and served for a few years. De Castro married Rosalia Rodriguez and in 1882 moved to New York City. There he was an active member of the Phil Kearny Post Number 8 of the Grand Army of the Republic. During his civilian years, he was employed by the New York Barge Office. On May 8, 1892, De Castro died in his home, which was located at 244 West 22nd Street. His funeral was held at the 18th Street Methodist Church in New York City and he was buried at Fairmount Cemetery (Section 2, Lot 300, Grave 2) in Newark, New Jersey.

== In popular culture ==
In Netflix's television series House of Cards in Season 2 Episode 8, outgoing President Garrett Walker's White House Chief of Staff, Linda Vasquez, presented De Castro's Medal of Honor to Vice President Frank Underwood as a farewell gift because Frank used to paint Civil War Era toy soldiers as a hobby.

== Awards and decorations ==
Joseph H. De Castro's awards and decorations include the following:

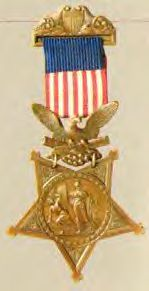
Medal of Honor
(Army version)

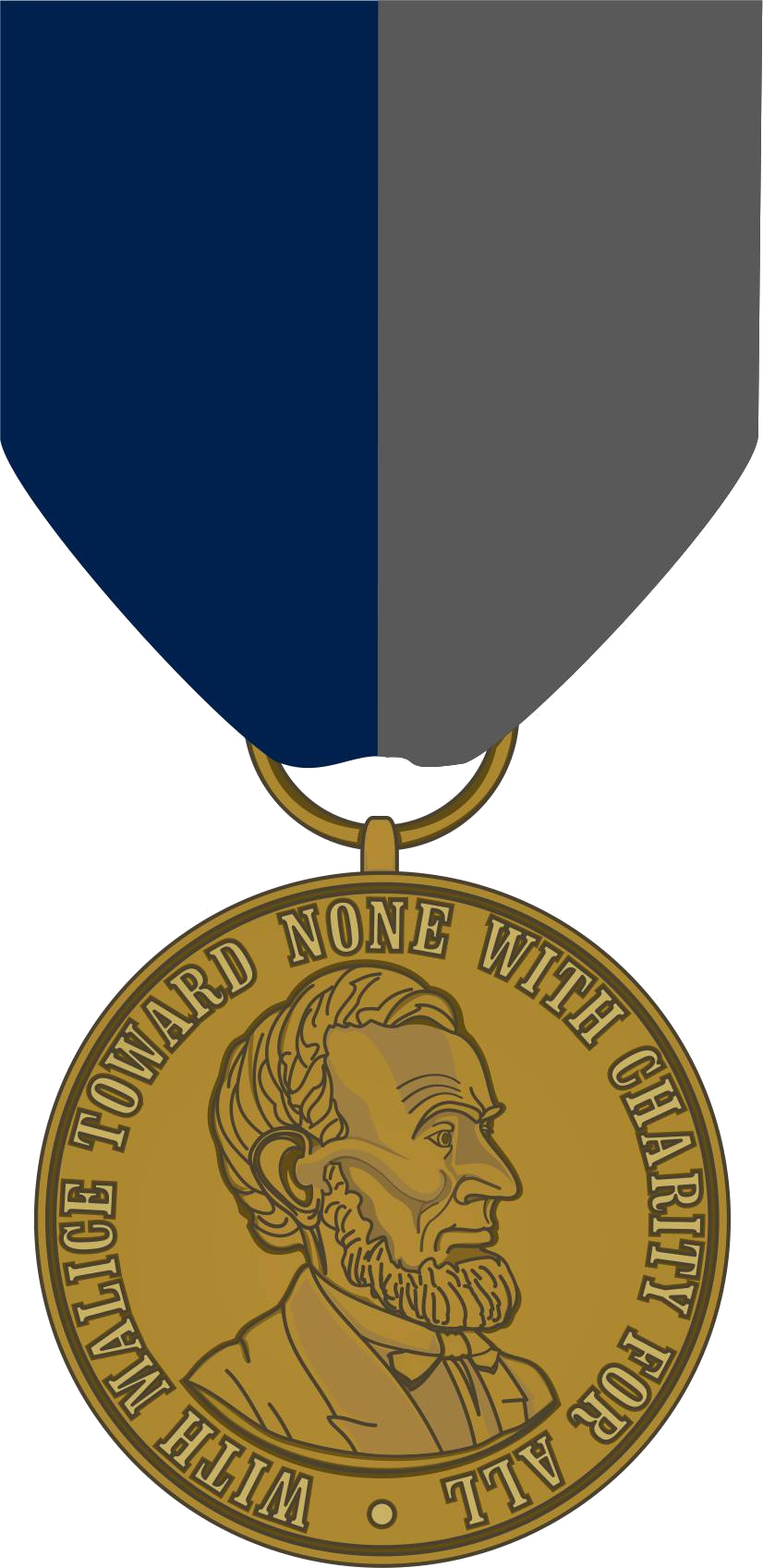
Army Civil War
Campaign Medal

== See also ==
- List of Medal of Honor recipients for the Battle of Gettysburg
- List of Hispanic Medal of Honor recipients
- List of American Civil War Medal of Honor recipients: A–F
- Hispanics in the American Civil War
