= Senator Stearns (disambiguation) =

Ozora P. Stearns (1831–1896) was a U.S. Senator from Minnesota in 1871. Senator Stearns may also refer to:

- Asahel Stearns (1774–1839), Massachusetts State Senate
- Charles H. Stearns (1854–1936), Vermont State Senate
- George M. Stearns (1831–1894), Massachusetts State Senate
- Onslow Stearns (1810–1878), New Hampshire State Senate
