= Benjamin H. Jellison =

Medal of Honor recipient (1845–1924)

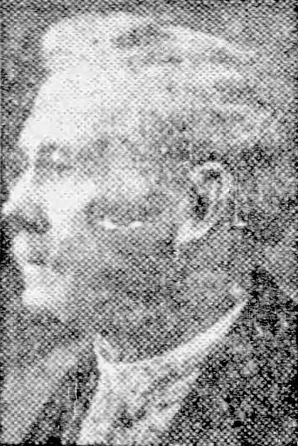
- Born: December 29, 1845; Newburyport, Massachusetts, US
- Died: April 5, 1924 (aged 78); Reading, Massachusetts, US
- Burial place: Newburyport, Massachusetts, US
- Military career
- Allegiance: United States of America
- Branch: United States Army; Union Army; Massachusetts militia
- Service years: 1861–1865 (army); 1873–1893 (militia)
- Rank: Sergeant (army); Captain (militia)
- Units: Company C, 19th Massachusetts Infantry
- Conflicts: Battle of Gettysburg
- Awards: Medal of Honor

Benjamin H. Jellison (December 29, 1845 – April 5, 1924) was an American soldier who fought in the American Civil War. Jellison received his country's highest award for bravery during combat, the Medal of Honor. Jellison's medal was won for his heroism at the Battle of Gettysburg, Pennsylvania on July 3, 1863. He was honored with the award on December 1, 1864.

Jellison was one of seven soldiers from the 19th Massachusetts Infantry who were awarded the Medal of Honor. He joined the Army in July 1861, and mustered out with his regiment in June 1865. After the civil war, Jellison served in the Massachusetts militia from 1873 to 1893, where he was promoted to captain, having entered the militia as a private.

Jellison died in Reading, Massachusetts on April 5, 1924, and was buried in Haverhill, Massachusetts.

== Medal of Honor citation ==
The President of the United States of America, in the name of Congress, takes pleasure in presenting the Medal of Honor to Sergeant Benjamin H. Jellison, United States Army, for extraordinary heroism on 3 July 1863, while serving with Company C, 19th Massachusetts Infantry, in action at Gettysburg, Pennsylvania, for capture of flag of 57th Virginia Infantry (Confederate States of America). He also assisted in taking prisoners.

== See also ==
- List of Medal of Honor recipients for the Battle of Gettysburg
- List of American Civil War Medal of Honor recipients: G–L
