= First Battle of Petersburg =

Battle of the American Civil War

Coordinates: 37.2038°N 77.3831°W

- Part of the American Civil War
Date	June 9, 1864
Location	Petersburg, Virginia
Result	Confederate victory

Belligerents
United States (Union)	(Confederate States of America) CSA (Confederacy)

Commanders and leaders
Quincy A. Gillmore; Edward W. Hinks; August Kautz	P.G.T. Beauregard; Henry A. Wise

Strength
4,500	2,500

Casualties and losses
40	80

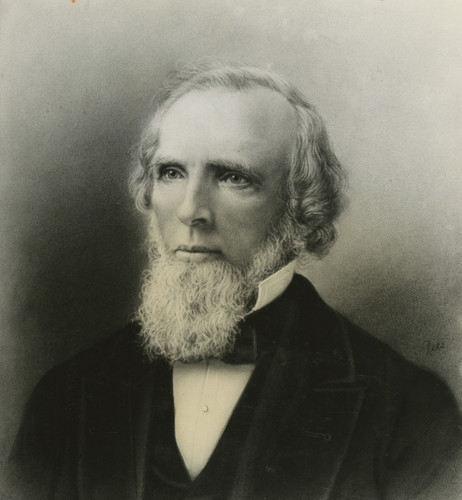
Lieut. Col. Fletcher Harris Archer, of the 3rd Virginia Reserves Battalion Infantry

The Battle of Petersburg was an unsuccessful Union assault against the earthworks fortification, the Dimmock Line, protecting the city of Petersburg, Virginia, June 9, 1864, during the American Civil War. Because of the ragtag group of defenders involved, it is sometimes known as the Battle of Old Men and Young Boys.

== Background ==
In early June, Lt. Gen. Ulysses S. Grant and Gen. Robert E. Lee were engaged in the Overland Campaign, facing each other in their trenches after the bloody Battle of Cold Harbor. Meanwhile, Maj. Gen. Benjamin Butler was bottled up in the Bermuda Hundred area to the east of Richmond, Virginia, attempting to distract Lee by attacking Richmond. Butler realized that Richmond was supplied by railroads that converged in the city of Petersburg, to the south, and that taking Petersburg would cripple Lee's supply lines. He was also aware that Confederate troops had been moving north to reinforce Lee, leaving the defenses of Petersburg in a vulnerable state. Sensitive to his failure in the Bermuda Hundred Campaign, Butler sought to achieve a success to vindicate his generalship. He wrote, "the capture of Petersburg lay near my heart."

Petersburg was protected by fortifications known as the Dimmock Line, a line of earthworks 10 miles (16 km) long, east of the city, including 55 artillery batteries, and anchored on the Appomattox River. The 2,500 Confederates stretched thin along this defensive line were commanded by a former Virginia governor, Brig. Gen. Henry A. Wise; the overall defense of Richmond and Petersburg was the responsibility of Gen. P.G.T. Beauregard, commander of the Department of North Carolina and Southern Virginia.

Butler's plan was formulated on the afternoon of June 8, calling for 3 columns to cross the Appomattox and advance from City Point (now named Hopewell, Virginia) with 4,500 men. The first and second consisted of infantry from Maj. Gen. Quincy A. Gillmore's X Corps and U.S. Colored Troops from Brig. Gen. Edward W. Hinks's 3rd Division of XVIII Corps, which would attack the Dimmock Line east of the city. The third was 1,300 cavalrymen under Brig. Gen. August Kautz, who would sweep around Petersburg and strike it from the southeast. If any of these three forces made a breakthrough, it would be able to move into the rear of the defenders opposing the other two. Butler originally designated Hinks to command the operation, but Gillmore insisted that he was the senior officer and Butler later complained, "I was fool enough to yield to him."

== Battle ==
The troops moved out on the night of June 8, but made poor progress. The column of Gillmore's infantry got lost in the dark. Although Hinks arrived on time, he was ordered to wait for Gillmore so that all of the infantry could cross before the cavalry. Eventually the infantry crossed by 3:40 a.m. on June 9 and were ordered to move forward against the enemy's picket line at daylight. By 7 a.m., both Gillmore and Hinks had encountered the enemy, but stopped at their fronts. Gillmore, an engineering officer with no experience leading troops in combat, hesitated at the sight of the formidable earthworks. Hinks also felt that the Confederate defenses were too strong and that he could not move forward unless Gillmore attacked with him. Gillmore told Hinks that he would attack but that both of the infantry columns should await the cavalry assault from the south.

Kautz's men did not arrive until noon, however, having been delayed en route by numerous enemy pickets. They assaulted the Dimmock Line where it crossed the Jerusalem Plank Road (present-day U.S. Route 301), at Battery 27, also known as Rives's Salient, with 150 militiamen, commanded by Lieut. Col. Fletcher H. Archer, manning two artillery lunettes. Kautz launched a probing attack by the 5th Pennsylvania Cavalry against the militiamen, then paused and ordered his men to dismount. Confederate Brig. Gen. Raleigh E. Colston, who happened to be in the city without assignment at the time, brought forward a 12-pound howitzer to fire at the Union cavalrymen, but found that he had no antipersonnel rounds. Colston retreated under pressure as the 5th Pennsylvania Cavalry, the 1st District of Columbia Cavalry, and the 11th Pennsylvania Cavalry began to flank him.

Kautz then launched his main attack by the 11th Pennsylvania against the Home Guard, a group consisting primarily of teenagers, elderly men, and some wounded soldiers from city hospitals. The Home Guards retreated to the city with heavy losses, but by this time Beauregard had been able to bring reinforcements from Richmond to bear: the 4th North Carolina Cavalry, part of the 7th Confederate States Cavalry from the Bermuda Hundred line, and an artillery battery. They were able to repulse the Union assault. Kautz, hearing no activity on Gillmore's front, presumed that he was left on his own and withdrew.

== Aftermath ==
Confederate casualties were about 80, Union 40. Butler was furious with Gillmore's timidity and incompetence and arrested him. Gillmore requested a court of inquiry, which was never convened, but Grant later reassigned him and the incident was dropped. On June 14–17, Grant and the Army of the Potomac slipped away from Lee and crossed the James River. They began moving towards Petersburg to support and renew Butler's assaults. The Second Battle of Petersburg and the Siege of Petersburg would soon follow.

== Preservation ==
The Petersburg National Battlefield covers only part of the battlegrounds around Petersburg. The American Battlefield Trust and its partners have preserved 131 additional acres of the Petersburg battlefield through mid-2023.
