= 8th Massachusetts Militia Regiment =

8th Regiment Massachusetts Volunteer Militia
- Active: April 16, 1861–August 1, 1861 September 15, 1862–August 7, 1863 and July 13, 1864–November 10, 1864
- Country: United States of America
- Allegiance: Union
- Branch: Union Army
- Type: Infantry

Commanders
- Notable commanders: Lt. Col. Edward Hinks

The 8th Regiment Massachusetts Volunteer Militia was a peacetime regiment of infantry that was activated for federal service in the Union Army for three separate tours during the American Civil War. The regiment consisted almost entirely of companies from Essex County, Massachusetts. The Cushing Guards, established 1775, were Company A based in Newburyport. The Lafayette Guards, created 1825, were Company B from Marblehead. Company C, the Sutton Light Infantry, organized in 1805 as the Marblehead Light Infantry, was also from Marblehead. The Lynn Light Infantry, chartered in 1852 was Company D. Company E was the Beverly Light Infantry, organized in 1814. The second Lynn company was Company F, the City Guards, organized in 1814. The Gloucester unit in the regiment was Company G, the American Guards, first organized in 1788. The third and last Marblehead company was H, the Glover Light Guards, created in 1852 and named in honor of John Glover of the Revolution. The Salem Light Infantry, Company J, had been created in 1805 and in 1859 had taken up Zouave drill and were thence known as the Salem Zouaves. The lone non-Essex company was Company K, the Allen Guards, created in 1806, that came to the regiment from Berkshire County's reorganized old Tenth Militia regiment, and based in Pittsfield.

The unit was one of four Massachusetts militia regiments to respond to Abraham Lincoln's call for 75,000 volunteer troops after the Battle of Fort Sumter on April 15, 1861. Three companies of the 8th Massachusetts earned the distinction of being the first troops to report to Boston, arriving less than a day after the call. During their first "90 days" term, the regiment mainly served garrison duty in the vicinity of Elkridge, Maryland, repairing and guarding the railroad line between Washington, D.C., and Baltimore. Shortly after arriving in Maryland, the regiment briefly occupied the United States Naval Academy, securing that installation and the USS Constitution, both of which were believed to be in danger of capture by Confederate troops.

Many members of the regiment enlisted in the 19th Massachusetts Volunteer Infantry after their return to the Commonwealth in July. Almost all of the Salem Zouaves joined that regiment where they, along with the Boston Tiger Fire Zouaves, provided the drill cadre. Almost all the non-commissioned officers from the Salem Zouaves received commissions from Governor Andrews in the 19th.

The regiment was again activated in September 1862 for a term of nine months. The 8th Massachusetts was stationed in New Bern, North Carolina, participated in several expeditions and saw minor skirmishing. The regiment responded to a third call for an enlistment of 100 days in July 1864. During their final term of service, the 8th Massachusetts served garrison duty in and around Baltimore. The regiment did not suffer any casualties in combat but lost 15 men due to disease.

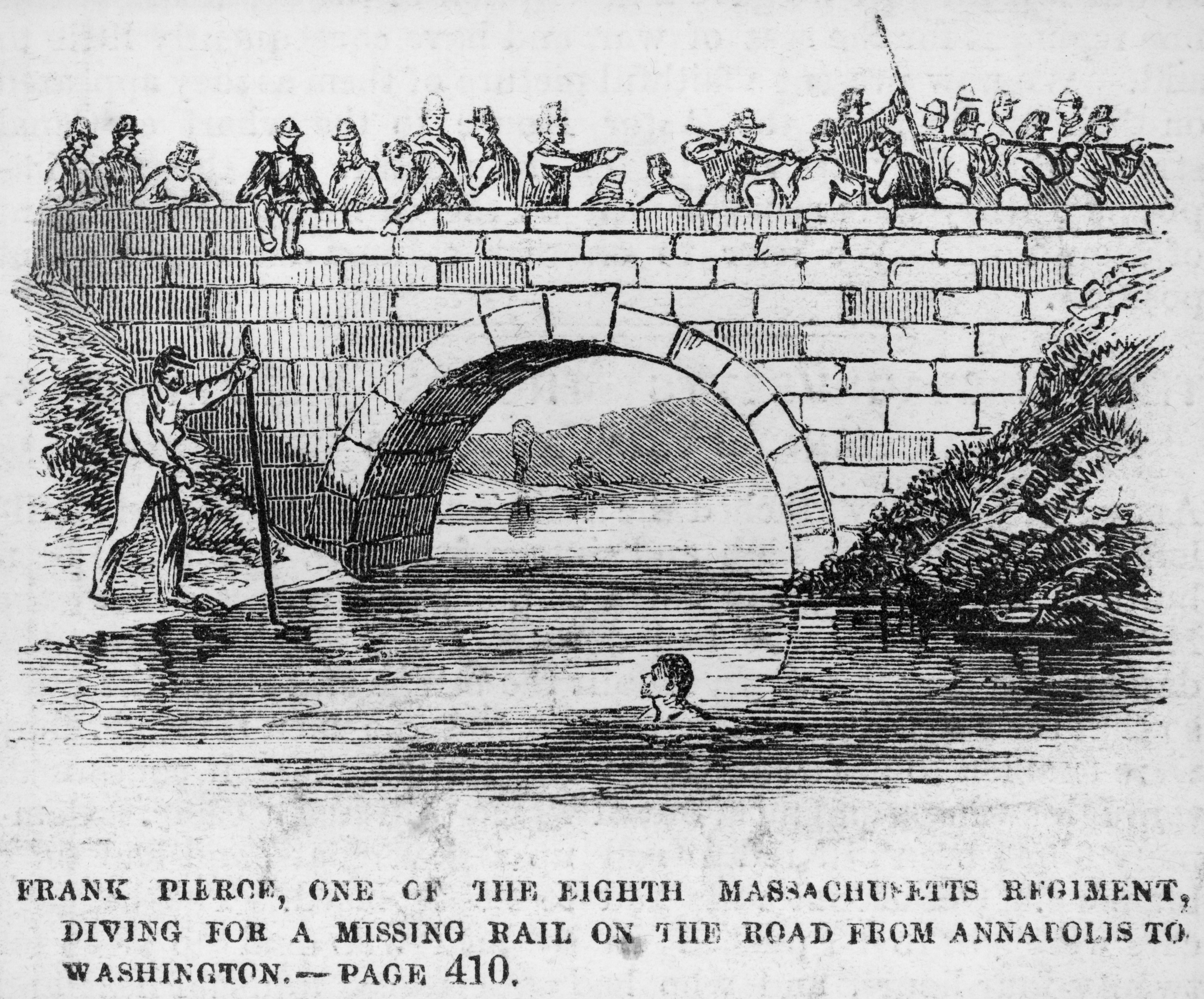
Frank Pierce, one of the 8th, diving for a missing rail on the road from Annapolis to Washington, Frank Leslie's Illustrated Newspaper

== See also ==
- Massachusetts in the Civil War
- List of Massachusetts Civil War units
