= John H. Robinson (Medal of Honor) =

- Born: 1846; Ireland
- Died: November 30, 1883 (aged 36-37); Boston, Massachusetts
- Burial place: Mount Benedict Cemetery, West Roxbury, MA
- Military career
- Allegiance: United States of America
- Branch: United States Army
- Rank: Private
- Units: Company I, 19th Massachusetts Infantry
- Conflicts: Battle of Gettysburg; American Civil War
- Awards: Medal of Honor

John H. Robinson (1846 – November 30, 1883) was an Irish soldier who fought with the Union Army in the American Civil War. Robinson received his country's highest award for bravery during combat, the Medal of Honor, for actions taken on July 3, 1863 during the Battle of Gettysburg.

== Civil War service ==
At the onset of the Civil War, Robinson joined with the 19th Massachusetts Infantry Regiment and was placed in Company I as a private. He fought in the Battle of Gettysburg, and on the third day of the battle helped repel the famed Pickett's Charge. During the fight, Robinson captured the enemy flag of the 57th Virginia Infantry, and for this action was awarded with the Medal of Honor.

== Medal of Honor citation ==
{{quotation|The President of the United States of America, in the name of Congress, takes pleasure in presenting the Medal of Honor to Private John H. Robinson, United States Army, for extraordinary heroism on 3 July 1863, while serving with Company I, 19th Massachusetts Infantry, in action at Gettysburg, Pennsylvania, for capture of flag of 57th Virginia Infantry (Confederate States of America).
