= Pine Grove Cemetery (Lynn, Massachusetts) =

- U.S. National Register of Historic Places
- U.S. Historic district
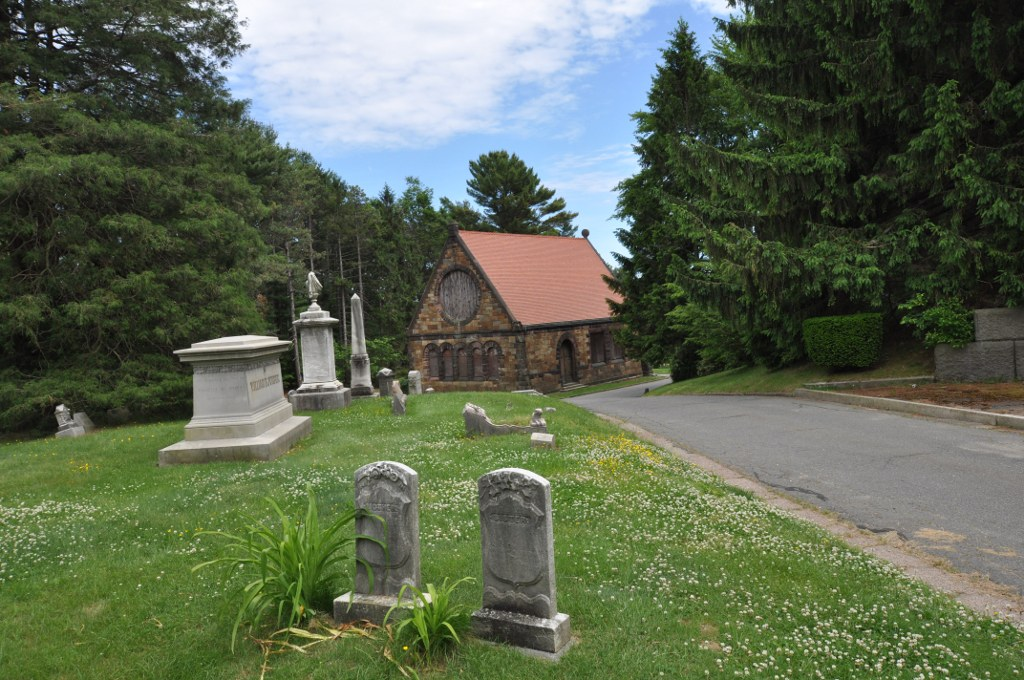
- The chapel

- Location within Massachusetts Location within the United States
- Location: Lynn, Massachusetts
- Coordinates: 42°28′39″N 70°57′44″W
- NRHP reference No.: 14000364
- Added to NRHP: June 27, 2014

Pine Grove Cemetery is a historic rural cemetery whose main entrance is on Boston Street in Lynn, Massachusetts. It was established in the mid-19th century and it consists of 82 developed acres. There are approximately 88,000 to 90,000 interments at the cemetery.

== History ==
It was originally established as a private cemetery in 1849, with a rural cemetery design by Henry A. S. Dearborn, designer of Mount Auburn Cemetery in Cambridge, Massachusetts. It was purchased by the city of Lynn in 1855. In 1930, a wall was built by the Works Progress Administration to surround the cemetery, and local legend says it is the “second-longest continuous stone wall in the world,” second only to the Great Wall of China. It is named for the plethora of pine trees surrounding Rhodes Memorial Chapel and the cemetery's entrance. The cemetery was listed on the National Register of Historic Places in 2014.

== Features and landmarks ==
Pine Grove Cemetery has many notable features and landmarks:

- The cemetery office building, erected in 1860.
- The Pine Grove Cemetery Receiving Tomb, constructed from 1866 to 1868. Built in a Ruskinian Gothic style, it was part of a building campaign following the Civil War. It is made of granite ashlar construction with a cast iron doorway.
- The Rhodes Memorial Chapel, built in 1890. It was built using a donation from a Ms. Amos Rhodes in a Richardsonian Romanesque style. The stained glass windows are valued at over $10,000.
- The Cemetery's greenhouse, whose operations have been noted throughout the country.

== Notable interments ==
- John G. B. Adams
- Harry Agganis
- Frank D. Allen
- John Alley
- Alice Ives Breed
- Daisy Davis
- Alonzo G. Draper, brigadier general during the American Civil War
- Benjamin Franklin Falls
- Barney Gilligan, early professional baseball player
- Henry Lovering
- Lydia Pinkham
- William Poole
- Elihu Thomson
- Charles Herbert Woodbury
- Holman K. Wheeler

== See also ==
- National Register of Historic Places listings in Lynn, Massachusetts
