= Benjamin Franklin Falls =

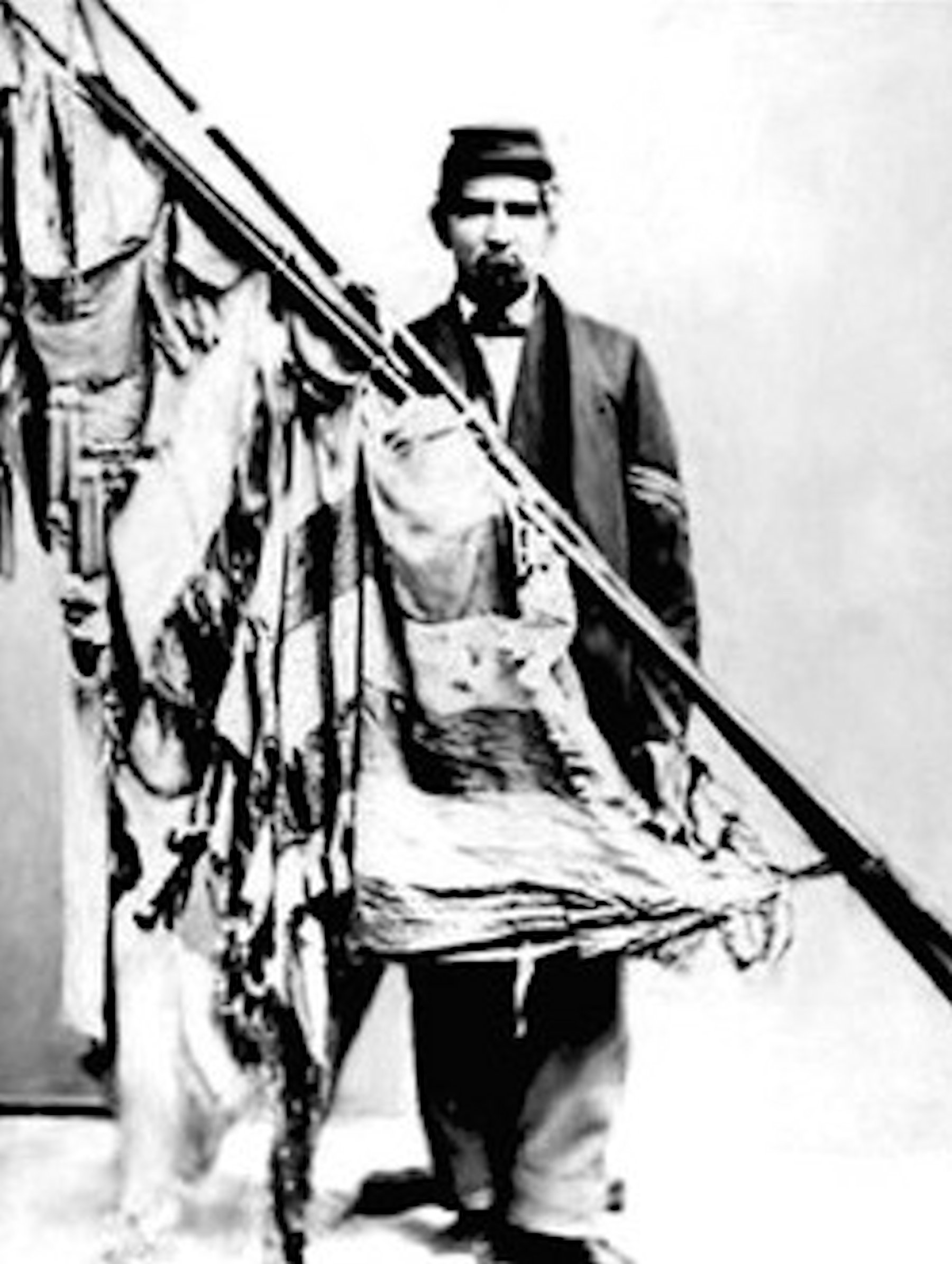
- Medal of Honor winner Benjamin Franklin Falls
- Born: July 1, 1824; Portsmouth, New Hampshire, US
- Died: May 12, 1864 (aged 39); Virginia
- Burial place: Pine Grove Cemetery, Lynn, Massachusetts
- Military career
- Allegiance: United States
- Branch: United States Army; Union Army
- Service years: 1861 - 1864
- Rank: Color Sergeant
- Units: Company A, 19th Massachusetts Volunteer Infantry Regiment
- Conflicts: American Civil War • Battle of Gettysburg
- Awards: Medal of Honor

Benjamin Franklin Falls (July 1, 1824 - May 12, 1864) was a Medal of Honor recipient, an honor he received for his actions during the American Civil War.

== Biography ==
Falls joined the 19th Massachusetts Volunteer Infantry from Lynn, Massachusetts in August 1861. He earned the Medal of Honor for his bravery during the third day of the Battle of Gettysburg, on July 3, 1863. He captured the color-bearer and colors of the 19th Virginia. His citation, awarded posthumously on December 1, 1864, simply reads, "capture of flag."

He was mortally wounded on May 10, 1864, during the Battle of Spotsylvania Court House, and died two days later. Following his death, he was interred at Pine Grove Cemetery in Lynn, Massachusetts.

== See also ==
- List of Medal of Honor recipients for the Battle of Gettysburg
- List of American Civil War Medal of Honor recipients: A–F
