= Owen A. Galvin =

American politician

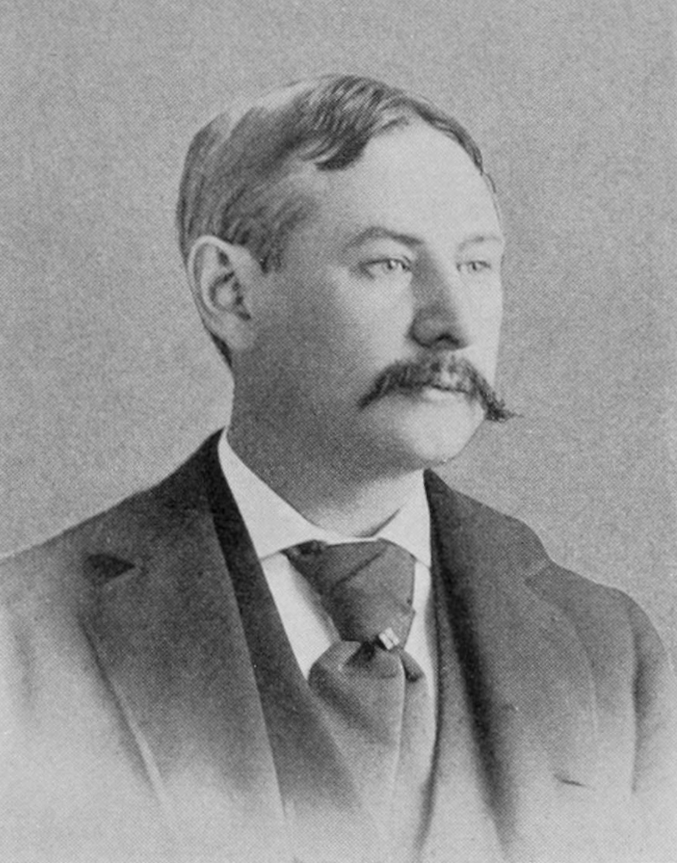

United States Attorney for the District of Massachusetts
- In office 1887–1890
- Preceded by: George M. Stearns
- Succeeded by: Frank D. Allen

Personal details
- Born: June 21, 1852 Boston, Massachusetts
- Died: December 18, 1897 (aged 45) Boston, Massachusetts
- Party: Democratic
- Education: Boston University School of Law
- Occupation: Attorney; Politician

Owen A. Galvin (1852–1897) was an American attorney and politician who served as the United States Attorney for the District of Massachusetts from 1887 to 1890 and was the Democratic Party nominee in the 1889 Boston mayoral election.

== Early life ==
Galvin was born on June 21, 1852, to Patrick and Mary (Hughes) Galvin. After attending Boston public schools, he studied law in the office of Charles F. Donnelly. He graduated from Boston University School of Law in 1876 and was admitted to the bar on February 29 of that year. On July 3, 1879, he married Jennie T. Sullivan. They would go on to have three sons, Stephen P. Galvin, Augustus H. Galvin, and Frederick S. Galvin.

== Massachusetts General Court ==
Galvin was elected to the Massachusetts House of Representatives in 1881. He served on the House's committees on education and constitutional amendments.

From 1882 to 1884 he was a member of the Massachusetts Senate. He served on the Senate's committees on liquor law, labor, education, judiciary, and election laws as well as on the special committee on penal and charitable institutions. In 1884 he was the Democratic candidate for President of the Massachusetts Senate.

== United States Attorney ==
In July 1886, Galvin was appointed by George M. Stearns to serve as the Assistant United States Attorney for the District of Massachusetts. When Stearns resigned in September 1887, Galvin was chosen by President Grover Cleveland to succeed him as United States Attorney for the District of Massachusetts. He resigned in October 1889, but his resignation was not accepted until May 1890.

== Later career ==
In 1889, Galvin was a candidate for Mayor of Boston. He won the Democratic nomination, but lost to Republican incumbent Thomas N. Hart.

In 1891 he was appointed by Governor William Russell to serve on the Charles River Improvement Commission, who named Galvin their chairman. The Commission's work led to the design initiatives of Charles Eliot, Arthur Shurcliff, and Guy Lowell. This designed landscape now includes over 20 parks and natural areas along 19 miles (31 km) of shoreline, from the New Dam at the Charlestown Bridge to the dam near Watertown Square.

In 1892 he unsuccessfully challenged incumbent Nathan Matthews, Jr. for the Democratic nomination for Mayor.

== Death ==
Galvin died on December 18, 1897, in Boston.

== See also ==
- 103rd Massachusetts General Court (1882)
