= Camp Stanton =

American Civil War training camp in Massachusetts

Coordinates: 42.5198°N 70.9989°W

Camp Edwin M. Stanton (usually known as just Camp Stanton) was an American Civil War training camp that existed from 1861 to 1862 in Lynnfield, Massachusetts. When the camp first opened in 1861 it was known as Camp Schouler, named for Massachusetts Adjutant General William Schouler. In some references it is misspelled as Camp Schuyler. After President Abraham Lincoln's call for 300,000 troops in July 1862, the camp was revived and renamed in honor of United States Secretary of War Edwin M. Stanton. It served as the training camp and rendezvous for recruits from eastern Massachusetts (recruits from western Massachusetts were sent to Camp Wool in Worcester, Massachusetts). The camp trained ten infantry regiments and four artillery batteries of the Massachusetts militia, including the 17th, 19th, 22nd, 23rd, 33rd, 35th, 38th, 39th, 40th, and 41st regiments of infantry and the 3rd, 5th, 9th, and 10th batteries of light artillery. Soldiers stationed at Camp Schouler/Stanton during training included Edward A. Wild, Henry Wilson, Nelson A. Miles, Edward Winslow Hinks, and Arthur F. Devereux. During World War I it was renamed Camp Houston and served as a Massachusetts National Guard mobilization camp in 1917. It was located on the Newburyport Turnpike (now part of U.S. Route 1) near the Peabody, Massachusetts line. The camp was divided into streets, with tents and cook houses located on both sides of the Turnpike to Suntaug Lake.

== See also ==
- List of military installations in Massachusetts
