= Frank D. Allen =

American attorney and politician

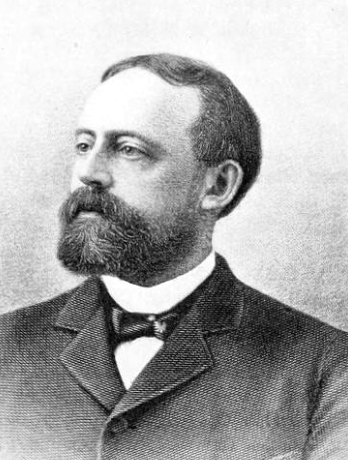

United States Attorney for the District of Massachusetts
- In office 1890–1893
- Preceded by: Owen A. Galvin
- Succeeded by: Sherman Hoar

Personal details
- Born: August 16, 1850 Worcester, Massachusetts
- Died: January 23, 1910 (aged 59) Boston, Massachusetts
- Resting place: Pine Grove Cemetery; Lynn, Massachusetts
- Party: Republican
- Spouse: Lucy (Rhodes) Allen
- Education: Yale College; Boston University School of Law
- Occupation: Attorney; Politician

Frank Dewey Allen (August 16, 1850 – January 23, 1910) was an American attorney and politician who served as a member of Massachusetts House of Representatives, the Massachusetts Governor's Council, and was the United States Attorney for the District of Massachusetts.

== Early life ==
Allen was born on August 16, 1850, in Worcester, Massachusetts, to Charles Francis Allen and Olive Ely (Dewey) Allen. He graduated from Yale College in 1873 and from the Boston University School of Law in 1875. He served as a clerk in the law office of Hillard, Hyde & Dickinson until 1878 when he was admitted to the Suffolk County bar.

After being admitted to the bar, opened his own law office in Boston.

On January 9, 1878, Allen married Lucy Rhodes of Lynn, Massachusetts.

== Political career ==
From 1881 to 1882, Allen served in the Massachusetts House of Representatives, representing the 10th Essex District with Hartwell French and Henry Cabot Lodge. He served on the judiciary committee, the congressional redistricting committee, and the committee on banks and banking, as well as serving on the committee that removed of Judge Joseph M. Day from office.

From 1884 to 1886 he was a member of the Massachusetts Republican state committee from the 1st Essex Senatorial District. He was also a member of the party's executive committee.

From 1886 to 1888, Allen was a member of the Massachusetts Governor's Council from the 5th Council District.

== Legal career ==
As an attorney, Allen argued on behalf of the Plymouth Woolen Company of the constitutionality of a law allowing municipal officers to permit manufacturers "to ring bells and use whistles and gongs for the benefit of their workmen."

As counsel for the Lancaster Bank, Allen was able to recover securities stolen from the bank's vaults.

From 1890 to 1893, Allen was the United States Attorney for the District of Massachusetts.

== Business career ==
In 1884 Allen organized the Massachusetts Temperance Home for Inebriates in Lynn. He served as the Home's president for many years.

From 1902 to 1905 he was a receiver at the Central National Bank of Boston. He was also the director of the Lynn Gas & Electric Co.

== Death ==
Allen died in Boston on January 23, 1910, and is buried in Pine Grove Cemetery in Lynn.
