= George M. Stearns =

American politician

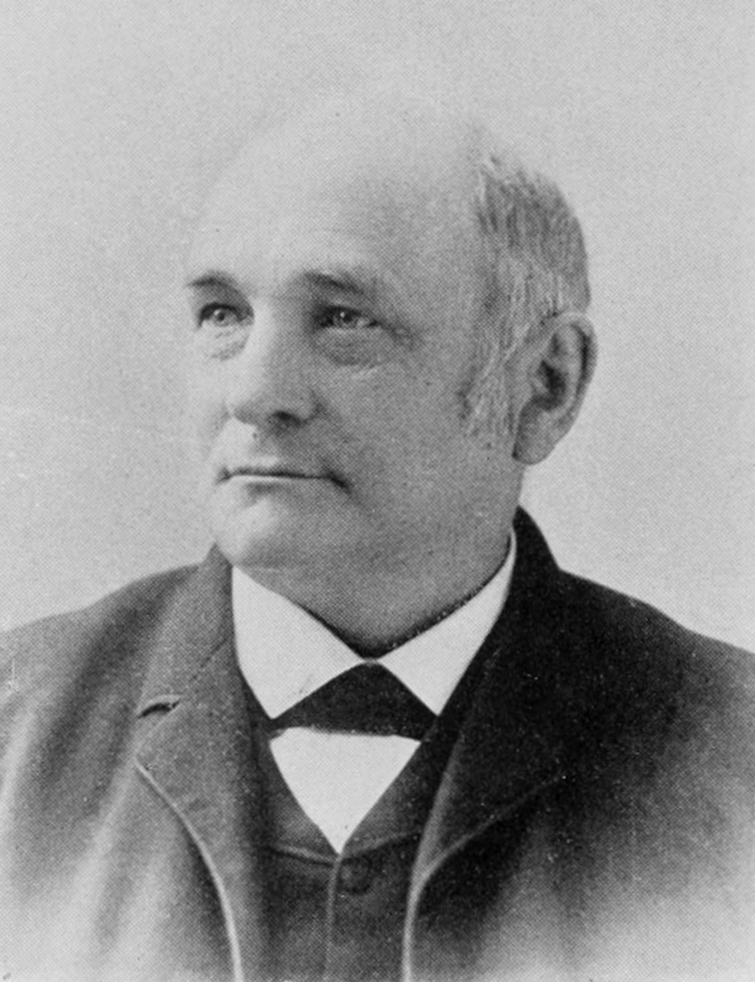

United States Attorney for the District of Massachusetts
- In office 1886–1887
- Preceded by: George P. Sanger
- Succeeded by: Owen A. Galvin

Personal details
- Born: April 18, 1831 Stoughton, Massachusetts
- Died: December 31, 1894 (aged 63) Brookline, Massachusetts
- Party: Democratic
- Occupation: Attorney; Politician

George Monroe Stearns (1831-1894) was an American attorney who served as the United States Attorney for the District of Massachusetts from 1886 to 1887.

== Early life ==
Stearns was born on April 18, 1831, in Stoughton, Massachusetts. He spent his early years in Rowe, Massachusetts, where his father was a clergyman at the local Unitarian Church.

== Legal career ==
After school, Stearns studied law in the office of John Wells in Chicopee, Massachusetts. He was admitted to the Hampden County bar on April 24, 1852, and soon thereafter became Wells' partner.

After Wells moved to Springfield, Massachusetts, Stearns continued to practice law in Chicopee for several years. He eventually moved to Springfield himself, where he practiced with E. D. Beach and later with Marcus Perrin Knowlton.

== Politics ==
In 1859, Stearns was a member of the Massachusetts House of Representatives. In 1860, he served on the Committee for the Revision of the Statutes.

In 1867 Stearns was the Democratic nominee for Lieutenant Governor of Massachusetts. He lost to Republican William Claflin 100,381 votes to 68,527.

In 1871, Stearns served in the Massachusetts Senate.

In 1872, Stearns was again the Democratic nominee for Lieutenant Governor. However, when gubernatorial nominee Charles Sumner declined to run, Stearns chose to do the same.

From 1872 to 1874, Stearns was the District Attorney of the Western District of Massachusetts.

He was a delegate to the 1872 Democratic National Convention, supporting Horace Greeley.

== United States Attorney ==
In February 1886, Stearns was appointed by President Grover Cleveland to serve as United States Attorney for the District of Massachusetts.

In 1887, he prosecuted Alexander Graham Bell on the grounds that Bell had used fraud and misrepresentation to obtain a patent. Bell won the case.

Stearns stepped down on August 31, 1887, citing ill health.

== Later life and death ==
In 1894, Stearns moved to Brookline, Massachusetts. The Hampden County Bar Association held a dinner in his honor before he left, but he was unable to attend due to ill health.

Stearns died on December 31, 1894, at his home in Brookline.

== Personal life ==
Stearns married Emily Goodnow on May 17, 1855, in Brooklyn. They had two daughters, Mary Caroline Stearns (1856–1876) and Emily Spaulding Stearns (1858–1870).

== See also ==
- 92nd Massachusetts General Court (1871)
