= Arthur F. Devereux =

United States Army general (1838–1906)

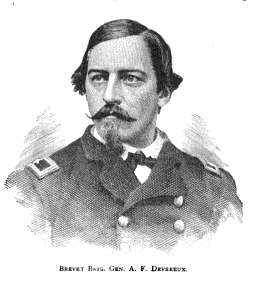
- Born: April 27, 1838; Salem, Massachusetts, US
- Died: February 13, 1906 (aged 67); Cincinnati, Ohio, US
- Burial place: Spring Grove Cemetery, Cincinnati, Ohio
- Military career
- Allegiance: United States; Union
- Branch: Union Army
- Service years: 1861 – 1864
- Rank: Colonel
- Commands: Salem Light Infantry company; 19th Regiment Massachusetts Volunteer Infantry; Second Brigade, Second Division, II Corps
- Conflicts: American Civil War
- Awards: Brevet Brigadier General
- Other work: Ohio state representative

Arthur Forrester Devereux (April 27, 1838 – February 13, 1906) was a captain in the Massachusetts Volunteer Militia prior to the Civil War and a colonel in the Union Army during the Civil War. He is notable for his expertise and proficiency in the instruction of military drill. During the Battle of Gettysburg, the 19th Massachusetts Infantry, under his command, played an important role in filling a breach in the Union lines during Pickett's Charge. After his active service had concluded, Devereux was awarded the honorary rank of brevet brigadier general, United States Volunteers, by appointment of President Andrew Johnson on February 21, 1866, to rank from March 13, 1865, and confirmation by the U.S. Senate on April 10, 1866.

== Early career ==
Born in Salem, Massachusetts, Devereux attended Harvard College and the United States Military Academy at West Point. His father was George H. Devereux who had served as adjutant general of Massachusetts from 1848 – 1851. His father's interest in military matters likely influenced Arthur Devereux's career. Devereux did not graduate from West Point, however, and instead moved to Chicago, Illinois, to pursue a career in business in 1854, when he was 15 or 16 years old.

=== Chicago ===
Soon after moving to Chicago, Devereux became business partners with a young man of his own age, Elmer E. Ellsworth. In business they were unsuccessful. Before long, Ellsworth would move on to a career in law and Devereux would move back to Massachusetts. However, as peacetime militia soldiers, they were both highly successful. Both Devereux and Ellsworth became involved in the Illinois National Guard. Devereux became adjutant to Illinois National Guard Maj. Simon Bolivar Buckner, later a Confederate general during the Civil War and eventually a governor of Kentucky. Both Devereux and Ellsworth were acutely interested in the Zouave method of drill, inspired by the French Army units of the same name which fought in North Africa and wore elaborate uniforms influenced by Algerian fashions. Zouave militia units in the United States wore similar uniforms to their French counterparts and emphasized precision and showmanship in their drill. Ellsworth formed a Zouave company known as the Chicago Cadets which was placed under Adjutant Devereux's supervision. The two men frequently consulted with each other on the practice of precision Zouave drill.

=== Salem Light Infantry company ===
Returning to Massachusetts in 1855, Devereux was eventually elected captain of the Salem Light Infantry company in 1859. The Salem Light Infantry company was a Massachusetts militia unit with a long history, having been established in 1805. Inspired by Ellsworth's Chicago Cadets, Devereux enhanced the Salem company's prestige by transforming it into a Zouave unit and training its members in precision drill. In 1860, the company gave an exhibition drill for Massachusetts Gov. John Andrew and a large crowd of distinguished guests. The Salem Light Infantry was declared "a marvel of precision and exactness."

== Civil War ==
=== 8th Massachusetts ===
After the Battle of Fort Sumter on April 12, 1861, the Salem Light Infantry company was assigned to the 8th Regiment Massachusetts Volunteer Infantry for three months of service. The regiment arrived in Annapolis, Maryland, on April 21. Almost immediately after their arrival, the Salem Light Infantry, designated Company J of the 8th Massachusetts, was ordered aboard the USS Constitution to protect the vessel from attack by Confederate sympathizers. At the time, the Constitution was serving as a training ship at the United States Naval Academy in Annapolis. As one of the original six frigates of the U.S. Navy, the warship was an important national symbol. The Navy soon towed the Constitution, with Devereux's Salem company on board, to New York City where she would be less vulnerable to those seeking to destroy the Union in order to preserve slavery. Returning to Maryland, Devereux and his company rejoined the 8th Massachusetts, aiding in repairing railroads and serving guard duty outside of Baltimore. The 8th Massachusetts was mustered out of service on August 1, 1861.

=== 19th Massachusetts ===
Having completed his first term of service, Devereux immediately sought involvement with a new regiment. On August 22, 1861, he was commissioned lieutenant colonel of the 19th Massachusetts. The commanding officer of the regiment, Col. Edward Winslow Hinks had great respect for Devereux's expertise in military drill. He therefore placed the training of the 19th Massachusetts under Devereux's supervision. To prepare the regiment for action, Devereux enlisted the aid of several members of the Salem Light Infantry company to serve as drill masters.

After their first winter of service on picket duty in the vicinity of Washington, D.C., the 19th Massachusetts was attached to the 3rd Brigade, 2nd Division, of the II Corps in the Army of the Potomac. Devereux was placed on sick leave just before the Seven Days Battles and therefore missed the unit's first severe action. The unit was involved in the Second Battle of Bull Run on August 30, 1862. During the Battle of Antietam on September 17, 1862, the 19th Massachusetts, as part of Maj. Gen. John Sedgwick's division, took part in an infamous charge on Confederate lines in the West Woods. The division was virtually surrounded by Confederates and suffered heavy casualties. Devereux was wounded during this action. Hinks suffered a severe wound at Antietam which required his extended absence from the army. In his place, Devereux took command of the 19th Massachusetts. Devereux's promotion to colonel was effective November 29, 1862.

Devereux and the 19th Massachusetts played a significant role in the Battle of Gettysburg on July 3, 1863. Confederate forces attempted a massive frontal assault on the Union position known as Pickett's Charge. The attack only managed to breach Union lines in one small place along Cemetery Ridge. The spot is now referred to as the "high-water mark" of the Confederacy, not only because it was the furthest position reached by Confederate troops during the charge but also because the failure of Pickett's Charge is regarded as the major turning point of the Civil War. The 19th Massachusetts happened to be one of several Union infantry regiments positioned at the high-water mark. The regiment had been placed slightly to the south of the "copse of trees" which served as the target of the Confederate units during the charge. The 19th Massachusetts was in line with the 42nd New York. The two units were the second line of defense in their brigade.

As the Confederate charge struck the Union position, a gap in the Union line opened in front of the 19th Massachusetts between their brigade and the adjacent brigade commanded by Alexander S. Webb. Seeing the break, Devereux turned to the colonel of the 42nd New York and, gesturing to the gap said, "Mallon, we must move!" At that moment, Winfield Scott Hancock rode by and Devereux called out to Hancock, "They have broken through! Shall I get in there?" To which Hancock replied, "Go at them!" The 19th Massachusetts and the 42nd New York together filled the gap, entering a pandemonium of hand-to-hand combat. In the brutal fighting, the 19th Massachusetts captured four Confederate regimental flags which Devereux personally delivered to his brigade commander after the battle.

Following the Battle of Gettysburg, Devereux was detached from the regiment to assist in the draft service in Massachusetts. During the fall of 1863, he was in command of the garrison at Camp Wightman on Long Island in Boston Harbor.

=== Brigade command ===
Returning to the Army of the Potomac in November 1863, Devereux was placed in command of the Second Brigade, Second Division, II Corps. In that capacity, he was selected to lead a dangerous charge during the planning of the Battle of Mine Run on November 30, 1863. Fortunately, the attack was called off.

Devereux was forced to resign his command on February 27, 1864, according to historian James Bowen, due to, "imperative family considerations." Devereaux was nominated by President Andrew Johnson on February 21, 1866, for the award of the honorary grade of brevet brigadier general, U.S. Volunteers, to rank from March 13, 1865, for gallant services during the war and the U.S. Senate confirmed the award on April 10, 1866.

== Family and post-war life ==
About the time of his resignation in 1864, Devereux married Clara Anna Rich of Haverhill, Massachusetts. They had three sons and four daughters.

Arthur Devereux went back to a business career after the war, first in Boston, then in New York and eventually settling with his wife and children in Cincinnati, Ohio. In Ohio, Devereux became a representative in the Ohio legislature (known as the Ohio General Assembly). His wife, Clara, pursued a career in journalism, writing editorials and a social column for the Cincinnati Commercial Gazette, among other publications, and became one of the best-known woman journalists of her time. In the latter decades of the 19th century, the Devereux family played a key role in defining the elite social circles of Cincinnati. In 1894, Clara Devereux published Mrs. Devereux's Blue Book of Cincinnati, a social register of notable residents of that city. She was assisted by their daughter, Marion, who later took up her mother's mantle and wrote an influential social column during the early 20th century which, according to a more recent journalist, "made Cincinnati aristocrats quake for 29 years."

Arthur Devereux died on February 13, 1906, and is interred in Spring Grove Cemetery in Cincinnati.

== See also ==
- List of Massachusetts generals in the American Civil War
- Massachusetts in the American Civil War
