= 3rd Battalion Massachusetts Rifles =

- Country: United States of America
- Allegiance: Union
- Branch: Union Army
- Type: Infantry

Commanders
- Notable commanders: Major Charles Devens

The 3rd Battalion Massachusetts Rifles was an infantry unit created at the start of the American Civil War and activated for federal service in the Union army for a term of ninety days. It consisted of three companies of prewar militia and one newly recruited company together organized under the command of Major (later Brevet Major General) Charles Devens. The term "rifles" was a designation frequently given to antebellum militia companies which trained in the use of rifled muskets—a relatively new innovation at the time—as opposed to smoothbore muskets. Only minor differences in training and tactics differentiated such units from a typical infantry company of the time. During the 1840s, "rifle" companies were often expected to train and serve as skirmishers in open order, however by the Civil War, United States army tactics manuals made no distinction between a company of "rifles" and a typical infantry company.

The organization of the battalion began on April 19, 1861 in response to Abraham Lincoln's call for 75,000 volunteer troops at the start of the war. When they departed, the 3rd Battalion completed the required quota from Massachusetts under that initial call. For most of its term, the battalion served garrison duty at Fort McHenry in Baltimore. They did not see combat. The unit returned to Massachusetts and was mustered out on August 3, 1861. Two of its members died of disease.

== Unit organization ==
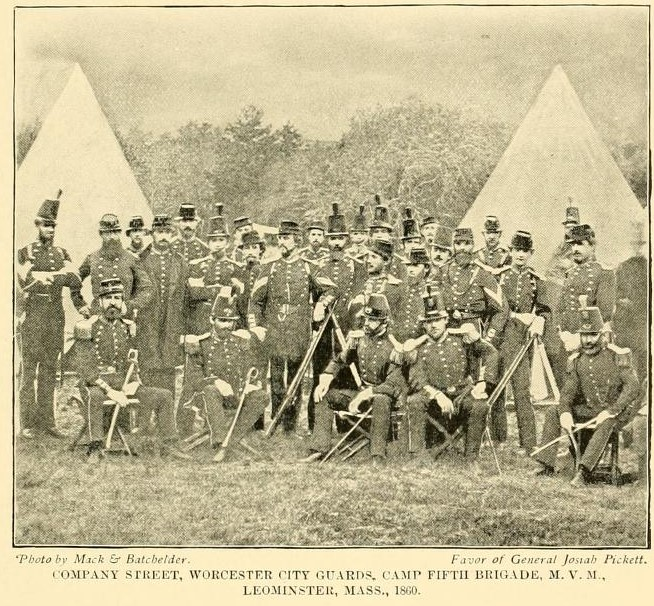
Members of the Worcester City Guards, a company of Massachusetts Militia, in 1860

At the start of the Civil War, the 3rd Battalion consisted of three militia companies headquartered in Worcester, Massachusetts. On April 19, 1861, one week after Confederate forces fired on Fort Sumter, Major Devens ordered his battalion to assemble in Worcester to prepare for active service. On April 20, the three companies formed up in front of Worcester City Hall. The same day, Devens received orders from Governor John Andrew to depart for Washington, D.C.

The "Worcester City Guards" made up Company A of the battalion. The unit was formed in 1840 as part of the Massachusetts militia. The circumstances leading to its creation arose from local political tensions arising out of the election of 1840 as the older Worcester Light Infantry company split along party lines. Those who belonged to the Whig Party left the older group to form the Worcester City Guards. At the start of the Civil War, the company was commanded by Captain Augustus R. B. Sprague.

The "Holden Rifles" of Holden, Massachusetts formed Company B. The unit was established in 1856 and at the start of the war was commanded by Captain Joseph H. Gleason. The "Emmett Guards" of Worcester formed Company C. The unit was organized in 1858 and commanded by Captain Michael McConville. Company D was recruited in Boston beginning on April 19, 1861. In a single day, the company had enough volunteers to fill out its roster. Captain Albert Dodd, who oversaw the recruiting, served as the company commander and the company became known as "Dodd's Rifles."

The three Worcester County companies departed by train from Worcester on April 20. They arrived at Annapolis, Maryland on April 24 and remained there until May 2 when they were transferred to Fort McHenry. The Boston company departed on May 2 aboard the steamship Cambridge and arrived in Washington via the Potomac River. It was the first troop transport ship to reach Washington via the Potomac in response to Lincoln's call for troops. The company spent twelve days in Washington and then joined the rest of the battalion at Fort McHenry. The battalion was then mustered into United States service at Fort McHenry on May 9.

== Wartime service ==
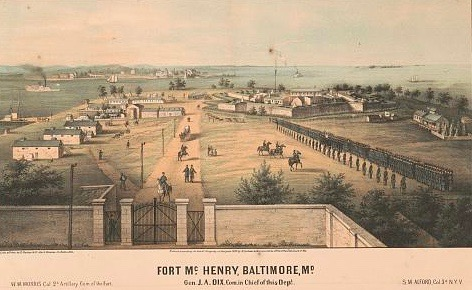
Fort McHenry in 1861

While serving as garrison at Fort McHenry, the battalion drilled in infantry maneuvers and trained to operate the heavy artillery of the fort. Men of the 3rd Battalion also periodically took part in patrols down the Chesapeake Bay. Their duty was described as heavy and the men suffered from overwork. Though they never took part in combat, the unit also suffered greatly from illness, particularly during July. Two members of the battalion died of disease.

At the close of the 90-day term, the battalion was asked by Major General John Adams Dix to remain at Fort McHenry for another two weeks due to a shortage of garrison troops. Though twelve men decided to return home at the end of their term, the great majority of the battalion remained another two weeks at Fort McHenry as requested. They departed for home on July 29 via railroad and arrived in Worcester on August 2. They were mustered out of service on August 3, 1861.

== See also ==
- Massachusetts in the Civil War
- List of Massachusetts Civil War units
