= Edward Winslow Hincks =

American politician

Edward W. Hincks
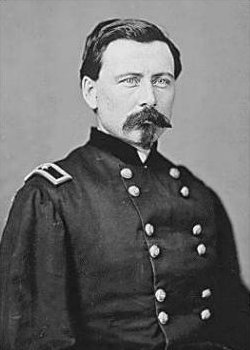
- Maj. Gen. Edward Hincks
- Born: May 30, 1830; Bucksport, Maine
- Died: February 14, 1894 (aged 63); Cambridge, Massachusetts
- Burial place: Mount Auburn Cemetery, Cambridge, Massachusetts
- Military career
- Allegiance: United States of America; Union
- Branch: United States Army; Union Army
- Service years: 1861-1870
- Rank: Brigadier General; Brevet Major General
- Commands: 3rd Division, XVIII Corps; Army of the Potomac
- Conflicts: American Civil War; Battle of Ball's Bluff; Seven Days Battles; Battle of Glendale; Battle of Antietam; Bermuda Hundred Campaign; Siege of Petersburg

Edward Winslow Hincks (May 30, 1830 – February 14, 1894) was a career United States Army officer who served as a brigadier general during the American Civil War.

== Early life ==
Hincks was born in Bucksport, Maine. His name, spelled correctly, is "Hincks", but the "C" was deleted when he joined the U.S. Army in 1861, and he resumed using the original spelling in 1871 after he retired from the service. He was a printer for the Whig and Courier newspaper in Bangor, Maine. He moved to Boston, Massachusetts in 1849. Hincks was involved in the printing and publishing business. He served in the Massachusetts House of Representatives in 1855. He also served on the Boston City Council in 1855.

== Civil War ==
In 1861, Hincks received a regular army commission as a second lieutenant in the 2nd U.S. Cavalry, but was soon after offered a volunteer commission as colonel of the 19th Regiment Massachusetts Volunteer Infantry.

Hincks saw service at Ball's Bluff, the Peninsula Campaign, and at Glendale, where he was wounded. He returned to his regiment for the Maryland Campaign, but was seriously wounded at Antietam on September 17, 1862.

He received a promotion to brigadier general of volunteers, to rank from November 29, 1862, by nomination of President Abraham Lincoln on March 4, 1863, confirmation by the U.S. Senate on March 9, 1863, and appointment by the President on April 4, 1863. He spent the next two years on court martial and recruiting duty. In March through May 1864, he commanded the prison camp at Camp Lookout, Maryland before being assigned to command the 3rd Division of the XVIII Corps, composed entirely of United States Colored Troops, led by white officers. He was one of the leaders of the unsuccessful First Battle of Petersburg and served in the Siege of Petersburg. When the division was rolled into the XXV Corps, Hincks was sent north to perform recruitment duties and to enforce the draft. On December 3, 1867, President Andrew Johnson nominated Hincks for the award of the honorary grade of brevet major general, United States Volunteers, to rank from March 13, 1865, and the U.S. Senate confirmed the award on May 4, 1866. On December 3, 1867, President Johnson nominated Hincks for the award of the honorary grade of brevet brigadier general in the regular army, to rank from March 2, 1867, for his service at Petersburg The U.S. Senate confirmed the award on February 14, 1868.

== Postbellum career ==
After the war, he remained in the army as the lieutenant colonel of the 40th U.S. Infantry Regiment before retiring at the rank of colonel in December 1870. After he retired, he served as governor of the National Military Home for Disabled Veterans in Hampton, Virginia (1870–73) and in Milwaukee, Wisconsin (1873–80).

Hincks died in Cambridge, Massachusetts, and is buried in Mount Auburn Cemetery Cambridge, Massachusetts. His grave can be found on the Eglantine Path, Lot 1636.

== See also ==
- List of American Civil War generals (Union)
- List of Massachusetts generals in the American Civil War
- Massachusetts in the American Civil War
- Other white officers in other USCT regiments: Walter Thorn, Thornton Chase, William Gould (W.G.) Raymond
