= Thaddeus S. Smith =

American Medal of Honor soldier (1847–1933)

- Born: May 13, 1847; Cumberland County, Pennsylvania, US
- Died: March 14, 1933 (aged 85); Port Townsend, Washington, US
- Burial place: Laurel Grove Cemetery
- Military career
- Allegiance: United States
- Branch: Union Army
- Rank: Corporal
- Units: Company E, 6th Pennsylvania Reserve Regiment
- Conflicts: American Civil War • Battle of Gettysburg
- Awards: Medal of Honor

Thaddeus Stevens Smith (May 13, 1847 – March 14, 1933) was a soldier from Pennsylvania who fought for the Union in the American Civil War. He received the United States' highest medal for bravery during combat, the Medal of Honor, for his actions during the Battle of Gettysburg on 2 July 1863. He was issued the medal on 5 May 1900.

== Early life ==
Smith was born May 13, 1847, in Cumberland County, Pennsylvania and was one of six children born to Henry and Elizabeth Smith and one of five boys.

== Military service ==
When the American Civil War broke out, Smith enlisted into Company E, 6th Pennsylvania Reserve Regiment (also known as the 35th Pennsylvania Volunteer Infantry).

=== Medal of Honor action ===
On the second day of fighting in the Battle of Gettysburg, Union forces had been forced to fall back due to the superior numbers of the opposing Confederate force. As more Union troops arrived to fight, however, the battle started to shift. In an area known as Devil's Den, Smith, along with J. Levi Roush, John W. Hart, George Mears, Chester S. Furman and Wallace Johnson volunteered to attack a small log cabin being held by Confederate forces. Although they attempted to approach the cabin by stealth, they were spotted and began taking fire from the enemy force locked inside. Smith and the other men rushed through the enemy fire and forced their way into the cabin. Before they could start shooting, the Confederate soldiers surrendered and were taken back to Union lines as prisoners. For their actions during this incident, all six men received the Medal of Honor.

=== Incarceration at Andersonville Prison ===
On May 31, 1864, Smith was transferred to Company E, 191st Pennsylvania Infantry. Corporal Smith was captured August 19, 1864 by Confederate forces at Weldon Railroad, Virginia and sent to Andersonville Prison, a Confederate prisoner-of-war camp.

Andersonville Prison was commanded by Captain Henry Wirz, who, after the war, was tried and executed for war crimes related to his command of the prison. Those held in Andersonville faced brutal and unsanitary conditions, including an inadequate water supply, overcrowding and reductions of food rations, ultimately leading to the deaths of nearly 13,000 Union troops. Andersonville held approximately 45,000 Union prisoners over the course of its operation, and by the time Smith arrived in August 1864, Andersonville held 33,000 prisoners concurrently, the most held at any one time during the prison's existence.

Although Smith managed to escape once, he was recaptured and returned to Andersonville, where he remained a prisoner of war for the next seven months until Union forces freed him on March 2, 1865.

Two months later Smith was released from military service.

== Later life ==
After the war, Smith returned to Pennsylvania, where he met and married his wife, Joanna C. Hinkel, and together they had a daughter, whom they named Blanche.

He died March 14, 1933, in Port Townsend, Washington, and is buried in Laurel Grove Cemetery.

== Medal of Honor citation ==
Was 1 of 6 volunteers who charged upon a log house near the Devil's Den, where a squad of the enemy's sharpshooters were sheltered, and compelled their surrender.

== See also ==
- List of American Civil War Medal of Honor recipients: Q–S
- List of Medal of Honor recipients for the Battle of Gettysburg
