= George Mears =

American soldier

George Washington Mears
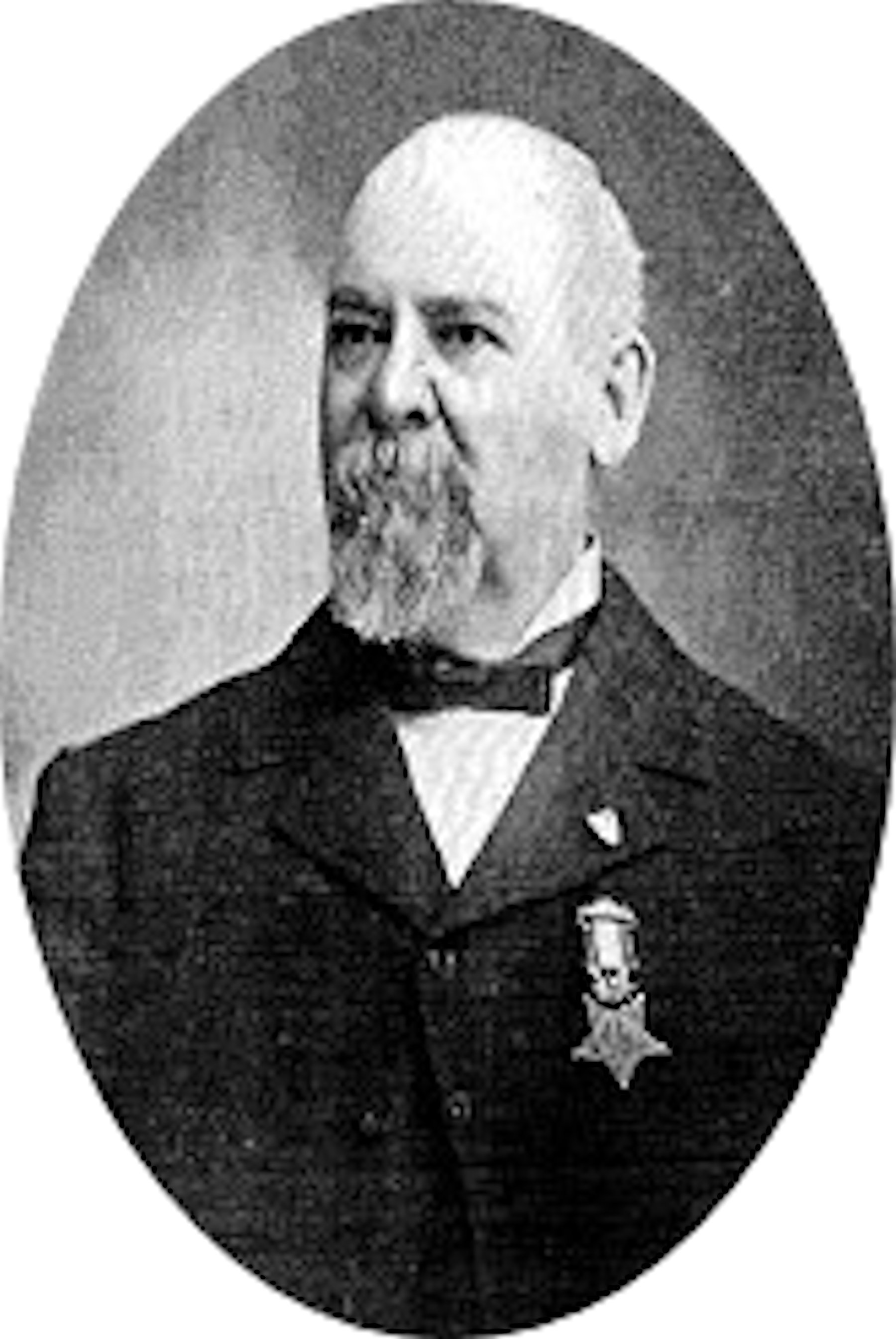
- George Washington Mears 1910
- Born: January 3, 1843; Bloomsburg, Pennsylvania, US
- Died: November 24, 1921 (aged 78); Bloomsburg, Pennsylvania, US
- Military career
- Allegiance: United States
- Branch: US Army
- Rank: Sergeant
- Units: Company A, 6th Pennsylvania Reserve Regiment
- Conflicts: Battle of Gettysburg; American Civil War
- Awards: Medal of Honor

George Mears (January 3, 1843 – November 24, 1921) was an American soldier who fought with the Union Army in the American Civil War. Mears received his country's highest award for bravery during combat, the Medal of Honor, for actions taken on July 2, 1863, during the Battle of Gettysburg.

== Civil War service ==
At the onset of the American Civil War, Mears enlisted into Company A of the 6th Pennsylvania Reserve Regiment out of Harrisburg, Pennsylvania. This regiment was also known as the 35th Pennsylvania Infantry.

On the second day of the Battle of Gettysburg, Union forces had been forced to fall back due to the superior numbers of the opposing Confederate force. As more Union troops arrived to fight however the battle started to shift. In a swampy area west of the John Weikert Farm, Mears, along with Thaddeus S. Smith, John W. Hart, J. Levi Roush, Chester S. Furman and Wallace Johnson volunteered to attack a small log cabin being held by Confederate forces. Although they attempted to approach the cabin by stealth, they were spotted and began taking fire from the enemy force locked inside. Mears and the other men rushed through the enemy fire and forced their way into the cabin. Before they could start shooting the Confederate soldiers surrendered and were taken back to Union lines as prisoners. For their actions during this incident, all six men received the Medal of Honor.

After Gettysburg, Mears fought in the Battle of New Hope Church where he lost his arm.

== Medal of Honor citation ==
The President of the United States of America, in the name of Congress, takes pleasure in presenting the Medal of Honor to Sergeant George W. Mears, United States Army, for extraordinary heroism on 2 July 1863, while serving with Company A, 6th Pennsylvania Reserves, in action at Gettysburg, Pennsylvania. With five volunteers Sergeant Mears gallantly charged on a number of the enemy's sharpshooters concealed in a log house, captured them, and brought them into the Union lines.

== Personal life ==
Following the war, Mears married Mary Appleman with whom he had seven children.

Mears was the first Morse code telegraph operator in Central Pennsylvania, and for fifty years was an employee of the Delaware, Lackawanna and Western Railroad.
