= J. Levi Roush =

American soldier

James Levi Roush
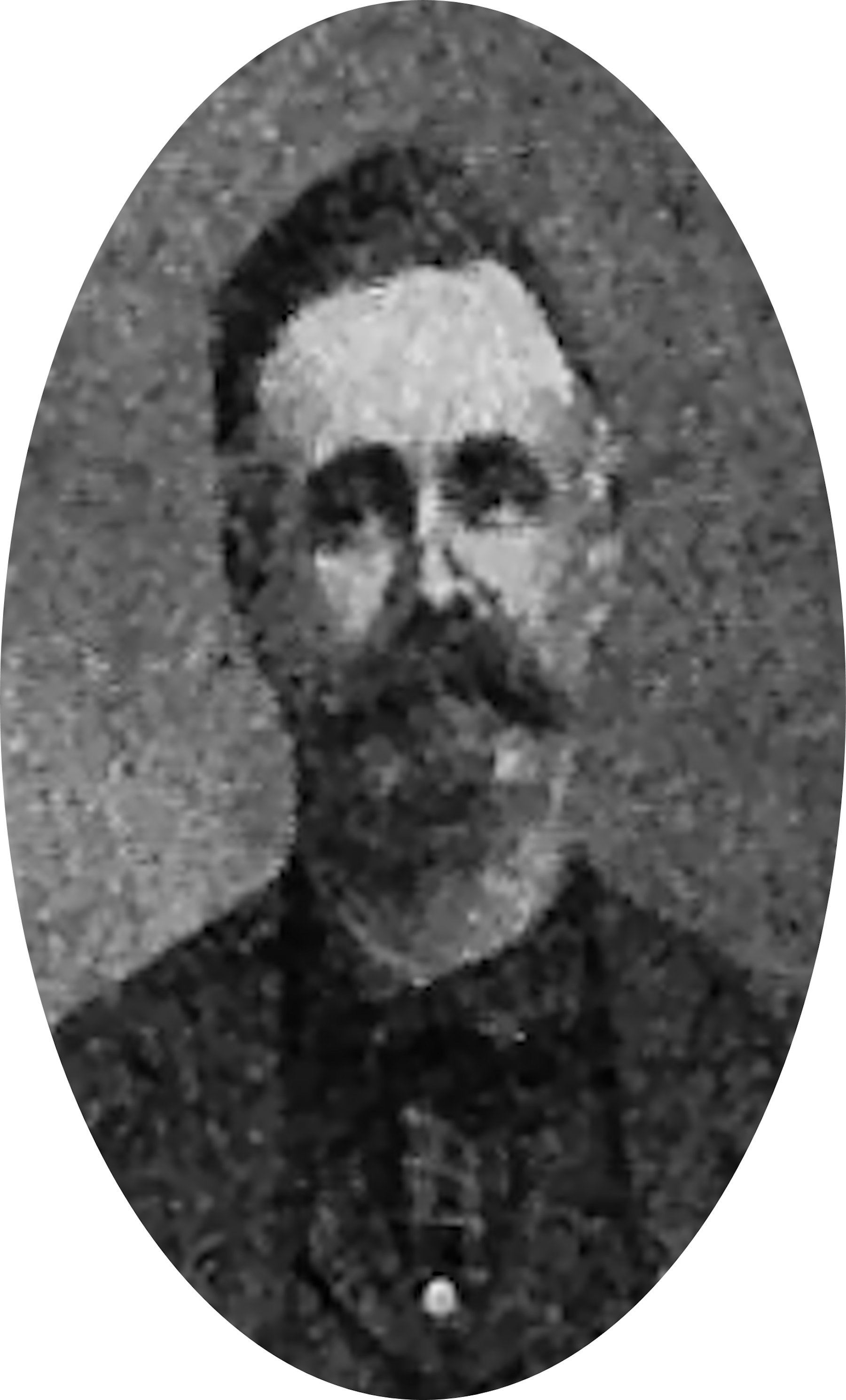
- Born: February 1, 1838; Chambersburg, Pennsylvania, US
- Died: February 12, 1906 (aged 68); McKees Gap, Pennsylvania, US
- Burial place: Saint Patrick's Cemetery, Newry, Pennsylvania
- Military career
- Allegiance: United States
- Branch: US Army
- Rank: Corporal
- Units: Company D, 6th Pennsylvania Reserve
- Conflicts: Battle of Gettysburg; American Civil War
- Awards: Medal of Honor

J. Levi Roush (February 1, 1838 – February 12, 1906) was an American soldier who fought with the Union Army in the American Civil War. Roush received his country's highest award for bravery during combat, the Medal of Honor, for actions taken on July 2, 1863, during the Battle of Gettysburg.

== Civil War service ==
At the onset of the American Civil War, Roush enlisted into Company D of the 6th Pennsylvania Reserve Regiment out of Chambersburg, Pennsylvania. This regiment was also known as the 35th Pennsylvania Infantry.

Roush fought in many battles of the Civil War including the Second Battle of Bull Run, where he sustained a gunshot wound to the face, the Battle of Malvern Hill, Battle of White House Landing, Battle of South Mountain, Battle of Antietam, Battle of Fredericksburg, Battle of Gettysburg, Battle of North Anna, Battle of Spotsylvania Courthouse, and several others.

On the second day of the Battle of Gettysburg, Union forces had been forced to fall back due to the superior numbers of the opposing Confederate force. As more Union troops arrived to fight however the battle started to shift. In an area known as Devil's Den, Roush, along with Thaddeus S. Smith, John W. Hart, George Mears, Chester S. Furman and Wallace Johnson volunteered to attack a small log cabin being held by Confederate forces. Although they attempted to approach the cabin by stealth, they were spotted and began taking fire from the enemy force locked inside. Roush and the other men rushed through the enemy fire and forced their way into the cabin. Before they could start shooting, the Confederate soldiers surrendered and were taken back to Union lines as prisoners. For their actions during this incident, all six men received the Medal of Honor.

Roush left the service with an honorable discharge on June 11, 1864.

== Medal of Honor citation ==
The President of the United States of America, in the name of Congress, takes pleasure in presenting the Medal of Honor to Corporal James Levi Roush, United States Army, for extraordinary heroism on 2 July 1863, while serving with Company D, 6th Pennsylvania Reserves, in action at Gettysburg, Pennsylvania. Corporal Roush was one of six volunteers who charged upon a log house near the Devil's Den, where a squad of the enemy's sharpshooters were sheltered, and compelled their surrender.

== Personal life ==
Following the war, Roush married Mary Wertzbarger with whom he had eight children.

Roush died on February 12, 1906, in McKees Gap, Pennsylvania. He was buried in Saint Patricks Cemetery.
