= 4th Pennsylvania Infantry Regiment =

Union Army unit in the American Civil War

4th Regiment, Pennsylvania Volunteer Infantry
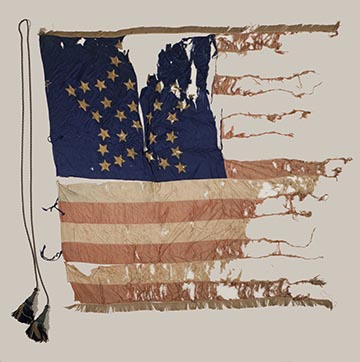
- National color of the 4th Pennsylvania Infantry Regiment, later carried by the 51st Pennsylvania Infantry Regiment
- Active: April 20 – July 27, 1861
- Country: United States
- Allegiance: Union
- Branch: Union Army
- Type: Infantry
- Size: 39 officers and 756 men (at muster-in)
- Engagements: Bull Run campaign

Commanders
- Notable commanders: John F. Hartranft

The 4th Pennsylvania Infantry Regiment, officially known as the 4th Regiment, Pennsylvania Volunteer Infantry, was an infantry regiment of the Union Army in the American Civil War. Formed mostly from a militia unit in Norristown in southeastern Pennsylvania, the regiment enlisted at the beginning of the American Civil War in April 1861 for a three-month period of service under the command of Colonel John F. Hartranft. Logistical difficulties bedeviled the regiment, which served as part of the garrison of Washington, D.C., until late June, when it was sent into Northern Virginia to join in the army of Brigadier General Irvin McDowell.

The regiment suffered its only combat casualties in a picket action on June 30 and was sent back to be mustered out on the eve of the First Battle of Bull Run owing to disagreement among the men over remaining with the army after the expiration of their term of service. Its men were denounced as cowards for being members of the only regiment to refuse to fight at the July 21 battle. Hartranft and a company commander remained with the army and later received the Medal of Honor for their actions at Bull Run. Many men of the regiment went on to serve in new Pennsylvania regiments, forming the bulk of the 51st Pennsylvania Infantry, which fought for the rest of the war.

== History ==
=== Formation ===
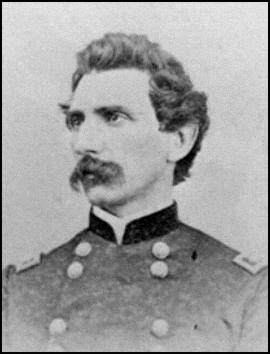
Hartranft photographed later in the war

The 4th Pennsylvania Infantry Regiment was formed from the 1st Regiment of the 2nd Brigade of the 2nd Division of the Pennsylvania State Militia, organized under the Militia Act of 1858. The militia unit included six companies based in Norristown, Pennsylvania. President Abraham Lincoln called for 75,000 men to serve in the army for three months after Confederate forces began the American Civil War by firing on Fort Sumter, and in response a mass meeting was held at the Odd Fellows Hall in Norristown on April 16. To encourage enlistment, resolutions promising assistance to the families of men who volunteered were passed. The officers of the militia regiment offered their services the next day to state Governor Andrew Gregg Curtin, who stipulated that the regiment report to the state capital of Harrisburg in four days.

The officers of the militia regiment began enlisting recruits, and by the time the regiment was mustered in on April 20, about 600 men from Montgomery County had joined. Popular enthusiasm for the war meant that there was no shortage of volunteers. After being presented with flags sewn by women of the town and given a send-off from the population, the Norristown companies moved to Harrisburg by rail and entered Camp Curtin the same day. The officers of the regiment initially planned to remain there until the regiment could be strengthened to the required ten companies from Montgomery County recruits, but due to the urgent need of the state for units they were ordered to form the 4th Pennsylvania with the addition of companies that had arrived in Camp Curtin from other counties. With this order, the regiment became a volunteer unit in federal service, and its men held an election to confirm the militia officers in their positions. John F. Hartranft remained colonel, Edward Schall lieutenant colonel, and Edwin Schall major. When it was mustered in on that day, the regiment numbered 39 officers and 756 men.

Companies of the 4th Pennsylvania
Company	Militia designation	Recruited at (city, county)
A	Wayne Artillerists	Norristown, Montgomery
B	Norris City Rifles	Norristown, Montgomery
C	Madison Guards	Pottstown, Montgomery
D	National Artillery, Company B	Norristown, Montgomery
E	Keystone Rifles	Norristown, Montgomery
F	Delaware County Union Rifles	Media, Delaware
G	Lewisburg Infantry	Lewisburg, Union
H	Eagle Guards	Bellefonte, Centre
I	National Artillery, Company A	Norristown, Montgomery
K	Norris City Rifles, Company B	Norristown, Montgomery

=== Garrison duty in Maryland and Washington ===
The 4th Pennsylvania quickly received marching orders after finishing its organization and departed for Philadelphia by rail on April 21. The regiment left Camp Curtin without the uniforms and equipment they were supposed to receive and only had as much ammunition as its men could carry in their pockets. At Philadelphia, the regiment was ordered by Major General Robert Patterson to report to Colonel Charles P. Dare of the 23rd Pennsylvania. With one company of the 23rd and the entire 4th, Dare moved by rail to Perryville, Maryland, to take control of the town and prevent a surprise Confederate attack. The next day, Patterson immediately ordered the regiment to Washington. As the regiment could not pass through Baltimore at the time due to the unrest of the Baltimore riot, its officers requested Dare to provide a steamer to bring the regiment to Annapolis. Still, he only allowed half of the regiment to depart as he felt wary of the risk of attack. Hartranft led the half regiment sent to Annapolis, where they were billeted in the Naval Academy buildings there. The other half, under the command of Major Schall, was left at Perryville for a week before it embarked aboard steamers to rejoin the regiment at Annapolis.

While at Annapolis on April 28, the 4th Pennsylvania received clothing that its men were not issued before their hasty departure from Camp Curtis. The blouses and pants that they received, provided to the state by war-profiteering contractors, were "made of damaged goods of inferior quality," as observed by industrialist Benjamin Haywood, dispatched by Curtin to investigate after widespread complaints. The state accordingly changed its uniform suppliers and had the original contractors prosecuted for fraud. The 4th Pennsylvania would not receive new uniforms from the state until June. After two weeks at Annapolis, the regiment arrived at the capital on May 8; Captain William J. Bolton of Company A wrote in his diary that it was met at the railway depot by a large crowd expecting to find a "splendid equipped regiment". Instead, Bolton described his unit as a "sorry set of looking objects": without knapsacks, their clothes were carried in dirty blankets on their backs. A lack of tents prevented the regiment from going into camp. It was instead billeted in the Assembly Rooms on Louisiana Avenue and the nearby Trinity Church. The resulting close quarters resulted in disease becoming rampant. When the regiment received tents, it encamped two miles from the city near Bladensburg. At the camp, it began regular drilling and inspections after receiving the necessary equipment.

=== Bull Run campaign ===
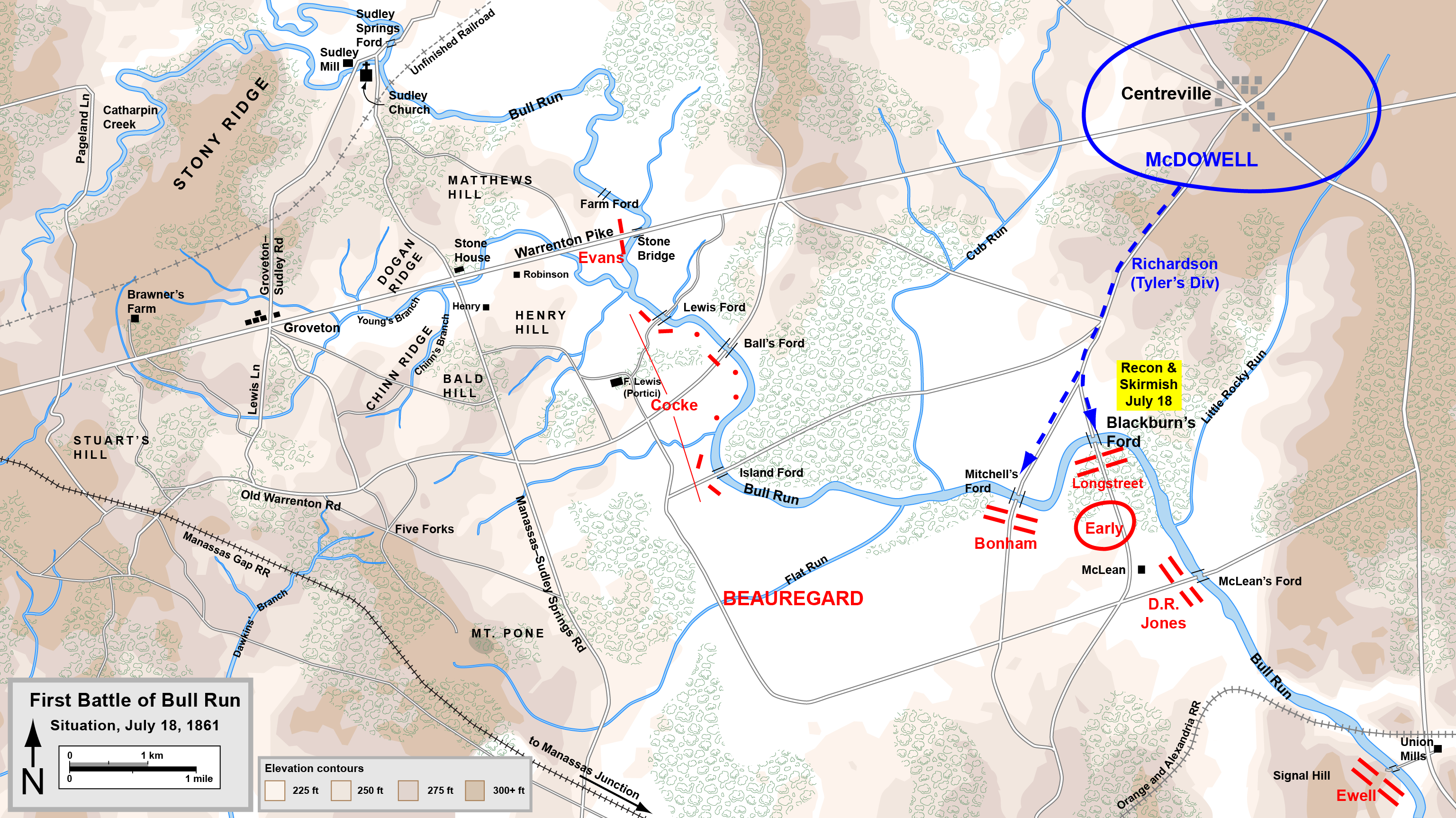
Situation on July 18, 1861

The 4th Pennsylvania was sent to Alexandria, Virginia, where it was encamped on Shuter's Hill at a site named Camp Hale, in readiness for a Confederate attack, on June 20. At 02:00 on June 30, three soldiers of the regiment on picket duty under the command of a second lieutenant from Company B on the Old Fairfax Road were attacked by a superior Confederate force that they repulsed, killing one Confederate. Three other pickets from Company E, attempting to rescue the original three, also engaged the Confederates, losing one killed and another severely wounded.

In preparation for an advance, baggage deemed unnecessary was sent to the rear, along with knapsacks and overcoats. The regiment became part of the Colonel William B. Franklin's 1st Brigade of Samuel P. Heintzelman's 3rd Division of the Army of Northeast Virginia, which was commanded by Brigadier General Irvin McDowell. The other regiments of the brigade, which was supported by Rickett's Battery, were the 5th Massachusetts, the 11th Massachusetts, and the 1st Minnesota. In the preliminary movements of the Bull Run campaign, the division left camp on the Old Fairfax Road, arriving at Sangster's Station late on July 18. That day they heard firing from the Battle of Blackburn's Ford, and the next day the regiment encamped with McDowell's army at Centreville.

...a body of men appeared on the road, with their backs towards Centrevile and their faces towards Alexandria. Their march was so disorderly that I could not have believed they were soldiers in an enemy's country...but for their arms and uniform...they were all in good spirits, but with an air about them I could not understand...I asked an officer "Where are your men going, sir?" "Well, we're going home, sir, I reckon, to Pennsylvania."..."I suppose there is severe work going on behind you, judging for the firing?" "Well, I reckon, sir, there is." "We're going home", he added, after a pause, during which it occurred to him, perhaps, that the movement required explanation, "because the men's time is up. We've had three months of this work".

— William H. Russell in a newspaper account

As the 4th Pennsylvania's three-month term of enlistment expired on July 20, the soldiers of the regiment spent that day discussing whether they should remain with the army or return to Pennsylvania. McDowell sought to keep the regiment with the army for the upcoming battle, promising that the regiment would not have to serve more than two more weeks, but also stated that those who did not wish to continue their service would be sent to the rear. The appeals of McDowell and Hartranft to patriotic duty were partially successful: many in the regiment were willing to stay, but others wanted to muster out as scheduled due to their previous negative experiences with lack of equipment. The latter felt that they were entitled to a rest as they planned to reenlist in new three-year units, to be organized by officers of the regiment. Preferring not to send the 4th Pennsylvania into battle understrength with only the men who wished to remain, McDowell, who considered the repulse at Blackburn's Ford the cause of the discord, decided to send the entire regiment to be mustered out. Hartranft and Captain Walter H. Cooke of Company K stayed with the army, serving on the staffs of Franklin's brigade and David Hunter's division, respectively. Cooke, after finding that only a half dozen of his men stepped forward to fight in response to his question, left in disgust and initially started for the camp of the New York Fire Zouaves to serve as a private before being told he could be more useful with the staff of a unit. Both Hartranft and Cooke distinguished themselves during the First Battle of Bull Run and were awarded the Medal of Honor in the late 1880s.

On July 21, as the First Battle of Bull Run began, the 4th Pennsylvania remained in the rear; it and Varian's New York Battery of the 8th New York Infantry were the only three-month units to refuse to fight in the battle. That morning, the regiment struck camp and marched back to Camp Hale under the command of Lieutenant Colonel Schall. Several witnesses reported its departure, ensuring that its actions would be widely denounced. On its way to the rear, the regiment was derided by Ambrose Burnside's brigade and fleeing civilians. The 4th Pennsylvania was not in unanimous agreement on departing, Corporal Joseph K. Corson of Company K later recounting that he was ashamed of marching away from the sound of the guns, and that others felt similarly. Journalist William H. Russell acknowledged that "perhaps the Fourth Pennsylvania were right, but let us hear no more of the excellence of three months' service volunteers". At Camp Hale, the regiment was mustered out of federal service the next day and after arriving at Washington on July 23, it proceeded to Harrisburg via rail to be mustered out of state service on July 27. The companies of the 4th Pennsylvania returned to their hometowns, the Norristown units coming back to a "hearty welcome" from the locals.

== Subsequent service and lineage ==
Many men of the regiment subsequently reenlisted in new three-year regiments, forming the bulk of the 51st Pennsylvania Infantry commanded by Hartranft, which mustered into service in November 1861. The 51st Pennsylvania fought for the rest of the war, carrying the flag of the 4th Pennsylvania into battle at many major engagements including South Mountain, Antietam, Cold Harbor and the Crater. Hartranft continued as colonel of the 51st, rising to brigade and division command in 1864 and 1865. Major Edwin Schall became lieutenant colonel of the 51st and was killed at Cold Harbor. Another officer who continued his service with the 51st was the first lieutenant of Company H, William H. Blair, who was brevetted brigadier general for his actions in the storming of Burnside's Bridge at Antietam.

The captain of Company C, John R. Brooke, recruited and became the colonel of the 53rd Pennsylvania which included Company C, the Madison Guards, as its Company A. The 53rd, which began organizing in late September 1861, also went on to serve for the rest of the war with the Army of the Potomac. Company A Private George Morton Randall joined the Regular Army in the fall of 1861 and rose to major general after the war. Corson returned to Norristown to finish his medical studies, interrupted by his service in the 4th Pennsylvania, and afterwards became assistant surgeon of the 6th Pennsylvania Reserves, receiving the Medal of Honor for his actions at the Battle of Bristoe Station.

The Headquarters Company of the 1st Battalion, 111th Infantry Regiment of the Pennsylvania Army National Guard perpetuates the lineage of Company B (the Norris City Rifles).

== See also ==
- List of Pennsylvania Civil War regiments
- Pennsylvania in the Civil War

== Bibliography ==
- Bates, Samuel P. (1869). History of Pennsylvania volunteers, 1861–5. Vol. I. Harrisburg: State Printer. OCLC 16043577.
- Bolton, William J. (2000). Sauers, Richard A. (ed.). The Civil War Journal of Colonel William J. Bolton. Conshohocken, Pennsylvania: Combined Publishing. ISBN 1-58097-039-7.
- Dyer, Frederick H. (1908). A Compendium of the War of the Rebellion. Des Moines: Dyer Publishing Company. OCLC 8697590.
- Heitman, Francis B. (1903). Historical Register and Dictionary of the United States Army. Vol. I. Washington, D.C.: Government Printing Office. OCLC 1200947.
- Sauers, Richard A. (1987). Advance the Colors!: Pennsylvania Civil War Battle Flags. Vol. 1. Harrisburg: Pennsylvania Capitol Preservation Committee. ISBN 9780818200908.
