= John W. Hart =

American Civil War soldier from Maryland

- Born: July 30, 1833; Germany
- Died: June 2, 1907 (aged 73); Cumberland, Maryland
- Burial place: Saint Lukes Lutheran Cemetery
- Military career
- Allegiance: United States of America
- Branch: Union Army
- Rank: Sergeant
- Units: Company D, 6th Pennsylvania Reserve Regiment
- Conflicts: American Civil War • Battle of Gettysburg
- Awards: Medal of Honor

John William Hart (July 30, 1833 – June 2, 1907) was a soldier from Maryland who fought in the American Civil War. He received the United States' highest medal for bravery during combat, the Medal of Honor, for his actions during the Battle of Gettysburg on 2 July 1863. He was issued the medal on 3 August 1897.

== Biography ==
Hart was born July 30, 1833, in Germany but migrated to the United States and settling in Maryland prior to the American Civil War. Hart enlisted into Company D, 6th Pennsylvania Reserves (also known as the 35th Pennsylvania Infantry) in Cumberland, Maryland.

On the second day of fighting in the Battle of Gettysburg Union forces had been forced to fall back due to the superior numbers of the opposing Confederate force. As more Union troops arrived to fight however the battle started to shift. In an area known as Devil's Den, John Hart, along with Thaddeus S. Smith, J. Levi Roush, George Mears, Chester S. Furman and Wallace W. Johnson volunteered to attack a small log cabin being held by Confederate forces. Although they attempted to approach the cabin by stealth, they were spotted and began taking fire from the enemy force locked inside. Hart and the other men rushed through the enemy fire and forced their way into the cabin. Before they could start shooting the confederate soldiers surrendered and were taken back to Union lines as prisoners. For their actions during this incident, all six men received the Medal of Honor.

After the war, Hart returned to Maryland, married his wife Christina and had five children, three boys and two girls.

He died June 2, 1907, in Cumberland, Maryland, and is buried in Saint Lukes Lutheran Cemetery. When his wife Christina died in 1926, she was buried with him.

== Medal of Honor citation ==
Was one of six volunteers who charged upon a log house near the Devil's Den, where a squad of the enemy's sharpshooters were sheltered, and compelled their surrender.

== See also ==
- List of American Civil War Medal of Honor recipients: G–L
- List of Medal of Honor recipients for the Battle of Gettysburg
- 6th Pennsylvania Reserve Regiment
- Battle of Gettysburg
