= Wallace W. Johnson =

American medal of honor recipient (1842–1911)

Wallace Johnson
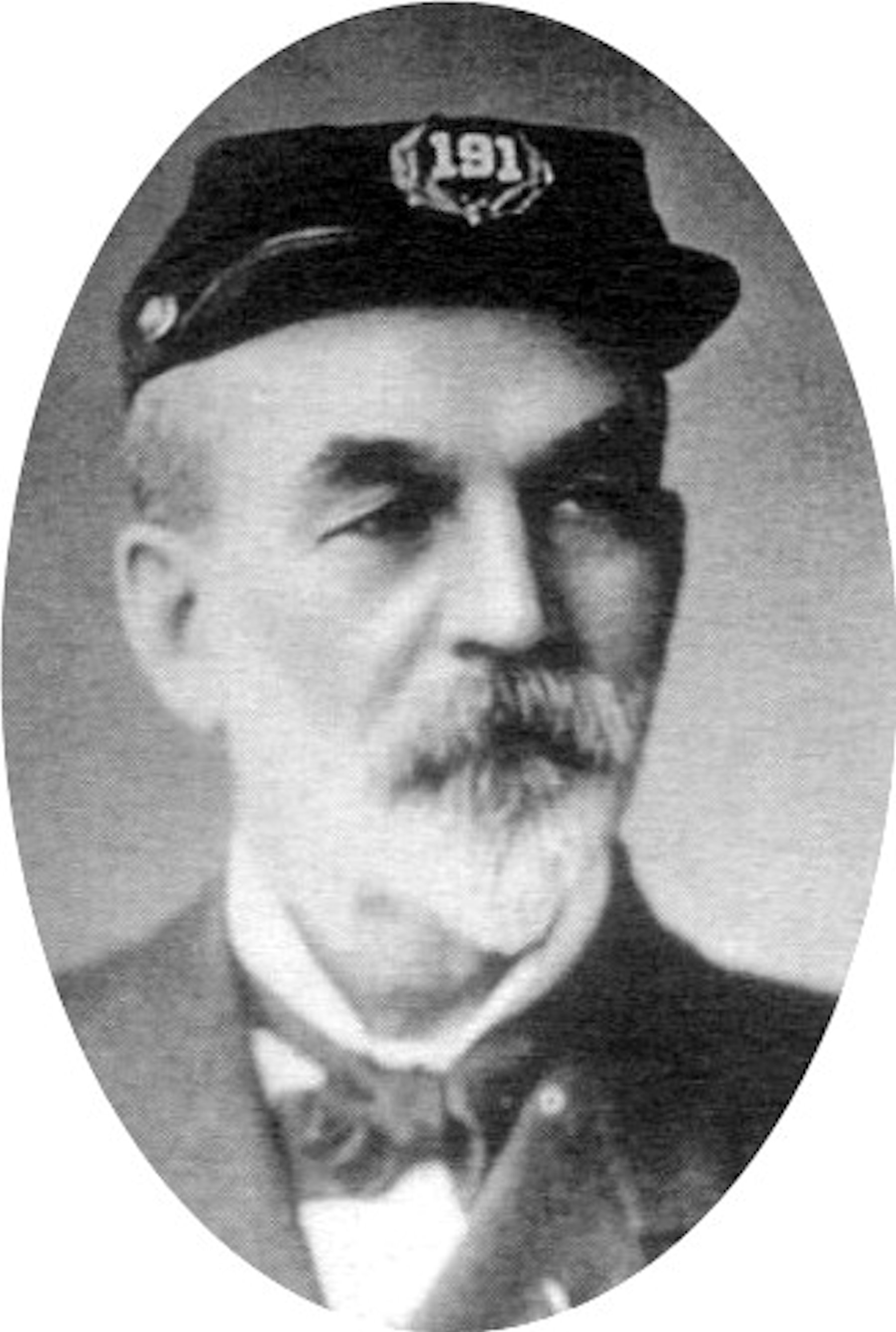
- Born: December 30, 1842; Newfield, New York, U.S.
- Died: December 30, 1911 (aged 69); Berks County, Pennsylvania, U.S.
- Burial place: West Laurel Hill Cemetery, Bala Cynwyd, Pennsylvania, U.S.
- Military career
- Allegiance: United States of America
- Branch: Union army
- Rank: Sergeant
- Units: Company G, 6th Pennsylvania Reserve Regiment
- Conflicts: American Civil War • Battle of Gettysburg
- Awards: Medal of Honor

Wallace Wisner Johnson (December 30, 1842 – December 30, 1911) was an American soldier in the Union army during the American Civil War. He received the United States' highest medal for bravery during combat, the Medal of Honor, for his actions during the Battle of Gettysburg 2 July 1863. He was issued the medal on 8 August 1900.

== Biography ==
Johnson was born December 30, 1842, in Newfield, New York. At the start of the American Civil War, he enlisted into Company G, 6th Pennsylvania Reserve Regiment (also known as the 35th Pennsylvania Infantry) at Waverly, New York.

During the Battle of Gettysburg, second day, Union forces had been forced to fall back due to the superior numbers of the opposing Confederate force. As more Union troops arrived to fight however the battle started to shift. In an area "near the Devil's Den", Johnson, along with J. Levi Roush, John W. Hart, George Mears, Chester S. Furman and Thaddeus S. Smith volunteered to attack a small log cabin being held by Confederate forces. Although they attempted to approach the cabin by stealth, they were spotted and began taking fire from the enemy force locked inside. Johnson and the other men rushed through the enemy fire and forced their way into the cabin. Before they could start shooting the confederate soldiers surrendered and were taken back to Union lines as prisoners. Subsequent research has shown that the actual location of the event took placed in the area referred to as the Valley of Death rather than the Devil's Den.

Johnson was mustered out of the military June 11, 1864, in Harrisburg, Pennsylvania.

In August 1896, 40 veterans from the 6th Pennsylvania Reserve Regiment petitioned the United States Secretary of War to consider George Mears for the Medal of Honor for his role in coordinating the attack party. Mears was not the only one worthy of the award, however the regiment struggled to recall who else was in the attack party. Mears and others remembered Furman, Hart, and Roush, and they received the Medal of Honor six months after Mears. Johnson came forward three years later and acknowledged his role in the attack. He was awarded the Medal of Honor on August 8, 1900. Smith was awarded the Medal of Honor later for his role in the attack. Johnson's medal is held at the Gettysburg Museum and Visitor Center.

Johnson died December 30, 1911, in Berks County, Pennsylvania. He was interred at West Laurel Hill Cemetery in Bala Cynwyd, Pennsylvania.

== Medal of Honor citation ==
With five other volunteers gallantly charged on a number of the enemy's sharpshooters concealed in a log house, captured them, and brought them into the Union lines.

== See also ==
- List of American Civil War Medal of Honor recipients: G–L
- List of Medal of Honor recipients for the Battle of Gettysburg
