= John R. Brooke =

Union Army general and governor of Puerto Rico

John Rutter Brooke
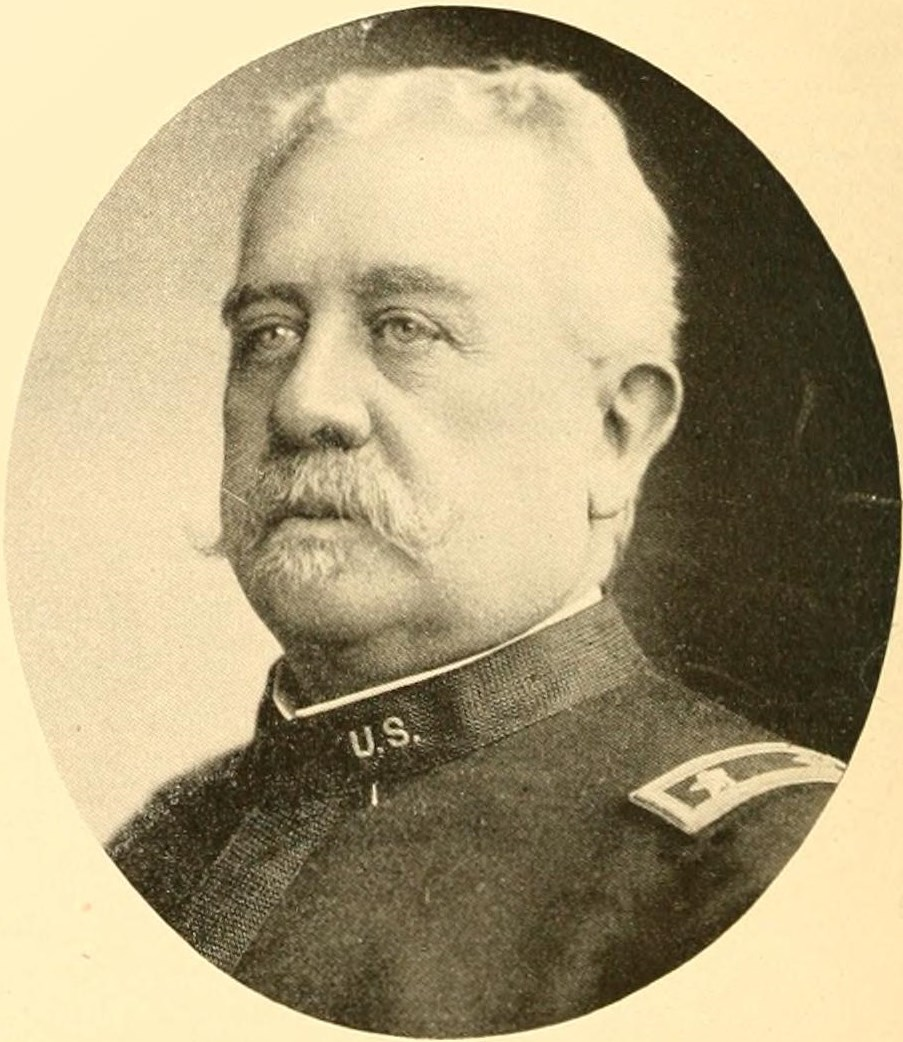

Military Governor of Cuba
- In office December 13, 1898 – December 23, 1899
- Succeeded by: Leonard Wood

Military Governor of Puerto Rico
- In office October 18, 1898 – December 6, 1898
- Preceded by: Nelson Appleton Miles
- Succeeded by: Guy Vernor Henry

Personal details
- Born: July 21, 1838 Pottstown, Pennsylvania, US
- Died: September 5, 1926 (aged 88) Philadelphia, Pennsylvania, US
- Resting place: Arlington National Cemetery

Military service
- Allegiance: United States of America; Union
- Branch/service: United States Army; Union Army
- Years of service: 1861–1902
- Rank: Major General
- Battles/wars: American Civil War; Battle of Antietam; Battle of Chancellorsville; Battle of Gettysburg (WIA); Overland campaign; Battle of Spotsylvania Court House; Battle of Cold Harbor (WIA); American Indian Wars; Spanish–American War

John Rutter Brooke (July 21, 1838 – September 5, 1926) served as Military Governor of Puerto Rico, Military Governor of Cuba, and was one of the last surviving generals of the American Civil War when he died aged 88.

== Early life ==
Brooke was born in Pottstown, Pennsylvania, and was educated in nearby Collegeville and West Chester.

== Civil War ==
Brooke's military career began when he joined the 4th Pennsylvania Infantry with the rank of captain in April 1861. In August, he became colonel of the newly raised 53rd Pennsylvania Infantry and served in the 1862 Peninsula Campaign.

He temporarily commanded a brigade during the Battle of Antietam in September of that year. In May 1863, he was given permanent command of a brigade of the 1st Division of the II Corps, which he led in the Battle of Chancellorsville and during the Gettysburg campaign.

On the second day of the Battle of Gettysburg, July 2, 1863, Brooke found himself in the thick of the action when Confederate lieutenant general James Longstreet launched his assault against the Union lines south of Gettysburg. Rushed into action as reinforcements by Maj. Gen. Winfield Hancock, Colonel Brooke launched a limited counterattack against oncoming Confederate forces with his brigade in the Wheatfield. Although he was knocked out of action with a severe wound, his men temporarily stopped the Confederates and stabilized the Union line long enough to prevent a breakthrough.

After recovery, Brooke subsequently also fought in the Overland Campaign, including the Battle of Spotsylvania Court House and other battles. He was promoted to brigadier general of volunteers on May 12, 1864. General Brooke was critically wounded, again, at Cold Harbor in June. Brooke led a division in western Virginia late in the war. He was promoted to brevet major general in the volunteer army on August 1, 1864, for his service at Totopotomoy and Cold Harbor, and to brevet brigadier general in the regular army on March 2, 1867, for Spotsylvania Court House.

== Later life ==
In 1866, Brooke accepted a commission as the lieutenant colonel of the 37th U.S. Infantry of the regular army. Thirteen years later, he was given the position of colonel of the 13th U.S. Infantry, serving on the frontier in various posts.

In 1888, he was promoted to brigadier general and was in command of the Department of the Platte when the Ghost Dance began in 1890. He was ordered by General Nelson Miles to rush the 7th U.S. Cavalry up to Wounded Knee. He left this command in 1895.

In 1897, he was promoted to major general in the Regular Army and assigned to command the First Corps during the Spanish–American War. In Puerto Rico, he landed in Arroyo with General Hains, and reached Guayama by the time the armistice was signed. When General Miles left the island in October 1898 to return to the United States, Brooke became military governor and head of the army of occupation in the U.S. military government. On December 6, Brooke was replaced by General Guy Vernor Henry, and by December 13, was named to the same position in Cuba.

General Brooke was a member of the Military Order of the Loyal Legion of the United States (Companion #02434) and served as its national commander-in-chief from 1905 to 1907. He was also a member of the Minnesota Society of Colonial Wars and the Military Order of Foreign Wars.

General Brooke retired from the Army on July 21, 1902, in Philadelphia, where he lived until his death at age 88 in 1926. He is buried at Arlington National Cemetery.

== Personal life ==
In 1863, Brooke married Louisa H. Roberts of Warwick, Pennsylvania. She died in 1867, and in 1877 he married Mary L. Stearns, the daughter of Governor Onslow Stearns. With his first wife, Brooke was the father of two sons, William and Louis.

== Honors ==
The troop transport USS General J. R. Brooke (AP-132), launched February 1943, was named in his honor. The former U.S. Army military post in San Juan, P.R., which encompassed El Morro Castle was named Fort Brooke in his honor.

== See also ==
- List of American Civil War generals (Union)

== Notes ==
Military offices
| Preceded by Nelson Appleton Miles (Commandant) | Military Governor of Puerto Rico; 1898 | Succeeded by Guy Vernor Henry |
| Preceded by None | Military Governor of Cuba; 1899 | Succeeded by Leonard Wood |
