= 53rd Pennsylvania Infantry Regiment =

Union Army infantry regiment

53rd Pennsylvania Infantry
- Pennsylvania flag
- Active: August 1861 – June 30, 1865
- Country: United States
- Allegiance: Union
- Branch: Infantry
- Motto: We Might As Well Die Here
- Engagements: Yorktown, Fair Oaks, Gaines Mill, Peach Orchard, Savage Station, White Oak Swamp, Malvern Hill, Antietam, Fredericksburg, Chancellorsville, Gettysburg, Bristoe Station, Mine Run, Wilderness, Po River, Spotsylvania, North Anna, Totopotomoy, Cold Harbor, Petersburg, Strawberry Plains, Deep Bottom, Reams Station, Fort Stedman, Hatchers Run, Appomattox Court House

Commanders
- Notable commanders: John R. Brooke

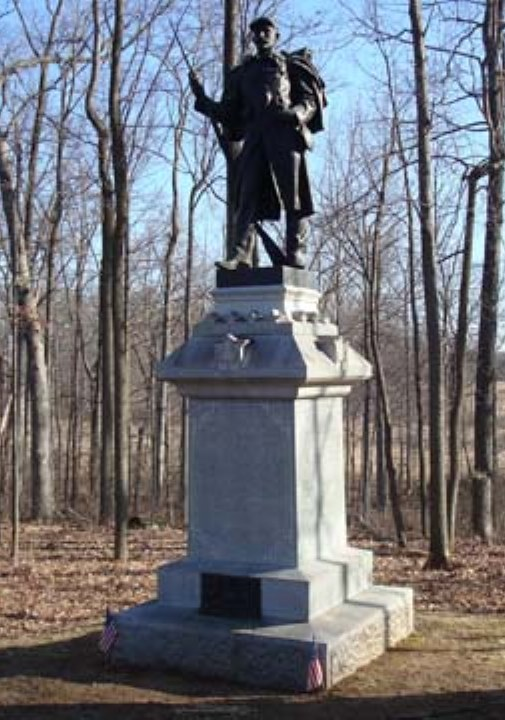
53rd Pennsylvania Infantry Monument, Brooke Avenue, Gettysburg Battlefield

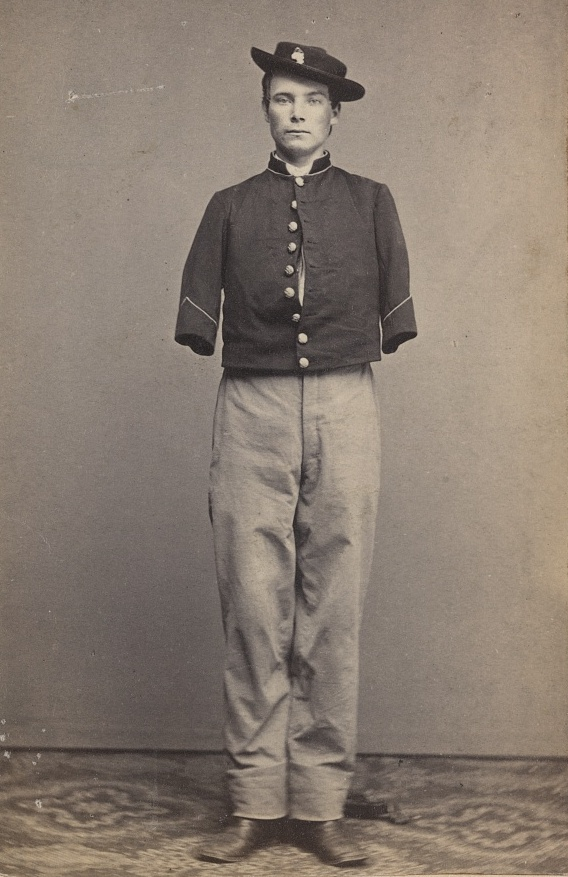
Pvt William Sergeant of Company E, 53rd Pennsylvania after the amputation of both arms, 1862

The 53rd Pennsylvania Volunteer Infantry was a volunteer infantry regiment in the Union Army during the American Civil War.

== History ==
=== Formation ===
The regiment was organized at Camp Curtin in Harrisburg, Pennsylvania, in the summer of 1861, with John R. Brooke, of Pottstown, Montgomery County, was commissioned colonel on August 21. Brooke had previously served as a captain in the three-month 4th Pennsylvania Infantry, and he immediately commenced recruiting his own regiment. By late September, the first companies had been organized and the first company was mustered into the service of the United States on September 28 at Camp Curtin.

Ten companies were eventually formed, raised in the following counties:

- Company A, Montgomery County
- Company B, Chester and Montgomery Counties
- Company C, Blair and Huntingdon Counties
- Company D, Centre and Clearfield Counties
- Company E, Carbon and Union Counties
- Company F, Luzerne County
- Company G, Potter County
- Company H, Northumberland County
- Company I, Juniata County
- Company K, Westmoreland County

Richard McMichael of Berks County was commissioned lieutenant colonel, Thomas Yeager of Lehigh County major, and Charles P. Hatch of Philadelphia was appointed adjutant. While at Harrisburg, the regiment performed provost guard duty in the city.

On November 7, the 53rd moved to Washington and encamped north of the Capitol before crossing the Potomac River on the 27th, and went into camp near Alexandria. Here, the regiment was assigned to the brigade of Brigadier General William H. French in General Edwin Sumner's division of the newly organized Army of the Potomac.

The regiment participated in the general advance of the army under Irwin McDowell toward Manassas Junction in March 1862, which had been evacuated by Confederate forces on the 12th. On March 21, Brooke's command supported General Oliver O. Howard's Philadelphia Brigade in its reconnaissance to Warrenton Junction and beyond to the Rappahannock River. The regiment remained near the junction until ordered to return to Manassas on March 23 and then back to Alexandria. Upon the re-organization of the army that spring, French's brigade was designated as the Third Brigade in the First Division, II Corps. General Sumner having moved up to corps command; the division was now commanded by General Israel B. Richardson.

=== First battles in Virginia ===
The II Corps was transferred with the army to the Peninsula to take part in Major General George McClellan's drive on Richmond. The first action the regiment took part in was during the Siege of Yorktown (1862),with the 53rd being held in reserve. The regiment briefly took part in the pursuit of the Confederate army before being ordered back to Yorktown on May 6. During the advance on Richmond which following the siege, the Fifty-third assisted engineers in constructing the famous "grapevine bridge" across the Chickahominy River, from May 28 to the 30th. The Fifty-third's first major battle was at the Battle of Fair Oaks on June 1, 1862. Sent into the middle of the battle, the regiment was temporarily disorganized, but was still able to drive back the Confederates. Ninety-six men killed, wounded, and missing during the battle, including Major Yeager, who was killed.

The 53rd fought during the Seven Days Battles, which began on June 27, when Confederate forces attacked the V Corps near Gaines' Mill. Richardson's division was rushed forward to the corps' assistance, crossing the Chickahominy and came under fire of Confederate artillery and infantry. Forming in line of battle, the division covered the Union withdrawal and at midnight re-crossed the Chickahominy. The regiment fought again at the Battle of Savage's Station on June 29 in order to protect Union supplies and wounded near the railroad station. After a short fight, the Confederates withdrew and the retreat was resumed at midnight, French's brigade acting as rearguard for the corps. At daylight the regiment reached White Oak Creek and rejoined the corps. The regiment was assisting in the destruction to a bridge when Confederate skirmishers appeared and opened fire on the Union troops. A number of Confederate batteries opened fire on the Union lines, though did little damage. Although not seriously engaged, the regiment lost several men wounded. The regiment withdrew with its brigade soon after midnight and marched to Malvern Hill, arriving on the morning of July 1. Though constantly under artillery fire throughout the Battle of Malvern Hill, no further losses were inflicted on the regiment.

The 53rd camped with the corps near Harrison's Landing on the James River until August 16. While here, the 64th New York was temporarily attached to the regiment for drill, discipline, and camp duty, all under command of Major Octavius S. Bull, promoted to fill the vacancy left by the death of Yeager. Brooke was placed in temporary command the brigade at this time, since General French who was ill. McMichael took a temporary leave due to sickness, one of over a hundred men of the regiment who suffered from illnesses during the campaign.

On August 16, the regiment marched to Newport News where it embarked for Alexandria, arriving on the 28th and camping next day near the Aqueduct Bridge. On the 30th, the brigade marched to Centreville, where it was deployed to protect the exposed flanks of the Union army in its retreat from Bull Run. It was near Vienna, Virginia, that the 53rd and one section of a battery were placed on the Leesburg Turnpike to guard the flank of the column. Suddenly, Confederate cavalry appeared and charged upon the Union column between the pike and Chain Bridge, separating the 53rd from the main column. Recognizing the danger, Colonel Brooke immediately rushed his regiment down the pike to rejoin the last of the column before their retreat was cut off. Soon after the battle, General French left the brigade to take command of the Third Division, II Corps, leaving Brooke in command of the brigade, a post he would hold off and on for the remainder of the war. Immediately thereafter, the Army of the Potomac moved towards western Maryland in response to the Confederate invasion. The Second Corps moved to Frederick, Maryland, and thence to South Mountain, where the regiment was held in reserve during the Battle of South Mountain on September 14. The next day it skirmished during the morning with Confederate cavalry near Boonsboro and Keedysville.

On September 17, the II Corps was moved to the Union right to support the Union I Corps during the Battle of Antietam. General Richardson formed his division in lines of battle on the Roulette Farm, with the Fifty-third placed on the extreme right of the division, to the west of the Miller cornfield. Not quite a half mile ahead of the division was a "sunken road" occupied by a North Carolina brigade and an Alabama brigade, with a second line placed behind a stone wall on a slight ridge that covered the road and open approaches. Initial charges on the road met with disaster, including the mortal wounding of General Richardson. Finally the order came for French's brigade to move up and charge the enemy position. The Fifty-third charged towards the sunken road, driving back a dense skirmish line and falling upon the collapsing Confederate center. Further penetration beyond the road could not be accomplished. The Fifty-third was ordered to the support of a battery in a nearby orchard, where they remained for the rest of the day under constant artillery fire. Twenty-eight men of the regiment were killed and wounded at this battle.

=== Fredericksburg to Gettysburg ===
On September 22, the regiment forded the Potomac River at Harper's Ferry and encamped on the following day on Bolivar Heights, where new shoes and clothing were given to the men to replace the clothing worn since the previous winter. On October 16, 1862, the regiment was sent on a reconnaissance to Charlestown, reaching the town before evening and capturing some prisoners before returning to Bolivar Heights. On October 30, the division crossed the Shenandoah River and proceeded down the Loudoun Valley, skirmishing with Confederate troops at Snicker's Gap on November 4. Here, Major General Ambrose Burnside assumed command of the Army of the Potomac and the movement upon Fredericksburg was begun. The Fifty-third marched to Falmouth where it arrived on November 19 and performed provost guard duty until December 11. It then took up a position opposite Fredericksburg in support of Union batteries engaged in the bombardment of the town.

Early the next morning, the regiment crossed the Rappahannock River and formed a skirmish line to drive rebel sharpshooters out of the city. One soldier was mortally wounded during the street fighting, before the 53rd was relieved and rested for the night on the river bank. Early on the morning of Saturday, December 13, the regiment marched through the fog into the streets of Fredericksburg and halted for an hour under Confederate artillery fire from Marye's Heights, west of the city where the Battle of Fredericksburg had begun. The brigade, commanded by Colonel Samuel K. Zook, rushed up St. Charles Street and formed in line of battle on the edge of town. The regiment reportedly got within 60 yards of the stone wall. Despite suffering heavy casualties and running low on ammunition, Brooke held his position, withdrawing back into the city after nightfall. The 53rd lost 39 killed and 119 wounded in the battle out of 283 officers and men.

The regiment wintered at Falmouth and did not to take part in the Mud March that January. Three companies under command of Major Bull were detailed as provost guard at division headquarters and the major assigned to the staff of General Couch. Bull remained at Second Corps headquarters successively with subsequent corps commanders until May 1864. After the appointment of Major General Joseph Hooker to army command, the 1st Division was divided into four brigades, with the Fourth commanded by Colonel Brooke and including the 53rd Pennsylvania, 27th Connecticut, 2nd Delaware, 145th Pennsylvania, and 64th New York.

On April 28, the Union Army began the Chancellorsville Campaign, crossing the Rappahannock River at United States Ford and moving into the Wilderness. The regiment was actively engaged on the skirmish line during the Battle of Chancellorsville, at one point in support of a battery near the Chancellor House with the 2nd Delaware and 145th Pennsylvania. One officer and several enlisted men were wounded by Confederate artillery fire, but the regiment stayed until ordered to withdraw. During the retreat, several men from the regiment manage to drag two guns from the battery three miles to the ford over the river. The Fifty-third remained on the battlefield until May 5 when, with the Irish Brigade, Brooke's brigade acted as a rear guard while the army withdrew. Losses for the regiment during the campaign were one officer and seven men wounded, with three missing and presumed captured.

The Second Corps returned to their old winter camps near Falmouth, where they remained until June 14 when the Fifty-third left camp and marched to Banks' Ford to observe Confederate movement westward. Having found that the Confederate columns had passed, the Fifty-third moved with the army northward, including a forced march to Thoroughfare Gap on June 20. Here the regiment remained on picket until the 25th when the enemy attacked, driving in the outposts and forcing the command to withdraw. Luckily the corps had passed through the gap hours earlier and the regiment soon rejoined its division as they crossed the Potomac River and marched to the vicinity of Frederick, Maryland. General Hooker was removed from command on June 28, and was replaced by Major General George G. Meade, who sent the army northward the next day to find Lee and draw him into battle. The Battle of Gettysburg started on July 1.

The Fifty-third marched from an overnight bivouac near Taneytown, Maryland, on July, arriving on the battlefield well after midnight. At eight o'clock on the morning of the 2nd, the division, commanded by General John C. Caldwell, moved to a position on Cemetery Ridge, forming the left wing of the Second Corps and connecting with the III Corps, which also formed along the ridge line. Around 5 P.M., Caldwell's Division was ordered to move south to support the First Division of the III Corps and shore up the battered line that ran through the Wheatfield. The division marched down a narrow farm lane to the north side of the field, where it was formed into battle lines and the brigades sent in one by one to stop the Confederates.

Brooke's Brigade was ordered to fill the gap in the division center and charged into the center of the wheat field where the men were met with a destructive fire of musketry, but still managed to drive back the Confederates. The brigade was able to hold back two waves of Confederates counterattacks, but with no support in sight and discovering enemy troops moving upon the rear of the brigade position, Brooke reluctantly ordered his men to retire to their first position. Re-entering the wheat field, the Union ranks were suddenly swept by Confederate fire from a fresh brigade newly arrived on the field. On July 3, the regiment was under a heavy artillery fire but not actively engaged. The regiment was reduced in numbers going into this battle with three companies being still on detached duty at division headquarters, and the remainder having only 124 officers and men. Six men were killed during the battle, sixty-seven wounded, one missing, and six captured. Colonel Brooke was also wounded in the retreat from the wheat field. Command of the regiment passed to Lt. Colonel McMichael.

On the afternoon of July 5, the regiment marched in pursuit of the retreating Confederates, arriving at Jones' Cross Roads near Confederate positions near Hagerstown, on July 11. The regiment advanced in line that evening after driving back enemy skirmishers to their main line, the regiment threw up breastworks. On the 14th it was deployed in line at right angles to the Williamsport Road and advanced cautiously only to discover the rebel works vacant, the southerners having crossed the Potomac River the evening before, back into Virginia. After remaining for a few days in Pleasant Valley, the Second Corps crossed the Potomac and marched down the Loudoun Valley to Ashby's and Manassas Gaps, passed White Plains, New Baltimore, and Warrenton and arrived on August 1 at Morrisville where it went into camp. During the Bristoe Campaign, the Fifty-third was engaged at the Battle of Bristoe Station. It also participated in the Mine Run Campaign. Ordered into winter quarters at Stevensburg, most of the regiment re-enlisted and on December 27, proceeded to Harrisburg for a veteran furlough, after which the regiment returned to Virginia and again camped near Stevensburg for the remainder of the winter.

=== Overland Campaign ===
In April 1864, the Second Corps was re-organized with the assimilation of the III Corps. The First Division, now commanded General Francis Barlow, reorganized its four brigades, the Fourth (Brooke's) joined by the 66th New York and 148th Pennsylvania. The corps' Second Division absorbed regiments as well, so that the Third Corps regiments became the Third and Fourth Divisions, respectively commanded by generals David Birney and Gershom Mott. Colonel Brooke also returned to the regiment and again assumed command of the brigade.

On May 4, 1864, the army crossed the Rapidan River at Ely's Ford to begin the Overland Campaign. The next day, the II corps moved toward Orange Court House where it was attacked in the Battle of the Wilderness. The Fifty-third was detached from the brigade to guard the corps' wagon train until that afternoon when it marched to rejoin the division, in line behind earthworks constructed along the length of the Brock Road. On May 6, the division moved out from its works and into the woods only to encounter an impassable swamp and concentrated enemy fire. The Fifty-third moved to the left approximately two miles and threw up breastworks before being recalled to the former position, where they were shifted again to the right to relieve the 19th Maine Infantry on the firing line. A massive Confederate charge by General James Longstreet's Corps was halted at the Union works, a portion of which went up in flames, but the line held. The Fifty-third rejoined the brigade just before nightfall but was quickly detached to report to the First Brigade for duty, where the men remained through another night. The 7th was spent in skirmishing and reinforcing the earthworks. The army moved southward, the Fifty-third marching at 6 A.M. on May 8 toward Spotsylvania Court House.

At 5 P.M. on May 9, Barlow's Division moved westward to the Po River and crossed where the advance was then blocked by a large Confederate force. Barlow attempted to shift his troops around the Confederates. McMichael was relieved of command due to illness, and Lt. Col. D. L. Stricker of the 2nd Delaware took command of both regiments that evening. The next day, the regiment was shifted around to various points along the line. After 1 P.M., the regiment was ordered forward in line of battle, through a ravine and up to the crest of a hill. After fighting for an hour, the 53rd was forced to fall back. Unable to turn the Confederate position, Barlow withdrew across the Po River that afternoon, the regiment going into camp a half mile from the river. On the 11th, Grant ordered an attack on the "Mule Shoe" salient. The Fifty-third took part behind the captured works until all of its ammunition was used up and it was ordered to the rear after noon. For the remainder of the battle, the regiment constructed earthworks and skirmished with the Confederates. During this time, Colonel Brooke was promoted to brigadier general and Major Bull promoted to lieutenant colonel to replace McMichael, who was discharged due to illness on May 19. Captain Henry S. Dimm was commissioned major on the 17th, but never formally mustered into the rank. (Dimm mustered out of service due to wounds received in September 1864 and was replaced by Captain William M. Mintzer, promoted to major.)

On May 20, the Second Corps marched southward from Spotsylvania, eventually reaching the North Anna River. Crossing on the 24th, the corps seized a ridge overlooking the river and southern lines, which was held until five o'clock when the Fifty-third moved forward three-quarters of a mile and built breastworks. Confederate artillery shelled the position, but the regiment suffered no casualties. The position was abandoned on the 27th, when the regiment recrossed the North Anna and moved across the Pamunkey River to Totopotomy Creek. By June 2, the corps had reached Cold Harbor, where it moved close up to the enemy's entrenched line and constructed breastworks that night. The regiment participated in the massive assault during the Battle of Cold Harbor the next day, suffering severe losses due to artillery and musket fire. Barlow's Division remained in their position, exchanging skirmish fire with the Confederates until the night of June 12.

=== Siege of Petersburg ===
The regiment crossed the Chickahominy River at Long Bridge, the James River on transports, and arrived on the morning of June 16 in front of Petersburg. The regiment formed line of battle on the left of the brigade, now commanded by Colonel Beaver of the 148th Pennsylvania, and moved forward with bayonets fixed. Rushing through a cornfield, the line was hit by Confederate artillery that staggered the formations. The line was ordered to halt and the men immediately began to dig earthworks using cups, plates, bayonets and their bare hands. At 6 P.M., the order came for another attack on the Confederate line. The regiment lost approximately seventy men in the charge on the southern fort. Moving to the southeast in an attempt to flank the Confederate line, on the 22nd, an attempt was made to establish a new line which proved alike unsuccessful. The Fifty-third had advanced through a dense wood and formed a battleline when the Confederates moved on their flank and rear. Fortunately, the regiment was able to return to the former line of works but several men became separated from the command and were captured. The regiment's losses from June 15 to the 30th totaled ten killed, 33 wounded, and 56 captured or missing.

Apart from a foray to Reams Station in mid-July, the regiment was busy with the building of entrenchments until July 26, when the Fifty-third moved with the brigade to the right and north of the James River, to take part in the First Battle of Deep Bottom. It returned to the Petersburg siege lines until August 12, when the command again returned to the left bank of the James where it was engaged with Confederate outposts at the Second Battle of Deep Bottom. On the 21st, the regiment re-crossed the James and the Appomattox Rivers and passing in rear of the army to the extreme left of the line, commenced demolishing the Weldon Railroad near Ream's Station. Five miles had already been destroyed when the Confederates attacked in force and a line of battle was hastily formed to repel his advance and protect the working parties. The first charge was repulsed, but the next charge struck with overpowering force and the line wavered. Exhaustion, illness and low morale all contributed to the near disaster for the Second Corps at the Second Battle of Ream's Station, forced to abandon the field and retire to the lines in front of Petersburg.

During the autumn and winter months the regiment was engaged in severe duty in the front lines before the besieged city. On September 18, Bull was promoted to colonel to replace McMichael, having been discharged. Mintzer was promoted to lieutenant colonel and became full colonel in November when Bull, exhausted and in poor health, mustered out of service. Captain Philip H. Shreyer was promoted to major, which he held when he, too, mustered out and was replaced by Captain George D. Pifer. Captain George C. Anderson was made lieutenant colonel.

=== Appomattox Campaign ===
On March 29, 1865, the V Corps had been ordered to move westward around the strained southern lines toward Five Forks, a major crossroads that protected the vital South Side Railroad into Petersburg. The II Corps was ordered to support and connect with the V in its operations. The First Division, now commanded by Nelson A. Miles, marched across Hatcher's Run to the Vaughn Road, where the brigade formed into a line of battle and advanced two miles, connecting with the V Corps. The advance continued the next morning, driving in Confederate skirmishers across Dabney's Mill Roadto the Boydton Plank Road before dark, where the men threw up breastworks and camped for the night. In the morning of March 31, the troops relieved the V Corps in their line of earthworks and watched them advance into the dense woods ahead. As the Battle of Dinwiddie Court House progressed, Miles ordered the Fourth Brigade to form a line in the rear to halt the retreat of the V Corps, which the men did as directed. At 12:30, Miles received orders to go to the relief of the V Corps, and ordered the Third and Fourth Brigades to do the job. They advanced across Licking Run and attacked the Confederates in their flank and rear, routing the Confederate battlelines and driving them to their earthworks above White Oak Road. Passing over the White Oak Road, Miles' troops encountered Confederate works and halted, not being strong enough to capture them. The line was shifted to make connection with the rest of the corps that evening. The Fifty-third lost fifteen men killed, one man mortally wounded, two officers and 47 men wounded in the fight on the Boydton Plank Road. Pifer led the Fifty-third in this action, Mintzer having been placed temporarily in command of a detachment deployed to pin down a portion of the Confederate force.

Returning to the Boydton Plank Road on the morning of April 1, the Fifty-third Pennsylvania stood picket duty until that afternoon when the division marched to the Battle of Five Forks, arriving after the battle had ended. A general withdrawal from Richmond and Petersburg was ordered that evening by General Lee. On April 2, the Fifty-third occupied abandoned Confederate works on the White Oak Road, and then marched in pursuit of the retreating force, confronting a dense line near Sutherland's Station. Miles sent forward two of his brigades, which could not break the southern line. Ramsey's Brigade was then sent on a flanking maneuver through a ravine and dense woods where it was massed and ordered forward at 2:45, attacking the Confederates in the flank, capturing the breastworks and routing the remainder of the Confederate force. Six hundred prisoners, one battleflag, and two artillery pieces were captured by the division in the Battle of Sutherland's Station, at a cost of eight men wounded in the Fifty-third.

The regiment participated in the pursuit of Lee's army toward Danville. On April 6, the division marched from Jetersville following a Confederate column guarding a wagon train, which became trapped at the Battle of Sayler's Creek. The bulk of the wagon train was taken along with several hundred prisoners, the Fifty-third arriving on the field at the close of the battle. The regiment moved out the following morning, crossed the South Side Railroad near High Bridge and over the Appomattox River where they immediately formed line of battle to confront a Confederate rear guard. One man was killed and another wounded in the ensuing Battle of Cumberland Church, which netted over one hundred prisoners, along with supplies and equipment scattered on the Buckingham Road toward Farmville where the Fifty-third bivouacked for the night. For the next two days the regiment marched unopposed until the 9th, when about four miles from Appomattox Court House, it was announced that the Army of Northern Virginia had surrendered. The column halted and camped on the Buckingham Road.

The Fifty-third Pennsylvania encamped for a short time near Burkeville, when the II Corps was ordered to Washington. On a forced march, the troops proceeded through Richmond, Fredericksburg, and to camps at Alexandria. On May 23, the regiment participated in the Grand Review. In June, the regiment marched to take a train home to Harrisburg, where they bivouacked at Camp Curtin. For the success attained in this service, Colonel Mintzer was promoted brevet brigadier general and several other officers received brevet-promotions. With final inventories made and pay drawn, the 53rd Pennsylvania Infantry was formally mustered out of service on June 30, 1865.

== Casualties ==
- Killed and mortally wounded: 5 officers, 195 enlisted men
- Died of disease: 1 officer, 193 enlisted men
- Total: 6 officers, 388 enlisted men

== Reenactments ==
Currently, a group in Montgomery County, Pennsylvania, represents Company A, while another group in Gettysburg, Pennsylvania, represents Company C.
