= Walter H. Cooke =

- Born: 21 July 1838; Norristown, Pennsylvania
- Died: 28 January 1909 (aged 70); Norristown, Pennsylvania
- Burial place: Saint Thomas Episcopal Church Cemetery
- Military career
- Allegiance: United States
- Branch: Union Army
- Service years: April–July 1861; September 1862; June–July 1863
- Rank: Captain
- Unit: 4th Regiment, Pennsylvania Volunteer Infantry
- Conflicts: American Civil War: First Battle of Bull Run
- Awards: Medal of Honor

Walter Howard Cooke (21 July 1838 – 28 January 1909) was a Union Army officer who fought in the American Civil War. Cooke received his country's highest award for bravery during combat, the Medal of Honor, for his actions at the First Battle of Bull Run in Virginia on 21 July 1861. He was honored with the award on 19 May 1887. He undertook several short periods of service in the Army before being discharged in 1863 and returning to civilian life. He then undertook a variety of business roles, including a directorship of a bank in Norristown and charity work. He died in 1909 at the age of 70.

== Early life and military service ==
Cooke was born in Norristown, Pennsylvania on 21 July 1838, the son of David and Mary Whipple née Cushman, Cooke. A descendant of the Mayflower settlers, he inherited substantial estates, residing at his family's mansion on Sydney Farm.

When the American Civil War began, Cooke organized Company K of the 4th Pennsylvania Infantry for three months' service with the Union Army in April 1861, in which he served as captain. The regiment's enlistment expired on the day before the First Battle of Bull Run began on 21 July and its men insisted on returning to Pennsylvania rather than staying to fight. Cooke, after finding that only a half dozen of his men stepped forward to fight in response to his appeal for them to stay, left them in disgust and initially started for the camp of the New York Fire Zouaves to serve as a private before being told he could be more useful with the staff of a unit. The regimental commander, Colonel John F. Hartranft, was the only other officer who stayed with the army from the 4th Pennsylvania. Cooke joined the staff of Colonel David Hunter's division as an aide-de-camp for the battle. After Hunter was wounded, he accompanied Colonel Ambrose Burnside and later replacement division commander Colonel Andrew Porter. Cooke was honorably mentioned after the battle and praised as "a young officer but...one of the bravest in the service." After the end of the war, he was awarded the Medal of Honor for his actions on 19 May 1887.

After being mustered out on 31 July, Cooke returned to Norristown. He served as major of the 11th Pennsylvania Militia Infantry in September 1862 when the militia was called up in response to the Maryland campaign. When the militia was called up in response to the Gettysburg campaign, Cooke became sergeant major of an independent cavalry company attached to the 20th Pennsylvania Cavalry Regiment on 29 June 1863, serving until 30 July, when the militiamen were discharged after the Confederate retreat from Pennsylvania.

== Later life ==
Cooke subsequently worked as director of the First National Bank in Norristown, and served on the local school board for three years. He participated in charity work with the Associated Charities, being one of the incorporators of the Norristown Charity Hospital and served as president of the association at the time of his death. He also served as a trustee of the Bringhurst Fund, which was established to provide affordable housing for the poor, and was a vestryman of St. John's Protestant Episcopal Church. Elected to the Military Order of the Loyal Legion of the United States in 1890, Cooke was also a member of the Art Club of Philadelphia. Cooke married Mary Newbold and had two daughters, Edith and Ellen, all of whom survived him.

He died suddenly at his home on 28 January 1909 and his remains are interred at the Saint Thomas Episcopal Church Cemetery in Pennsylvania.

== Medal of Honor citation ==
Voluntarily served as an aide on the staff of Col. David Hunter and participated in the battle, his term of service having expired on the previous day.

== See also ==
- List of American Civil War Medal of Honor recipients: A–F
