= William Sinclair (general) =

United States Army general (1835–1905)

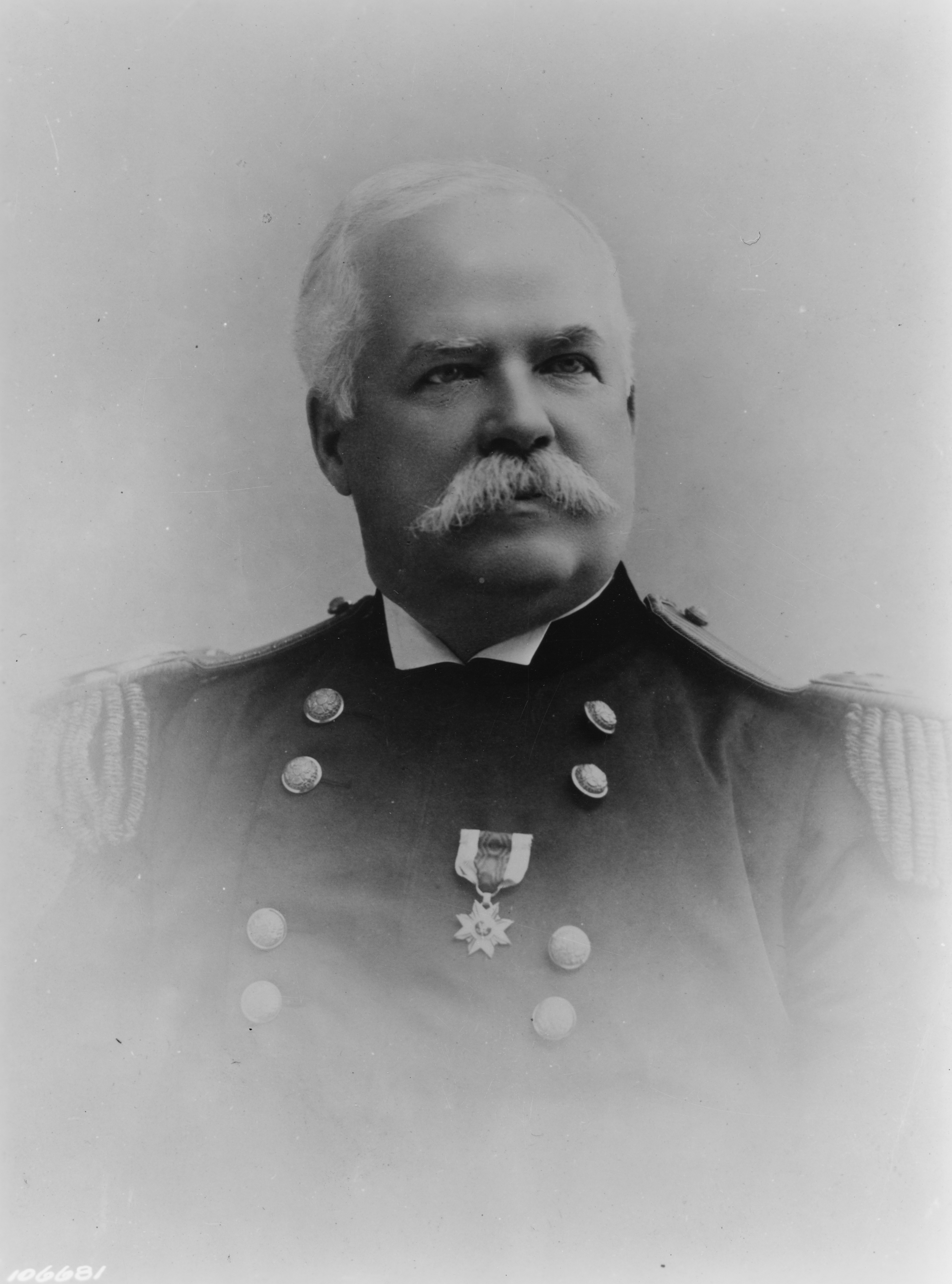
- Sinclair in 1899
- Born: February 15, 1835; Woodsfield, Ohio, US
- Died: October 3, 1905 (aged 70); Washington, D.C., US
- Burial place: Arlington National Cemetery
- Education: United States Military Academy
- Spouse: Eugenia "Daisy" McDonald (m. 1865–1905)
- Children: 1
- Military career
- Allegiance: United States; Union (American Civil War)
- Service: United States Army; Union Army
- Service years: 1857–1861 (U.S. Army); 1861–1865 (Union Army); 1865–1899 (U.S. Army)
- Rank: Brigadier General
- Unit: U.S. Army Field Artillery Branch
- Commands: 6th Pennsylvania Reserve Regiment; 1st Brigade, 3rd Division, Army of the Potomac; Battery C, 3rd Field Artillery Regiment; Fort Hamilton; Little Rock Barracks; Mount Vernon Barracks; Fort Warren; Fort Adams; Fort Alcatraz; Fort Wadsworth; 7th Regiment of Artillery; Fort Slocum
- Wars: American Civil War; American Indian Wars; Spanish–American War

William Sinclair (15 February 1835 – 3 October 1905) was a career officer in the United States Army. A Union Army veteran of the American Civil War, he served from 1857 to 1899 and retired as a brigadier general shortly before reaching the mandatory retirement age of 64. Sinclair was a veteran of the American Civil War, American Indian Wars, and Spanish–American War, and his commands included the: 6th Pennsylvania Reserve Regiment; 1st Brigade, 3rd Division, Army of the Potomac; Battery C, 3rd Field Artillery Regiment; Fort Warren, Massachusetts; Fort Alcatraz, California; the 7th Regiment of Artillery; and Fort Slocum, New York.

A native of Woodsfield, Ohio, Sinclair attended the United States Military Academy at West Point from 1853 to 1857. Commissioned as a second lieutenant of Field Artillery, his initial assignments included the federal government's response to John Brown's raid on Harpers Ferry in October 1859. During the American Civil War, Sinclair advanced to colonel of United States Volunteers, and he commanded first the 6th Pennsylvania Reserve Regiment, and later 1st Brigade, 3rd Division, Army of the Potomac. He was promoted to first lieutenant in April 1861, and received brevet promotions to captain in May 1862 to recognize his commendable service during the Siege of Yorktown, and major in December 1862 to recognize meritorious service at the Battle of Fredericksburg, during which he was wounded. He resigned his volunteer commission in June 1863, after which he served in Louisiana and Mississippi as assistant inspector general of the XIII Corps. Recommissioned in the volunteers, he served as a lieutenant colonel from October 1863 to July 1865. During the war, Sinclair was wounded three times.

After the war, Sinclair was promoted to captain in the regular army and served as West Point's quartermaster from September 1865 to September 1868, and in western Kansas during the American Indian Wars. Appointed to command Battery C, 3rd Field Artillery Regiment, Sinclair held this post for 17 years. In 1885, he was promoted to major in the 2nd Field Artillery Regiment, after which he commanded coast artillery posts including: Mount Vernon Barracks, Alabama; Fort Warren, Massachusetts; and Fort Adams, Rhode Island. He was promoted to lieutenant colonel of the 5th Regiment of Artillery in June 1896, his assignments included command of the posts at Fort Alcatraz, California and Fort Wadsworth, New York.

In March 1898, he was promoted to colonel and appointed during the Spanish–American War as commander of the 7th Regiment of Artillery and Fort Slocum, New York. Because he was near the mandatory retirement age of 64, Sinclair was unable to serve overseas during the Spanish–American War. On 8 February 1899, he received promotion to brigadier general. He retired on 13 February 1899, two days before turning 64. In retirement, Sinclair resided in Washington, D.C. He died in Washington on 3 October 1905 and was buried at Arlington National Cemetery.

== Early life ==
William Sinclair was born in Woodsfield, Ohio on 15 February 1835, a son of farmer and attorney John Sinclair and Mary (Adams) Sinclair. He was raised and educated in Woodsfield and worked on his father's farm. In 1853, he received an appointment to the United States Military Academy from Congressman William F. Hunter. He graduated in 1857 ranked 17th of 38. Among his classmates who later became prominent in the United States Army and Union Army were: George Crockett Strong, Henry Martyn Robert, Haldimand S. Putnam, Charles Hale Morgan, Marcus Reno, and Ira W. Claflin. Among his classmates who became notable while serving the Confederacy were Edward Porter Alexander, John S. Marmaduke, Samuel W. Ferguson, Manning M. Kimmel, and Robert H. Anderson.

After graduating, Sinclair was commissioned as a brevet second lieutenant of field artillery. After attending the Artillery School at Fort Monroe, he served on frontier duty at Fort Ripley, Minnesota from 1858 to 1859. In July 1858, he received his regular army commission as a second lieutenant in the 3rd Field Artillery Regiment. In October 1859, he took part in the U.S. government's military response to John Brown's raid on Harpers Ferry. He served at Fort Monroe from 1859 to 1860, Fort Columbus, New York in 1860, Vancouver Barracks, Washington Territory from 1860 to 1861, and Benicia Barracks, California in 1861. He received promotion to first lieutenant in April 1861.

== Early career ==
Sinclair served in the Union Army throughout the American Civil War. From November 1861 to March 1862 he took part in the Defenses of Washington. He served with the Army of the Potomac in the Virginia Peninsula campaign from March to August 1862, including the Siege of Yorktown from April to May 1862, and the Seven Days Battles from June to July 1862. He was promoted to brevet captain on 4 May 1862 to recognize his gallant and meritorious conduct at Yorktown.

In June 1862, Sinclair was promoted to colonel of United States Volunteers and appointed to command the 6th Pennsylvania Reserve Regiment. He took part in the Battle of Harrison's Landing on 2 July 1862, during which he acted as commander of 1st Brigade, 3rd Division. He commanded the regiment during the Northern Virginia campaign of August to September 1862. He was in command during the August 29 to 30 Second Battle of Bull Run, during which he was wounded. Sinclair commanded the 6th Pennsylvania in the Maryland campaign from September to November 1862, including the Battle of South Mountain (14 September 1862) and the Battle of Antietam (17 September 1862). He led his command on the October to November 1862 march to Falmouth, Virginia and took part as brigade commander in the 11 to 15 December 1862 Battle of Fredericksburg, during which he was severely wounded. He was on convalescent leave from 13 December 1862 to 15 March 1863. Sinclair was promoted to brevet major on 13 December 1862 to commend his performance of duty at Fredericksburg. He commanded the 1st Brigade in the Defenses of Washington from March to May 1863 and resigned his temporary colonel's commission in June 1863.

Sinclair commanded a battery of the 3rd Artillery during the Vicksburg campaign of July 1863 and was present for the Siege of Vicksburg and the Confederate surrender on 4 July. He took part in the subsequent Jackson expedition, including the capture of the city on 16 July. From July to October 1863, Sinclair served as acting assistant inspector general of XIII Corps. In October, he was promoted to lieutenant colonel of volunteers. He served on the Texas coast in November and December 1863, in New Orleans from January to March 1864, and on the Red River campaign in Louisiana from March to May 1864. He took part in the Actions near Alexandria and a skirmish near Marksville. He served again in New Orleans from May to June 1864, and was on duty with the office of the army inspector general in Washington from July 1864 to August 1865, including detached duty in Virginia, Arkansas, Indian Territory, and Nashville, Tennessee.

== Continued career ==
Sinclair returned to his permanent rank of first lieutenant in July 1865. From September 1865 to September 1868, he served as quartermaster of the United States Military Academy, and he was promoted to captain in the regular army in December 1865. On 11 December 1865, he married Eugenia "Daisy" McDonald. They were married until his death and were the parents of a daughter, Belle.

After his service as West Point's quartermaster, Sinclair was appointed to command Battery C, 3rd Field Artillery Regiment, which he led for the next 17 years. He was assigned to Omaha Barracks, Nebraska from November 1868 to March 1869. He served at Fort Leavenworth, Kansas from March to April 1869, and Fort Riley, Kansas from April 1869 to April 25, 1871. From June to September 1870, he took part in expeditions against American Indians in western Kansas. He was posted to Charleston, South Carolina from May 1871 to November 1872, and Fort Hamilton, New York from November 1872 to December 1881; during part of his tour at Fort Hamilton, he served as the post commander. During the Great Railroad Strike of 1877, Sinclair was assigned to peace keeping duties in Pennsylvania from July to October. From December 1881 to June 1885, he commanded the post at Little Rock Barracks, Arkansas, and in April 1885 he was promoted to major in the 2nd Regiment of Artillery.

== Later career ==
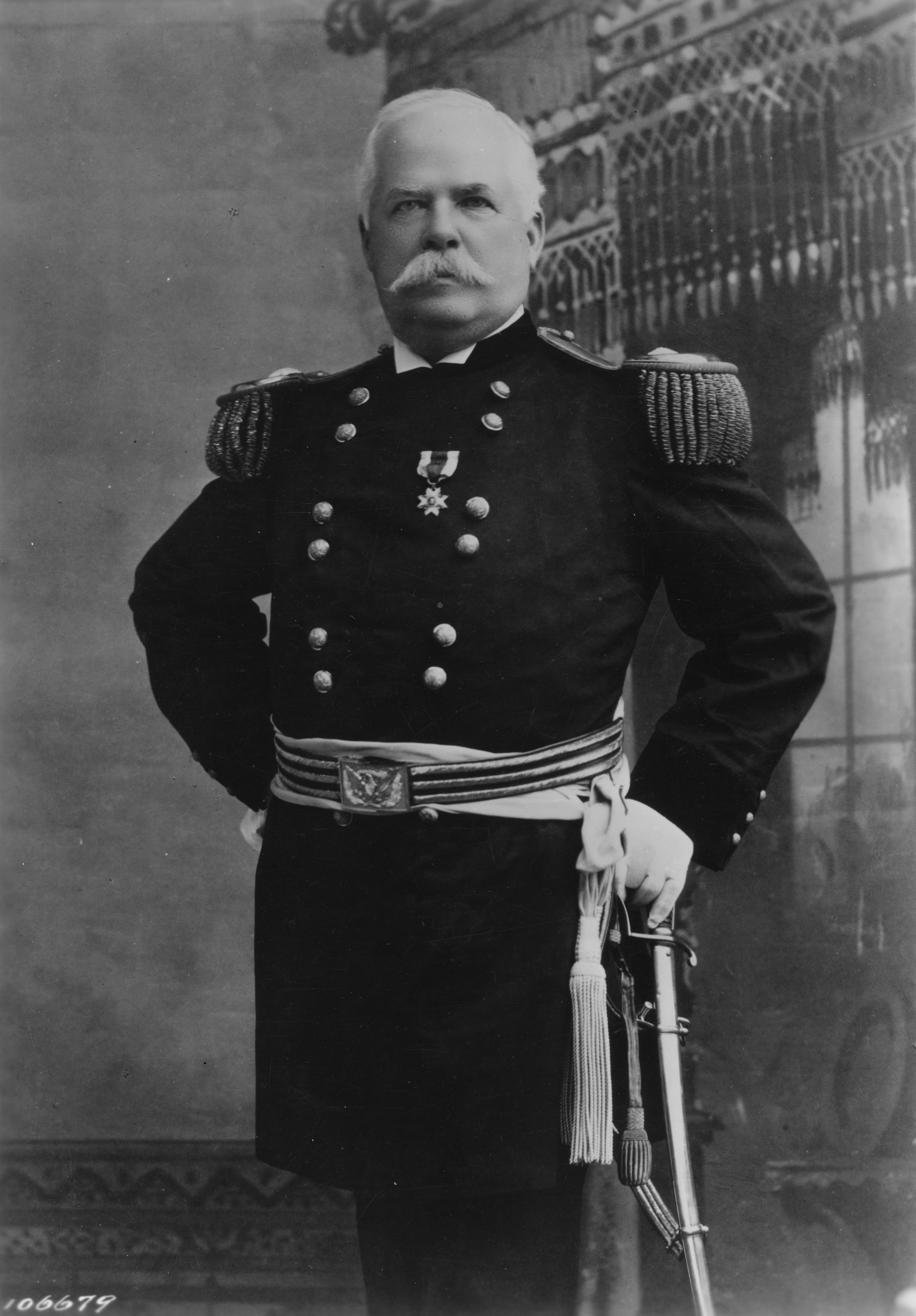
Standing portrait of Sinclair c. 1899

Sinclair commanded Mount Vernon Barracks, Alabama from June 1885 to May 1889. From May 1889 to September 1895, he commanded the coast artillery post at Fort Warren, Massachusetts. Sinclair was commander of the post at Fort Adams, Rhode Island from September 1895 to June 1896. He was promoted to lieutenant colonel of the 5th Regiment of Artillery on 6 June 1896. From July to October 1896, Sinclair commanded the post at Fort Alcatraz, California. He was then assigned to command the post at Fort Wadsworth, New York, where he served from October 1896 to March 1898. He was promoted to colonel in March 1898 and assigned to command the 7th Regiment of Artillery and the post at Fort Slocum, New York.

In addition to its function as a coast artillery post, during the Spanish–American War Fort Slocum was used as a recruit depot and a staging ground for troops going overseas. It was garrisoned by several companies of the 22nd New York Volunteer Infantry, which Sinclair commanded as the post's senior officer. Because he was near the mandatory retirement age of 64, Sinclair was unable to serve in Cuba, and he remained at Fort Slocum until January 1899, when he went on leave pending his retirement the following month. On 8 February 1899, Sinclair was promoted to brigadier general. He retired on 13 February 1899, two days before reaching his 64th birthday.

In retirement, Sinclair was a resident of Washington, D.C. He was a member of the Military Order of the Loyal Legion of the United States. He died in Washington on 3 October 1905. Sinclair was buried at Arlington National Cemetery.
