= Joseph K. Corson =

American military officer (1836–1913)

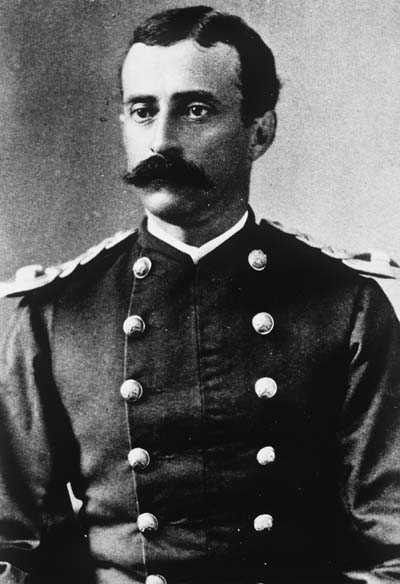
- Born: 22 November 1836; Whitemarsh Township, Pennsylvania, U.S.
- Died: 24 July 1913 (aged 76); Plymouth Meeting, Pennsylvania, U.S.
- Burial place: West Laurel Hill Cemetery, Bala Cynwyd, Pennsylvania, U.S.
- Military career
- Allegiance: United States of America
- Branch: Union army United States Army
- Service years: 1861, 1863-1865, 1867-1897
- Rank: Major
- Units: 4th Pennsylvania Infantry Regiment; 6th Pennsylvania Reserve Regiment
- Conflicts: American Civil War; Battle of Gettysburg; Battle of Williamsport; Battle of Manassas Gap; Battle of Bristoe Station; Battle of Mine Run; Battle of Rappahannock Station; Battle of the Wilderness; Battle of Spotsylvania Court House; Battle of North Anna; Battle of Bethesda Church
- Awards: Medal of Honor

Joseph Kirby Corson (22 November 1836 – 24 July 1913) was an American military officer who served in the Union army as an assistant surgeon during the American Civil War. He received the country's highest award for bravery during combat, the Medal of Honor, for his actions during the Battle of Bristoe Station on 14 October 1863. He was honored with the award on 13 May 1899.

== Early life and education ==
Corson was born in Whitemarsh Township, Pennsylvania, on 22 November 1836, the second of nine children of Hiram and Ann Jones Foulke Corson. His father was a doctor and provided a tutor for Corson's education before he entered Treemount Seminary in nearby Norristown. He moved to Philadelphia in 1856 and worked as an apprentice at a drugstore. He attended the Philadelphia College of Pharmacy and graduated with a PhG in 1858. Corson moved to St. Paul, Minnesota, to work with a pharmacist, but the business failed and Corson returned to Norristown to partner in a cousin's lime business. He enrolled at the medical school of the University of Pennsylvania.

== American Civil War ==
Corson left school at the beginning of the American Civil War when President Abraham Lincoln requested 90-day volunteers. He enlisted in Company K of the 4th Pennsylvania Infantry as a corporal and served from April 20, 1861, to July 26, 1861. He was discharged at the rank of sergeant and re-entered the University of Pennsylvania medical school and served as a medical cadet at the army hospital on Cherry and Broad Streets from January 1862 to March 1863.

After graduation from medical school in March 1863, he enlisted in the 6th Pennsylvania Reserves (35th Pennsylvania Volunteers) as an assistant surgeon. He participated in the Battles of Gettysburg, Falling Waters, Manassas Gap, Bristoe Station, Mine Run, Rappahannock Station, the Wilderness, Spotsylvania, North Anna, and Bethesda Church.

He was brevetted major for distinguishing himself during the Battle of the Wilderness. At Bristoe Station on 14 October, Corson and a hospital attendant rescued a severely wounded soldier left between the lines while under Confederate artillery fire. For this action, he was awarded the Medal of Honor on 13 May 1899. In November 1864, he became medical officer at Camp Discharge, used to muster out soldiers, in Philadelphia.

== Post war career ==
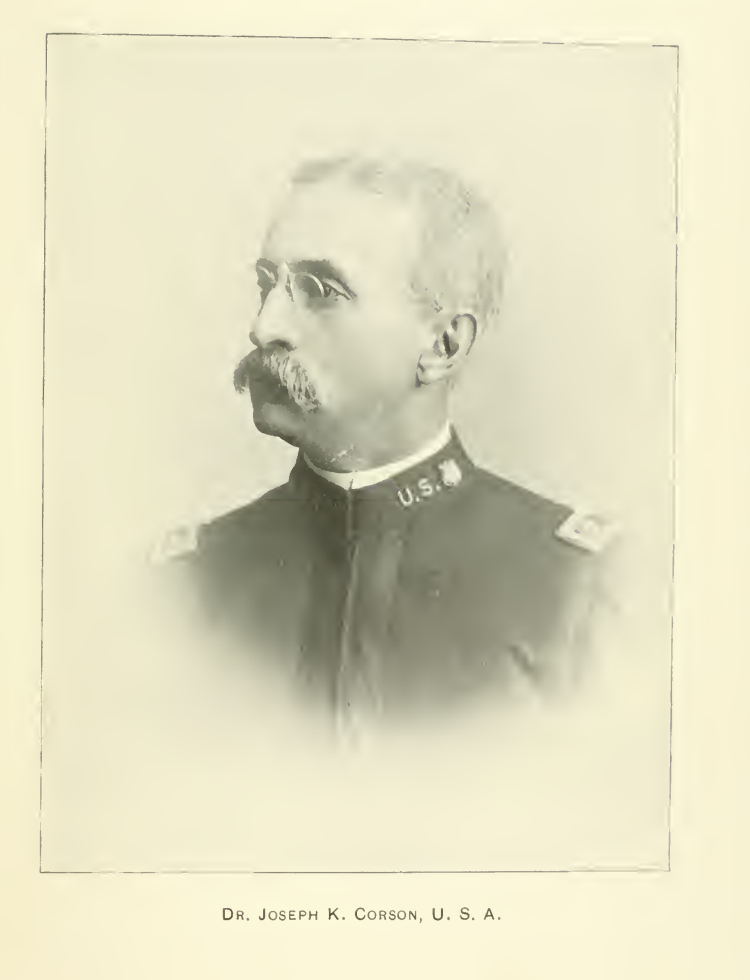
Joseph K. Corson in 1909

After the end of the war, Corson mustered out in May 1865 and returned to Plymouth Meeting to join his father's practice. He joined the United States Army as assistant surgeon on October 9, 1867, at the rank of first lieutenant. He was stationed at Army bases in Alabama, Arizona, California, Idaho, Louisiana, Missouri, Nebraska, New York, Texas, and Wyoming. He served as assistant surgeon on the survey of the Sierra Nevada mountain range led by Clarence King. Corson Peak in Utah was named in his honor.

A Yavapai quiver he collected during his service in the Western United States was purchased by George Gustav Heye and is part of the collection at the National Museum of the American Indian. While stationed in Wyoming, he became interested in fossil hunting and discovered fossils of Eocene mammals that were given to Professor Joseph Leidy at the University of Pennsylvania.

He was promoted to major on November 14, 1888, and retired in November 1897.

He was a member of the Pennsylvania Commandery Military Order of the Loyal Legion of the United States.

He died on 24 July 1913, at his home in Plymouth Meeting, Pennsylvania, from heart disease. He was interred at West Laurel Hill Cemetery, Bryn Mawr section, Lot 98, in Bala Cynwyd, Pennsylvania.

== Medal of Honor citation ==
With one companion returned in the face of the enemy's heavy artillery fire and removed to a place of safety a severely wounded soldier who had been left behind as the regiment fell back.

== Personal life ==
While stationed at Fort Bridger, he married Mary Ada Carter in 1874 and together they had two children.

== See also ==
- List of American Civil War Medal of Honor recipients: A–F
