= 6th Pennsylvania Reserve Regiment =

Union Army infantry regiment

6th Pennsylvania Reserve Regiment (35th Pennsylvania Volunteer Infantry)
- Active: April 22, 1861 – June 11, 1864
- Country: United States
- Allegiance: Union
- Branch: Infantry
- Engagements: Battle of Dranesville; Seven Days Battles; Second Battle of Bull Run; Battle of South Mountain; Battle of Antietam; Battle of Fredericksburg; Battle of Gettysburg; Bristoe Campaign; Mine Run Campaign; Battle of the Wilderness; Battle of Spotsylvania Court House; Battle of North Anna; Battle of Totopotomoy Creek; Battle of Cold Harbor

The 6th Pennsylvania Reserve Regiment also known as the 35th Pennsylvania Volunteer Infantry was an infantry regiment that served in the Union Army as part of the Pennsylvania Reserves Infantry Division during the American Civil War.

== Organization ==
Company	Moniker	Primary Location of Recruitment	Captains
A	The Iron Guards	Columbia County	Willington H. Ent
B	The Union Guards	Snyder County	Chas. D. Roush
C	The Honesdale Guards	Wayne County	Jno. S. Wright
D	The Washington Rifles	Franklin County	William D. Dixon
E	The Montour Rifles	Montour County	M.H. Manly
F	The Northern Invincibles	Bradford County	Daniel Bradbury
G	The J.D. Cameron Infantry	Dauphin County	Jacob Rehrer
H	The Tioga Invincibles	Tioga County	Julius Sherwood
I	The Towanda Rifles	Bradford County	W.H.H. Gore
K	The Susquehanna Volunteers	Susquehanna County	John Shull

== Service ==
The 6th Pennsylvania Reserves was organized in Harrisburg, Pennsylvania, and mustered in July 27, 1861 under the command of Colonel W. Wallace Ricketts.

The regiment was attached to 3rd Brigade, McCall's Pennsylvania Reserves Division, Army of the Potomac, to March 1862. 3rd Brigade, 2nd Division, I Corps, Army of the Potomac, to April 1862. 3rd Brigade, McCall's Division, Department of the Rappahannock, to June 1862. 3rd Brigade, 3rd Division, V Corps, Army of the Potomac, to July 1862. 1st Brigade, 3rd Division, V Corps, to August 1862. 1st Brigade, 3rd Division, III Corps, Army of Virginia, to September 1862. 1st Brigade, 3rd Division, I Corps, Army of the Potomac, to February 1863. 1st Brigade, Pennsylvania Reserve Division, XXII Corps, Department of Washington, to June 1863. 1st Brigade, 3rd Division, V Corps, Army of the Potomac, to June 1864.

The 6th Pennsylvania Reserves mustered out June 11, 1864.

== Detailed service ==
At Camp Biddle, Greencastle, Pa., July 12–22, 1861. Moved to Washington, D.C., July 22. Duty at Tennallytown, Md., July 27 to October 10, 1861, and at Camp Pierpont, near Langley, Va., until March 1862. Expedition to Grinnell's Farm December 6, 1861. Action at Dranesville December 20. Advance on Manassas, Va., March 10–15. 1862. McDowell's advance on Falmouth, Va., April 9–19. Duty at Fredericksburg, Va., until June. Moved to White House June 11–13. Seven Days before Richmond June 25 – July 1. Guarding supplies at Tunstall's Station and White House June 26 – July 2. At Harrison's Landing until August 16. Movement to join Pope August 16–26. Battle of Gainesville August 28. Battle of Groveton August 29. Second Battle of Bull Run August 30. Maryland Campaign September 6–24. Battle of South Mountain September 14. Battle of Antietam September 16–17. Near Sharpsburg until September 26. Movement to Falmouth, Va., September 26 – November 19. Battle of Fredericksburg December 12–15. "Mud March" January 20–24, 1863. Ordered to Washington, D.C., February 6, and duty there and at Alexandria until June 25, 1863. Rejoined the Army of the Potomac in the field. Battle of Gettysburg July 1–3. Pursuit of Lee July 5–24. Bristoe Campaign October 9–22. Advance to line of the Rappahannock November 7–8. Rappahannock Station November 7. Mine Run Campaign November 26 – December 2. Bristoe Station February 1, 1864. Rapidan Campaign May. Battle of the Wilderness May 5–7, Battle of Laurel Hill May 8, Battle of Spotsylvania May 8–12, and Battle of Spotsylvania Court House May 12–21. Assault on the Salient May 12. Harris Farm May 19. North Anna River May 23–26. Jericho Ford May 25. Line of the Pamunkey May 26–28. Totopotomoy May 28–31.

== Casualties ==
The regiment lost a total of 183 men during service; 3 officers and 107 enlisted men killed or mortally wounded, 73 enlisted men died of disease.

== Commanders ==
- Colonel W. Wallace Ricketts – discharged due to disability February 27, 1862
- Colonel William Sinclair – resigned May 23, 1863
- Colonel Wellington H. Ent

== Notable members ==
- Assistant Surgeon Joseph K. Corson – Medal of Honor recipient for action at the Battle of Bristoe Station
- Corporal Chester S. Furman, Company A – Medal of Honor recipient for action at the Battle of Gettysburg
- Sergeant John W. Hart, Company D – Medal of Honor recipient for action at the Battle of Gettysburg
- Sergeant Wallace W. Johnson, Company G – Medal of Honor recipient for action at the Battle of Gettysburg
- Sergeant George W. Mears, Company A – Medal of Honor recipient for action at the Battle of Gettysburg
- Corporal James Levi Roush, Company D – Medal of Honor recipient for action at the Battle of Gettysburg
- Corporal Thaddeus S. Smith, Company E – Medal of Honor recipient for action at the Battle of Gettysburg

== See also ==
- List of Pennsylvania Civil War Units
- Pennsylvania in the Civil War
