= Chester S. Furman =

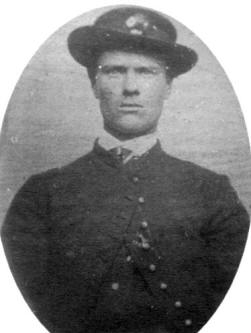
- Born: February 14, 1842; Edgar County, Illinois, United States
- Died: July 22, 1910 (aged 68)
- Burial place: Columbia, Pennsylvania, United States
- Military career
- Allegiance: United States of America
- Branch: United States Army; Union Army
- Rank: Corporal
- Units: Company A, 6th Pennsylvania Reserves (United States) US Army Signal Corps
- Conflicts: Battle of Gettysburg
- Awards: Medal of Honor

Chester S. Furman (February 14, 1842 – July 22, 1910) was an American soldier who received the Medal of Honor for valor during the American Civil War.

== Biography ==
Furman joined the 6th Pennsylvania Reserves in July 1861 and was transferred to the US Army Signal Corps in October 1863. He received the Medal of Honor on August 3, 1897 for his actions on the second day of the Battle of Gettysburg.

== Medal of Honor citation ==
Citation:

The President of the United States of America, in the name of Congress, takes pleasure in presenting the Medal of Honor to Corporal Chester S. Furman, United States Army, for extraordinary heroism on 2 July 1863, while serving with Company A, 6th Pennsylvania Reserves, in action at Gettysburg, Pennsylvania. Corporal Furman was one of six volunteers who charged upon a log house near Devil's Den, where a squad of the enemy's sharpshooters were sheltered, and compelled their surrender.

== See also ==
- List of Medal of Honor recipients for the Battle of Gettysburg
- List of American Civil War Medal of Honor recipients: A–F
